= Berlin station (Connecticut) =

Train station in Berlin, Connecticut, US

Berlin
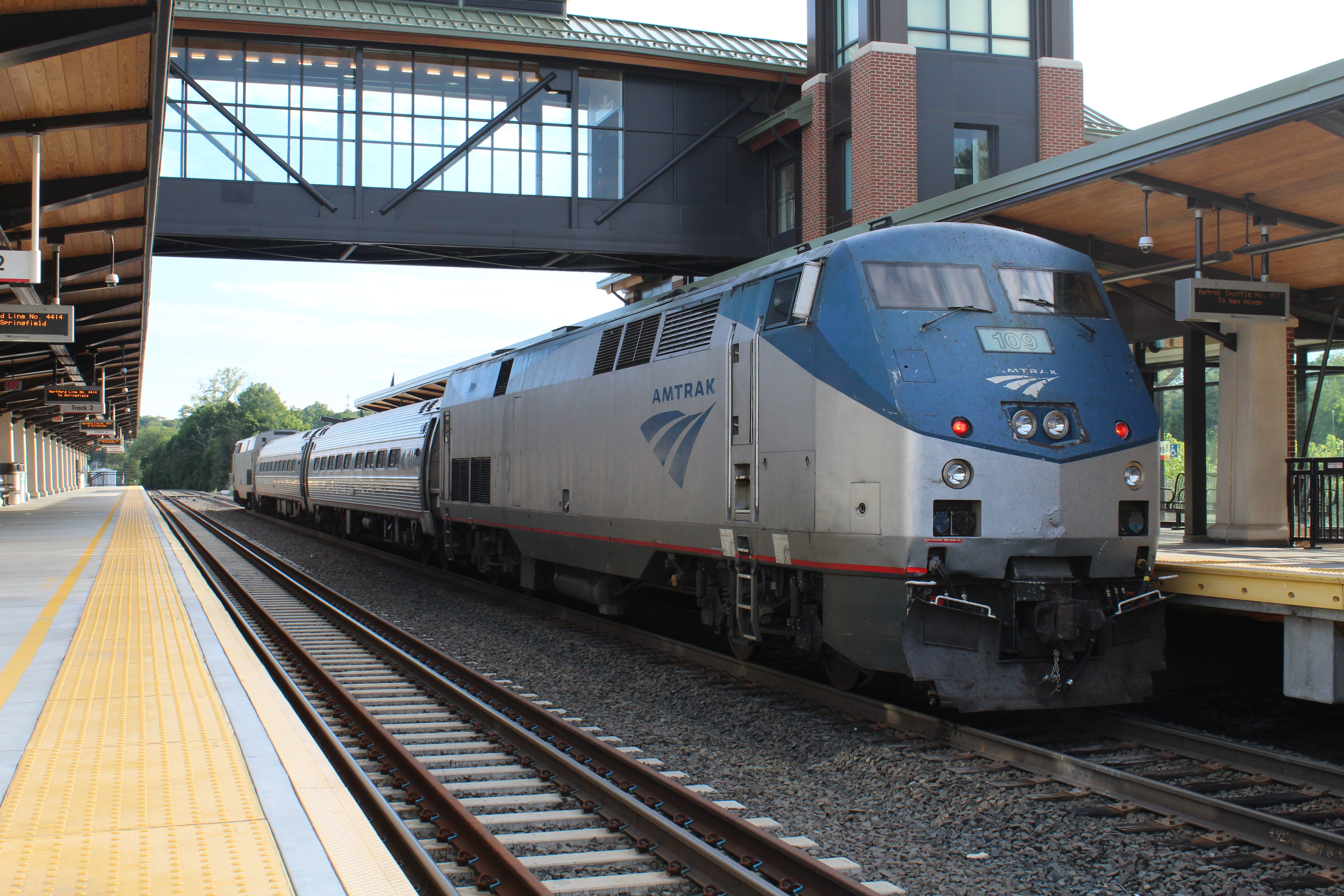
- A southbound Amtrak Shuttle at Berlin station in July 2019

General information
- Location: 51 Depot Road; Berlin, Connecticut; United States
- Coordinates: 41.6356°N 72.7653°W
- Owner: ConnDOT
- Line: New Haven–Springfield Line
- Platforms: 2 side platforms
- Tracks: 2
- Connections: CTtransit New Britain: 511, 512, 513

Construction
- Parking: 235
- Cycle facilities: Racks
- Accessible: Yes
- Architect: Michael Baker International

Other information
- Station code: Amtrak: BER

History
- Opened: December 1839
- Rebuilt: 1848, 1893, 1896, 1900; 2014–2018 (current station)

Passengers
- FY 2025: 34,926 (Amtrak)

Services
Preceding station	Amtrak	Following station
Meriden toward Norfolk, Newport News or Roanoke	Northeast Regional	Hartford toward Springfield
Meriden toward New Haven	Hartford Line	Hartford toward Springfield
Meriden toward New Haven	Valley Flyer	Hartford toward Greenfield
Vermonter does not stop here
Preceding station	CT Rail	Following station
Meriden toward New Haven Union Station	Hartford Line	Hartford toward Springfield
Former services
Preceding station	Amtrak	Following station
Meriden toward Washington, D.C.	Montrealer 1972–1981	Hartford toward Montreal
Meriden toward Atlantic City	Atlantic City Express 1991–1995	Hartford toward Springfield
Meriden toward Washington, D.C.	Vermonter 1995–2018	Hartford toward St. Albans
Location

Berlin station is a train station located in the Kensington neighborhood of Berlin, Connecticut. It is on the New Haven–Springfield Line and is served by Amtrak's Northeast Regional, Hartford Line, and Valley Flyer, in addition to the Hartford Line commuter rail. Two high-level platforms, each six cars long connected by an overhead pedestrian bridge opened at the Hartford Line service launch on June 16, 2018. On December 21, 2016, the historic 1900-built station building was destroyed by a fire.

== History ==
=== Early stations and branches ===
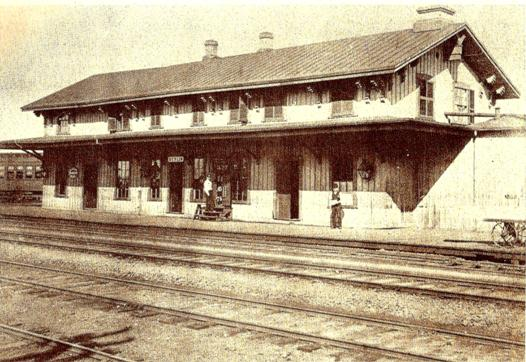
The 1848-built station at an unknown date

The Hartford and New Haven Railroad (H&NH) opened from New Haven to Meriden in December 1838, and to Hartford in December 1839. The first ticket office was located about 0.5 miles (0.80 km) south of the modern location, possibly in a general store. It was replaced by a wooden station at the modern site in 1848, after the original first depot was vacated and sold to Daniel C. Spencer sometime between 1840 and 1855, which he used a steam wheel shop until March 1, 1871. Spencer sold the property the "steam wheel shop" was on to William Daniels who stated in the deed that "said shop is to be removed from the premises at the convenience of the grantor".

Middletown residents, unhappy at the H&NH skipping their town, constructed the Middletown Railroad to Berlin in 1849; it was taken over by the H&NH in 1850. It connected with the mainline at a wye, with the station inside the wye. The New Britain and Middletown Railroad as built from Berlin to New Britain in 1865; the H&NH operated it from the beginning and purchased it in 1868. In 1870, all three lines connecting at Berlin became part of the New York, New Haven and Hartford Railroad.

=== Brick stations ===
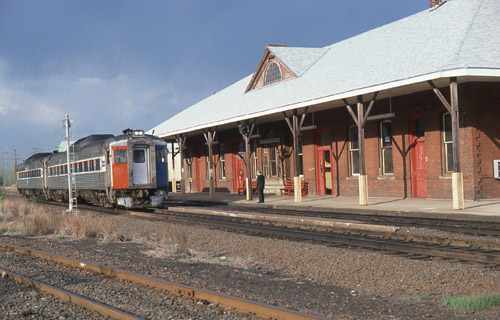
An Amtrak train at Berlin station in 1980

The New Haven replaced the 1848 station with a standard yellow brick design, similar to those extant at South Norwalk and Torrington, opening around August 24, 1893 on the east side of the mainline tracks. The two branch lines were extended on a diamond crossing across the mainline around this time. The 1893-built station burned in 1896 and was replaced by a nearly identical building in red brick, which in turn burned on June 27, 1900. The walls and foundation of the later station were largely intact and used to build a new station, which opened in December 1900.

On May 27, 1897, third rail electric service began from Hartford and Berlin to New Britain. Electrification was extended to Bristol in 1898, but withdrawn on July 7, 1906, when the City of New Britain obtained a court order against the electrification, which had caused a number of deaths. However, trolley service powered by overhead wires successfully operated over the Middletown branch from 1906 to the 1920s.

In the 1920s, a southbound station building (possibly a freight house) was constructed on the west side of the tracks. Passenger service ended on the Middletown branch around 1932, and on the branch to New Britain around 1935. The southbound building burned in the 1970s. Amtrak took over intercity service on the mainline on May 1, 1971.

With passenger service at low levels for the last part of the century, the station fell into disrepair. The roof and gutters built into the walls leaked, causing freeze-thaw damage to the brick structure. Many of the original electrical, plumbing, and heating systems were also in ill repair. Despite this, the station was among the best-preserved 19th-century stations in the state, with much of its original interior still intact. The town received $2.12 million in state and federal grants in 2005 to fund restoration. Engineering assessment of the station began in 2008, with final design completed in 2012.

=== New station ===
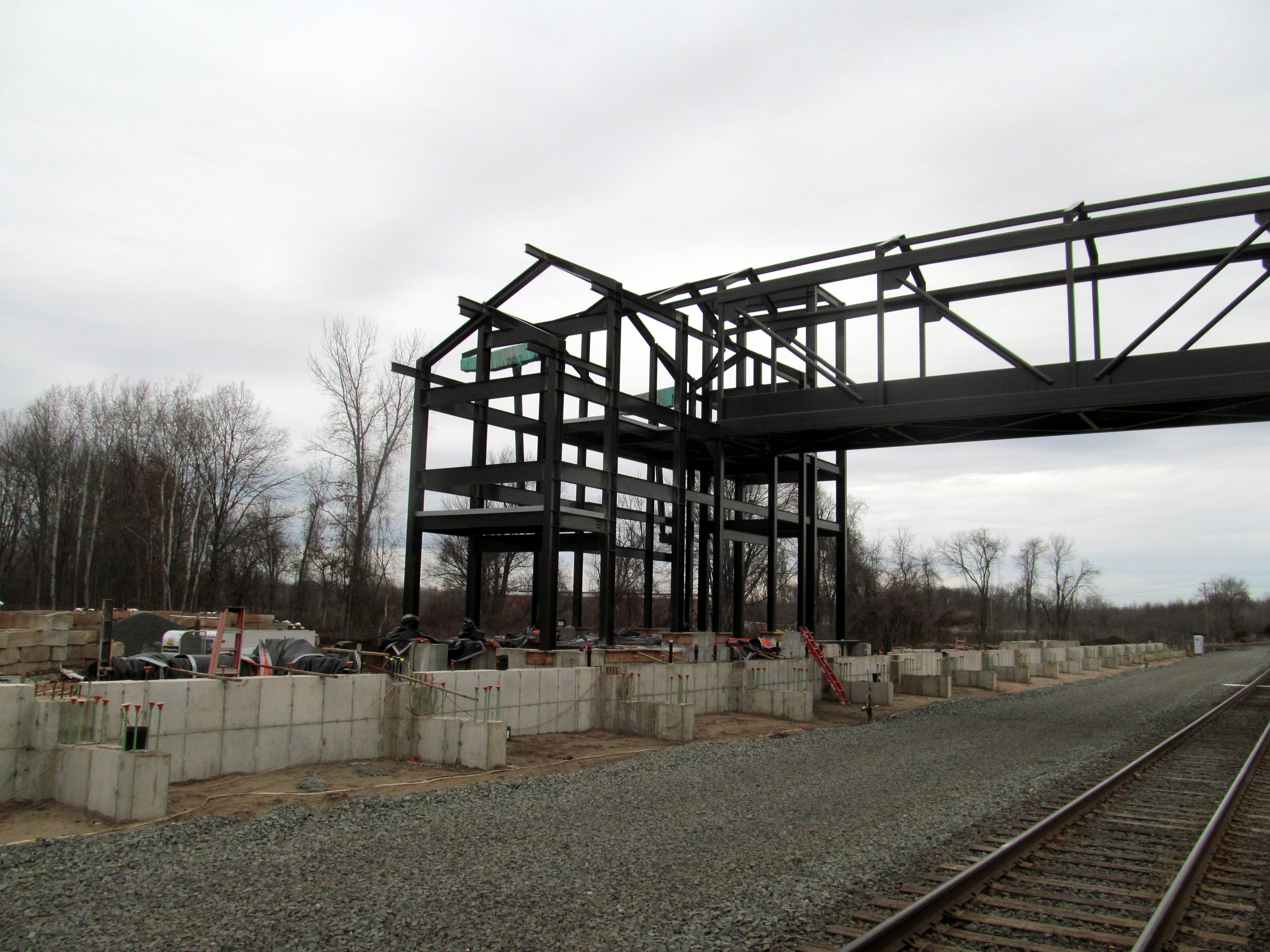
Southbound platform and pedestrian bridge under construction in December 2015

Construction on the new station started in 2014. The historic station building, including the ticket office, closed on March 4, 2016, for renovations. On April 25, 2016, a temporary platform was opened south of the station building so that the northbound high-level platform could be constructed on the site of the former low-level platform.

On December 21, 2016, the 1900-built station building was destroyed by an early-morning fire. The under-construction platforms and bridge were not significantly harmed, but Amtrak briefly stopped service to the station before resuming with a speed restriction. On December 29, state investigators ruled that the station remains were too damaged to repair. Instead, historically significant items like radiators and stone lintels were salvaged and the station remains demolished. The demolition was delayed due to insurance concerns in January 2017.

The rebuilt Berlin station partially opened on June 16, 2018, the same day the Hartford Line commuter rail commenced service, following Meriden and Wallingford in late 2017. Amenities at the new station include two high-level platforms connected by a pedestrian bridge, automatic snow melt systems, and train information displays. The Vermonter stops at Berlin and Wallingford stations were discontinued on June 9, 2018, due to the addition of Hartford Line service. A ribbon-cutting ceremony was held for the completed station on October 23, 2018.
