= New Haven Yard =

Railroad yard in New Haven, Connecticut

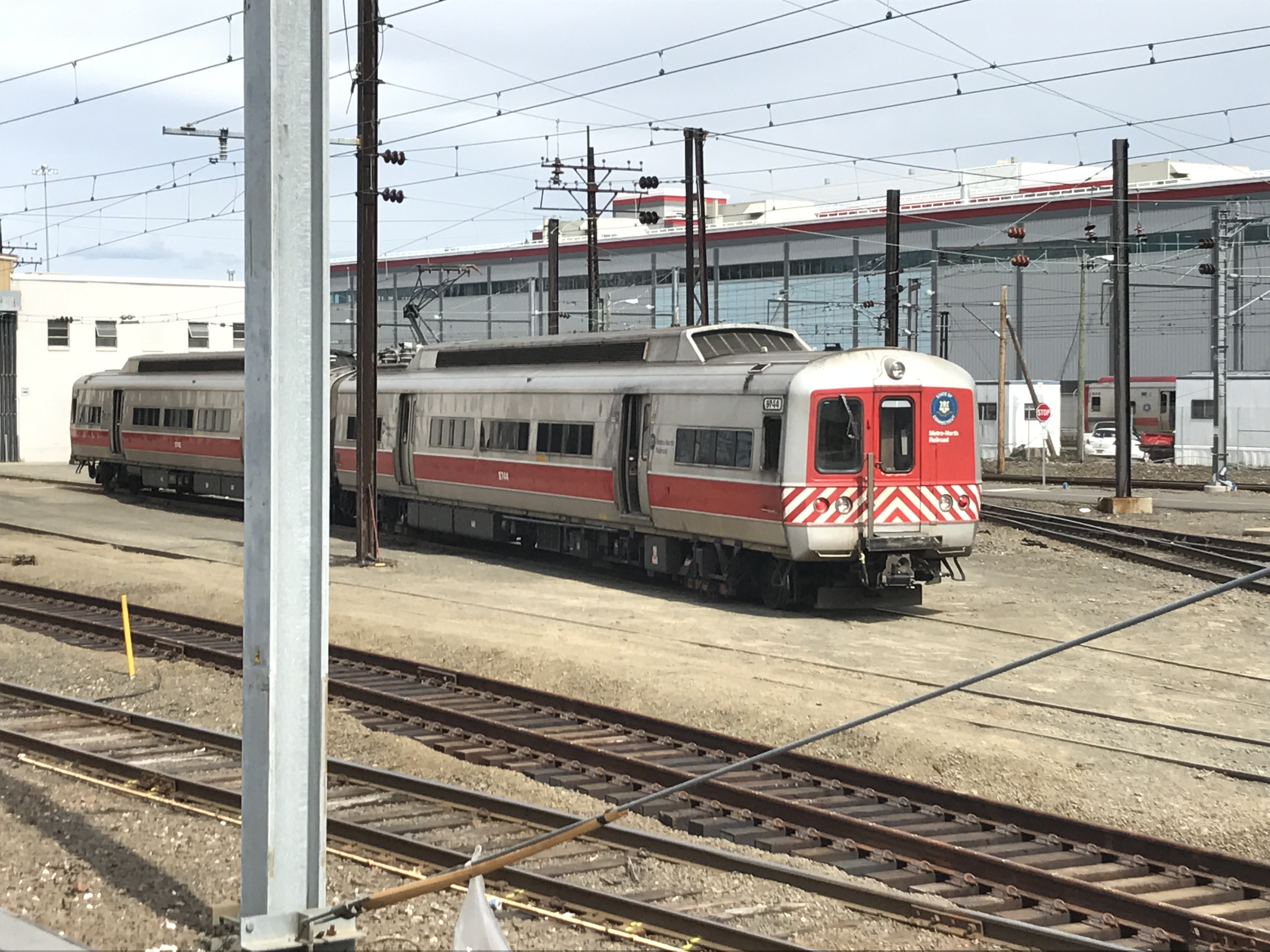
Metro North M2 multiple units in New Haven Yard

New Haven Yard, also known as New Haven Rail Yard, is a rail yard located in New Haven, Connecticut. It serves Metro-North Railroad and Amtrak trains. Situated on 1,600 acres of land near New Haven Union Station, it is a major facility for repair and maintenance for most Amtrak, Metro-North, and CT Rail operations in Connecticut.

== Upgrade ==
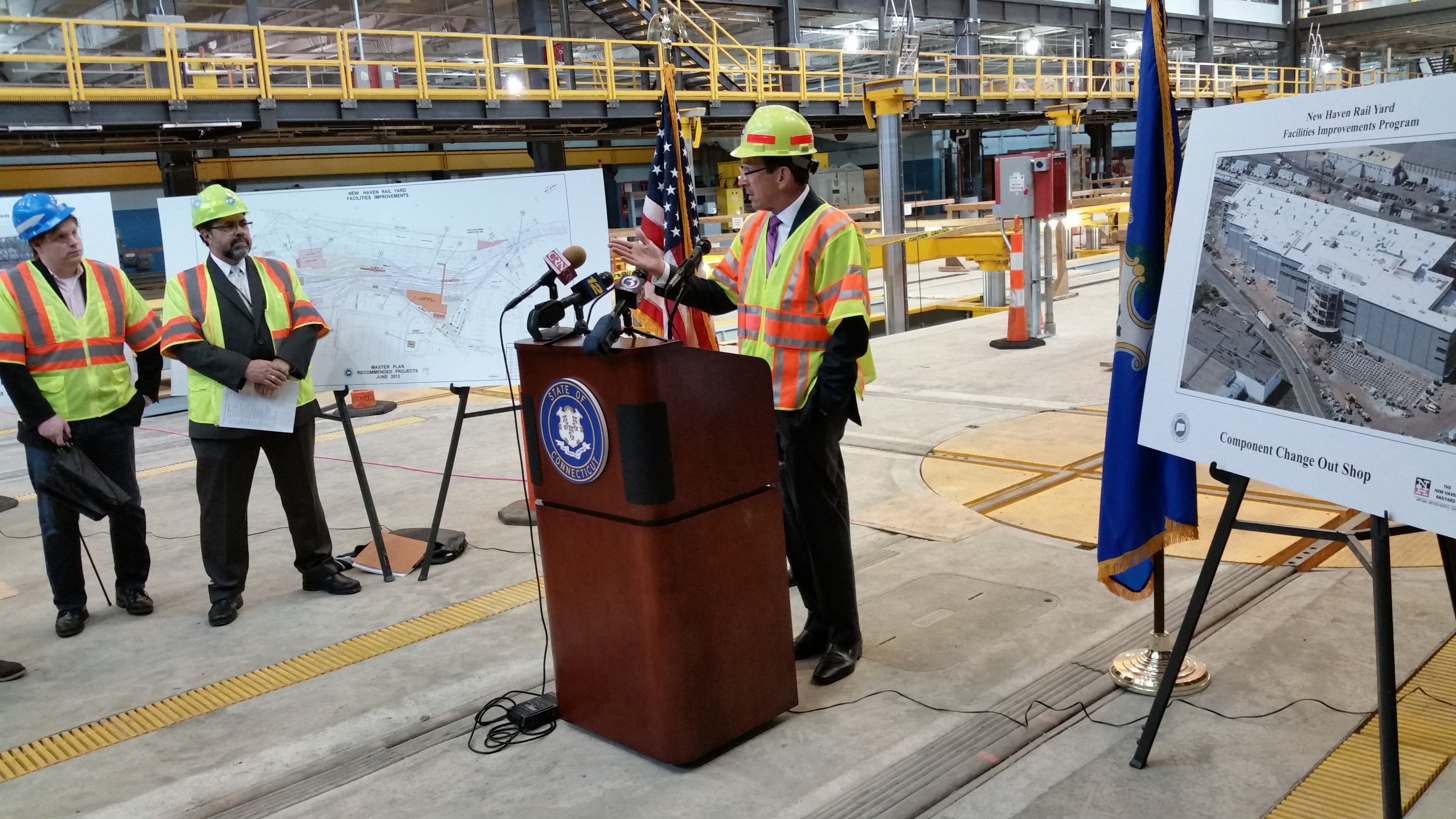
Connecticut governor Dannel Malloy visited New Haven Yard in 2014 to discuss the facility's upgrade

In 2014, the administration of governor Dannel Malloy announced a more than $1 billion project to upgrade and expand the New Haven Yard in preparation for the arrival of new M8 railcars for Metro-North service. The biggest addition from this project was a car maintenance facility with a capacity for 26 railcars at a time. Malloy said of the New Haven Yard "This stuff doesn’t get seen and therefore doesn’t get understood but this is a massive facility."

The yard's facility for servicing diesel locomotives was also expanded during the project, to support Shore Line East and Hartford Line services. Additionally, a facility for M8 acceptance testing was built, as well as a facility for wheel truing (straightening and repair of wheels). Following completion of the project, New Haven Yard was projected to expand its staff to 1,600 workers.
