= New Haven–Springfield Line =

Railroad line in Connecticut and Massachusetts, U.S.

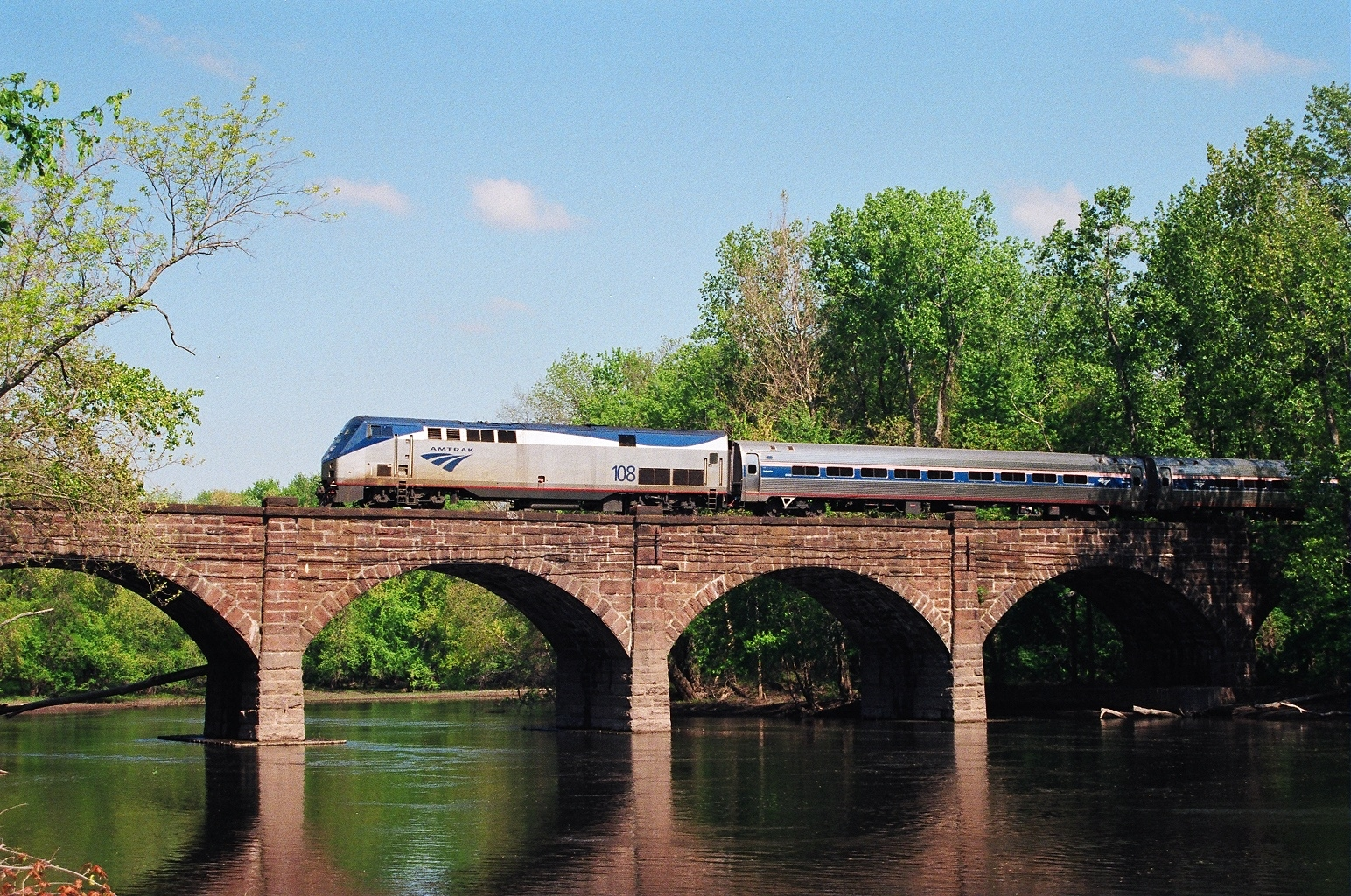
- An Amtrak train crossing the Farmington River in 2015

Overview
- Status: Operating
- Owner: Amtrak
- Locale: Connecticut and Massachusetts
- Termini: Union Station, New Haven, Connecticut; Union Station, Springfield, Massachusetts
- Stations: 9

Service
- Type: Inter-city rail Commuter rail
- System: Amtrak
- Services: Amtrak Hartford Line; Valley Flyer; Northeast Regional; Vermonter; Hartford Line
- Operator(s): Amtrak, CT Rail, Connecticut Southern Railroad (freight)

History
- Opened: 1844; 182 years ago

Technical
- Line length: 62 miles (100 km)
- Number of tracks: 1–2
- Track gauge: 4 ft 8 1/2 in (1,435 mm) standard gauge
- Operating speed: Up to 110 mph (180 km/h)

The New Haven–Springfield Line is a railroad line owned by Amtrak from New Haven, Connecticut, north to Springfield, Massachusetts, serving the Knowledge Corridor. As a branch of the Northeast Corridor just north of New Haven State Street station, it is served by approximately seven daily Northeast Regional round trips, some continuing from New Haven to Washington, D.C., along the Corridor and others terminating at New Haven as shuttles. On weekends, there is one train daily to Roanoke, Virginia. It is also served by the daily Vermonter, which starts in Washington, D.C., and continues north from Springfield, finally terminating in St. Albans, Vermont. The line is part of the Inland Route connecting Boston and New York via Hartford, Springfield, and Worcester, in contrast to the "Shore Line" along the Connecticut Shore and through Rhode Island.

The line was originally built by the Hartford and New Haven Railroad, and opened to Springfield in 1844. In 2004, Congress added the New Haven–Springfield Line onto the Northern New England Corridor, one of ten federally designated corridors for potential high-speed rail service. Upgrades needed for higher-speed rail, including rebuilding portions of double tracking removed in the 1980s, were performed in preparation for the CT Rail Hartford Line commuter service, which launched on June 16, 2018.

== History ==
The New Haven–Springfield Line was built by the Hartford and New Haven Railroad (H&NH) and began operations in 1844, forming the first all-rail route between Boston and New Haven, with steamship service on Long Island Sound completing service to New York. The Shore Line, today's Northeast Corridor, was completed in 1858, but the Springfield route continued to carry most traffic until the bridge over the Thames River at New London, Connecticut, opened in 1889.

The H&NH was merged into the New York, New Haven and Hartford Railroad (NYNH&H) in 1872, and the NYNH&H continued to operate regular service between New York City and Springfield over the line. Various services were also operated over the Inland Route, starting July 1, 1911, by agreement of the NYNH&H and the New York Central and Hudson River Railroad (lessee of the Boston and Albany Railroad).

During the 1940s period of peak passenger volume, the NYNH&H ran several New York City - Boston trains through the Inland Route, that is, via New Haven, Hartford, Springfield and Worcester, in the #50s series of train numbers. The service included an overnight train with sleeping car service. By the mid-1950s these trips needed transfers in Springfield.

By the startup of Amtrak on May 1, 1971, the Inland Route was no longer in use, but frequent Penn Central trains continued to serve the New Haven–Springfield Line. Amtrak continued the Connecticut Yankee (by that time shortened to Philadelphia-Springfield) along the route. On May 17, 1971, Amtrak added a train between Philadelphia and Boston via the Inland Route. With the November 14, 1971 timetable, this was assigned the name Bay State, and extended south from Philadelphia to Washington, DC. The train was discontinued March 1, 1975, though on October 31 of that year, the Boston section of the Lake Shore Limited began, restoring Springfield–Boston service.

On April 1, 1976, Amtrak acquired the New Haven–Springfield Line from the newly formed Conrail, along with most of the Northeast Corridor.

During the mid-1980s, due to the high cost of operating the New Haven–Springfield Line and the competing newly constructed expressways, Amtrak removed 25 miles (40 km) of track, turning the line from a double-track line to a line with a single track with passing sidings. Of the 62 miles (100 km) between New Haven and Springfield, 23.3 miles (37.5 km) of double track and 38.7 miles (62.3 km) of single track were left.

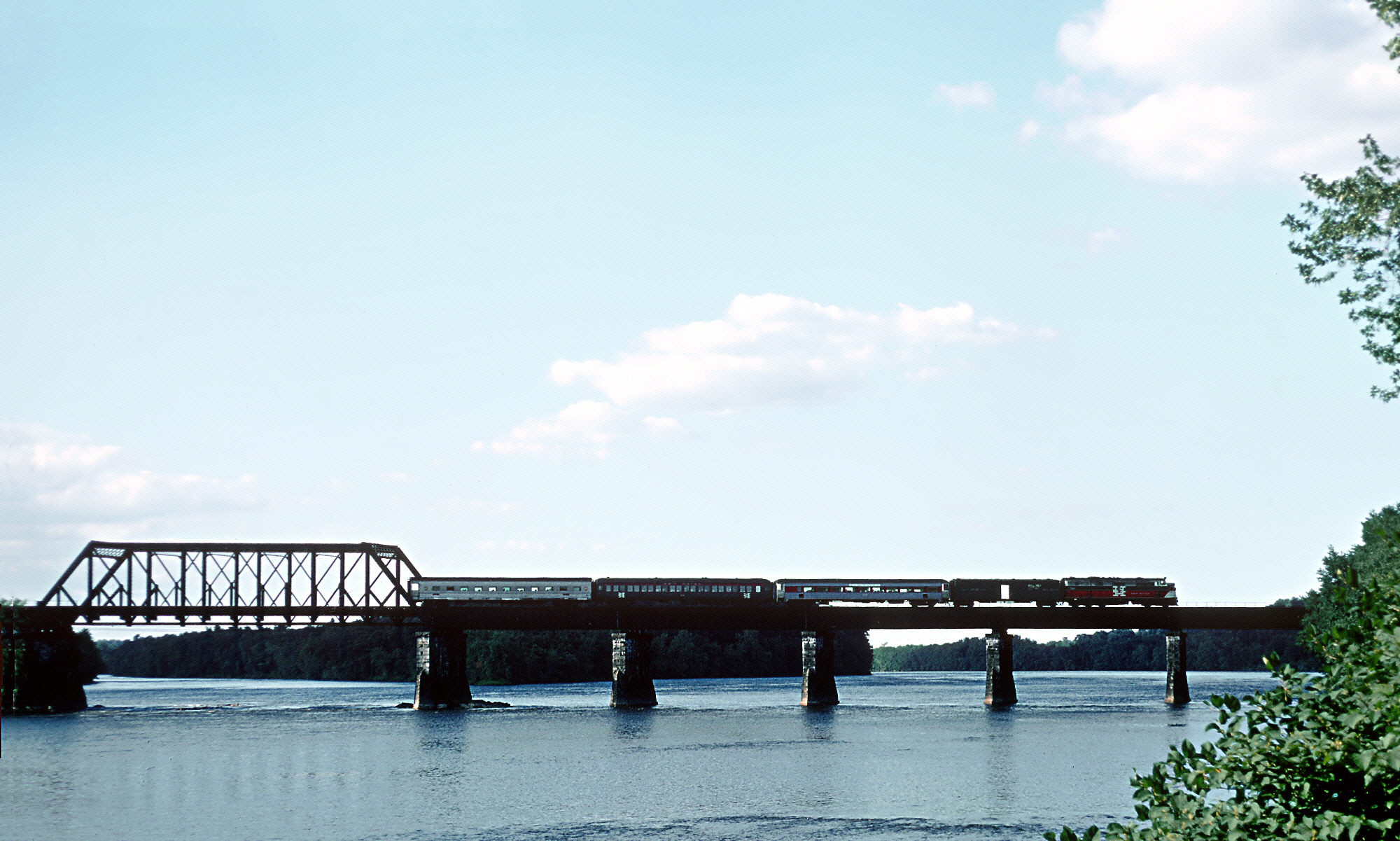
A New Haven Railroad train crossing the Warehouse Point railroad bridge in July 1968

The final iteration of Inland Route service began with the November 10, 1996, timetable, with the extension of the daily Virginia Service train 85/86 to Boston via Springfield. That train was later truncated, and the former Washington–Boston Bay State was reinstated via the Inland Route. By the October 28, 2002, schedule, trains 140 (weekend) and 142 (weekday) provided northbound Inland Route service, while the only weekend service was provided southbound via the 147. Train 142 was dropped October 27, 2003, and the November 1, 2004, timetable dropped 140 and 147, ending the use of the Inland Route.

On May 22, 2012, construction started on the CT Fastrak busway between New Britain and Hartford in the northern two track slots between Hartford and Newington Junction. The southern two track slots are used for the active double-track rail line. Any future re-addition of a third or fourth track would require removing or relocating the busway.

The connection between a new double track section from Hartford to Windsor and an existing section from north of Windsor to south of Windsor Locks was completed on September 25, 2018, leaving less than twelve miles (19 km) of single track on the line. The new section was not expected to allow additional service, but to increase reliability.

=== Interstate 84 ===
One proposal to replace the aging Interstate 84 viaduct through Hartford as part of the I-84 Hartford Project is an at-grade roadbed, which would require relocating the rail tracks and busway north of the new road. The viaduct crosses the tracks and busway twice, a route dictated by the placement of abutting development back when the viaduct was constructed in the 1960s. Subsequent demolition has made the proposal to move the tracks a viable option to consider.

== Amtrak Hartford Line ==
Amtrak runs Hartford Line trains between Springfield, Massachusetts, and New Haven, Connecticut. These trains connect with Northeast Regional or Metro-North New Haven Line service at New Haven's Union Station, usually by a cross-platform or same-track transfer. The Hartford Line trains are in the 400 series, with the last two digits usually denoting the number of the Amtrak train it is connecting to. In September 2019, Amtrak adopted the state of Connecticut's Hartford Line branding for its trains on the line, replacing the Shuttle designation. The branding is shared with the state operated CTrail commuter trains which also serve the corridor. Together the two services make up the Hartford Line commuter rail program.

Today, Amtrak service on the line takes the form of shuttle trains, Valley Flyer trains or Northeast Regional through trains. The shuttle trains meet Acela and Northeast Regional services at New Haven Union Station where passengers can typically make a cross-platform transfer between trains. Valley Flyer trains also offer the same connecting service at New Haven, but continue past Springfield north to Greenfield, Massachusetts. Two Northeast Regional round trips operate daily between Washington, D.C. and Springfield, with at least one southbound trip continuing into Virginia.

== Hartford Line ==
The Connecticut Department of Transportation (CTDOT) and the Massachusetts Executive Office of Transportation studied adding a dedicated New Haven–Hartford–Springfield Commuter Rail Line between New Haven and Springfield to create a more accessible commuter connection to the Metro North commuter lines between New York City and Southwestern Connecticut, and also give more transit options to people commuting within the Knowledge Corridor region surrounding Hartford and Springfield. As part of this, extending or adding stations and right of way and new rail options were investigated. The study culminated in a final report in 2005, which was presented for a grant application to the Federal Transit Administration New Starts program.

Construction added 27 miles (43 km) of double track as well as 2 miles (3.2 km) of new passing sidings, leaving less than 12 miles (19 km) of single track. Five new interlockings were built and new signal systems were installed, including the installation of Positive Train Control. Bridges and culverts on the line have been repaired, rehabilitated or replaced. Stations at Wallingford, Meriden, and Berlin were completely rebuilt, while New Haven State Street and Hartford had improvements made.

New Hartford Line commuter rail service on the line began on June 16, 2018. Expanded Amtrak Shuttle service on the line launched one week earlier on June 9, 2018. Connecticut DOT provides eight round trip commuter trains on weekdays under its CT Rail branding that are operated by its new contractor, a joint venture between TransitAmerica Services and Alternate Concepts Inc. Half of these trains operate between New Haven and Hartford, with the other four running the whole line between New Haven and Springfield. Amtrak added three new Shuttle round trips on top of its previous service. This brings the total round trips on the line to sixteen between New Haven and Hartford, with twelve of them operating along the full line to Springfield. On weekends and holidays, CT Rail operates four New Haven–Hartford round trips and three New Haven–Springfield round trips. Amtrak continues to offer its existing weekend service with some minor schedule changes. Together, 12–13 round trips are offered on weekends.

== Stations ==
The Springfield–New Haven corridor is served by some Northeast Regional trains in the 136 and 140 series. These trains provide direct service from Springfield to Washington, D.C., without the need to change trains in New Haven.

| Miles (km) | State | Municipality | Station | Line services | | | Other rail services |
| Miles (km) | State | Municipality | Station | HL | NR | VT | Other rail services |
|---|---|---|---|---|---|---|---|
| 0 (0) | MA | Springfield | Springfield Union Station | ● | ● | ● | Amtrak: Lake Shore Limited |
| 14.6 (23.5) | CT | Windsor Locks | Windsor Locks | ● | ● | ● | |
| 19.1 (30.7) | CT | Windsor | Windsor | ● | ● | | |
| 25.3 (40.7) | CT | Hartford | Hartford Union Station | ● | ● | ● | |
| 35.9 (57.8) | CT | Berlin | Berlin | ● | ● | | |
| 43.3 (69.7) | CT | Meriden | Meriden | ● | ● | ● | |
| 49.0 (78.9) | CT | Wallingford | Wallingford | ● | ● | | |
| 61.4 (98.8) | CT | New Haven | New Haven State Street | ● | ● | | CTrail: Shore Line East; Metro-North Railroad: New Haven Line |
| 62.0 (99.8) | CT | New Haven | New Haven Union Station | ● | ● | ● | Amtrak: Acela, Northeast Regional; CTrail: Shore Line East; Metro-North Railroad: New Haven Line |
