= Meriden Transit Center =

Train station in Meriden, Connecticut, US

Meriden
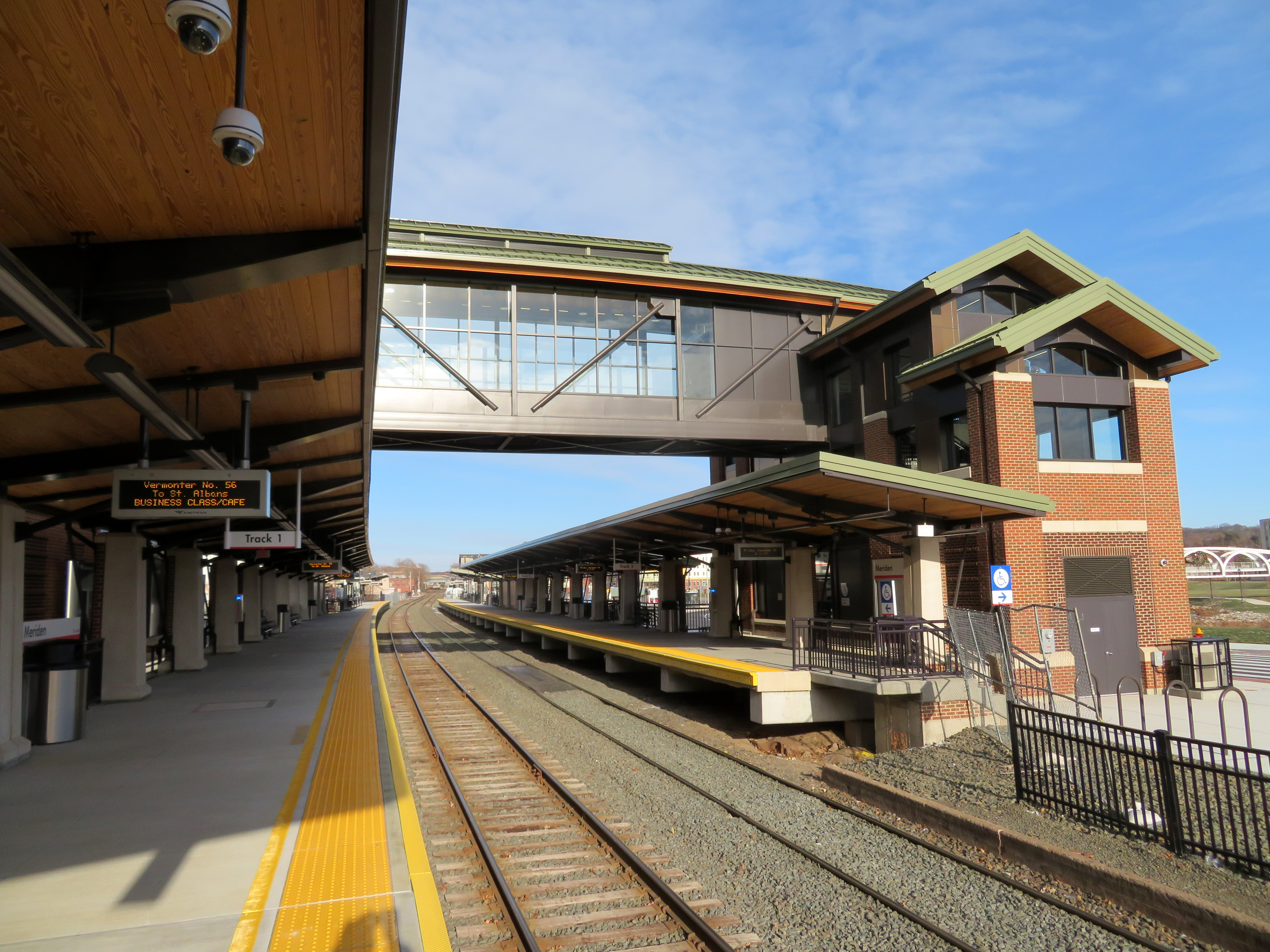
- The newly rebuilt Meriden station in December 2017

General information
- Location: 60 State Street, Meriden, Connecticut; United States
- Coordinates: 41.5394°N 72.8008°W
- Owner: ConnDOT
- Line: New Haven–Springfield Line
- Platforms: 2 side platforms
- Tracks: 2
- Bus stands: 4
- Connections: CT Transit: 215, 511, 561, 563, 564, 565, 566; Middletown Area Transit: M Link

Construction
- Parking: Surface lot: 65 spaces; Garage: 225 spaces
- Cycle facilities: Racks
- Accessible: Yes
- Architect: Michael Baker International

Other information
- Station code: Amtrak: MDN

History
- Opened: December 3, 1838
- Rebuilt: July 22, 1882; September 21, 1942; October 15, 1970–August 30, 1971; 2014–2017

Passengers
- FY 2025: 26,578 (Amtrak)

Services
Preceding station	Amtrak	Following station
Wallingford toward Norfolk, Newport News or Roanoke	Northeast Regional	Berlin toward Springfield
Wallingford toward New Haven	Hartford Line	Berlin toward Springfield
Wallingford toward New Haven	Valley Flyer	Berlin toward Greenfield
New Haven toward Washington, D.C.	Vermonter	Hartford toward St. Albans
Preceding station	CT Rail	Following station
Wallingford toward New Haven Union Station	Hartford Line	Berlin toward Springfield
Former services
Preceding station	Amtrak	Following station
New Haven toward Washington, D.C.	Montrealer	Berlin toward Montreal
Wallingford toward Atlantic City	Atlantic City Express 1991–1995	Berlin toward Springfield
Location

Meriden Transit Center is a train station on the New Haven–Springfield Line located in Meriden, Connecticut. It is served by Amtrak's Northeast Regional, Valley Flyer, and Vermonter, in addition to Hartford Line commuter rail service, consisting of Connecticut Department of Transportation and Amtrak trains. The station was rebuilt from 2014 to 2017 for the Hartford Line service, which began on June 16, 2018.

== History ==
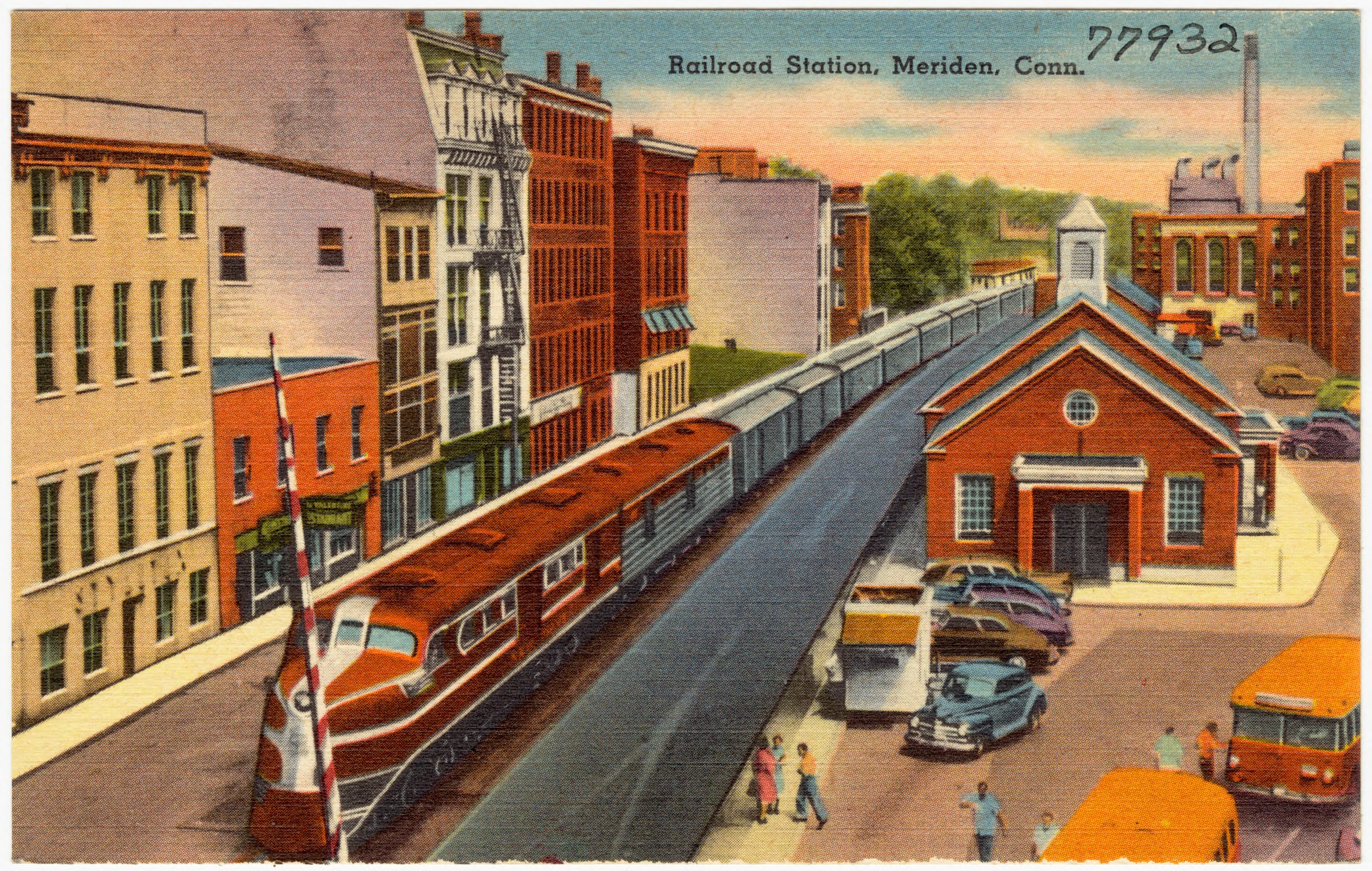
Postcard of the 1942-built Meriden station shortly after its construction

The Hartford and New Haven Railroad opened from New Haven to Meriden in December 1838, and to Hartford in December 1839. The initial station was "shed-like"; services were moved to Conklin's Hotel in 1840 and the Rodgers Building in 1842.

The New York, New Haven and Hartford Railroad built a brick Colonial Revival station in 1942. The city demolished that station and built a one-story brick station in 1970 as part of a downtown revitalization program.

=== Reconstruction ===
The station was reconstructed for use by Hartford Line commuter service, which began operation on June 16, 2018. The new station, located on the site of the 1970-built station, has two accessible six car long, high-level side platforms connected by an overhead pedestrian bridge. It is not staffed, heated, or equipped with toilet facilities. It has 65 surface parking spaces, and 225 spaces reserved for Hartford Line customers in a nearby garage. Demolition of an adjacent building to make room for the parking lot began in October 2014.

The ticket office in the 1970-built station building was closed on March 4, 2016, and the station building itself closed for demolition on March 12. The old platform was replaced by a temporary boarding area on March 28, 2016. The frame of the new station was completed in July 2016. The rebuilt Meriden station opened on November 19, 2017, though final construction lasted until December 18.

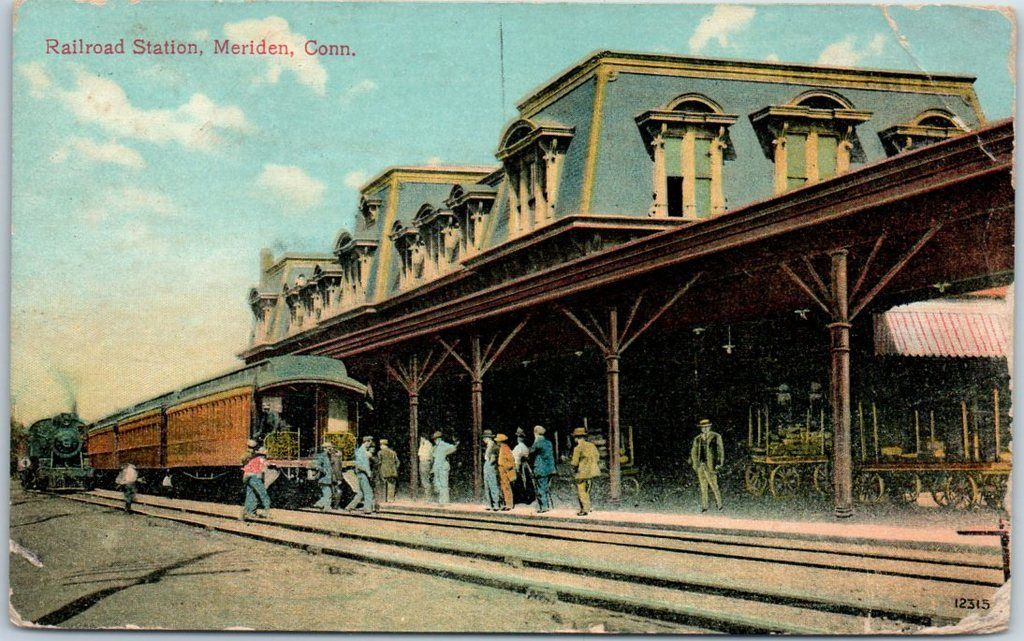
The 1882-built station on a 1908 postcard

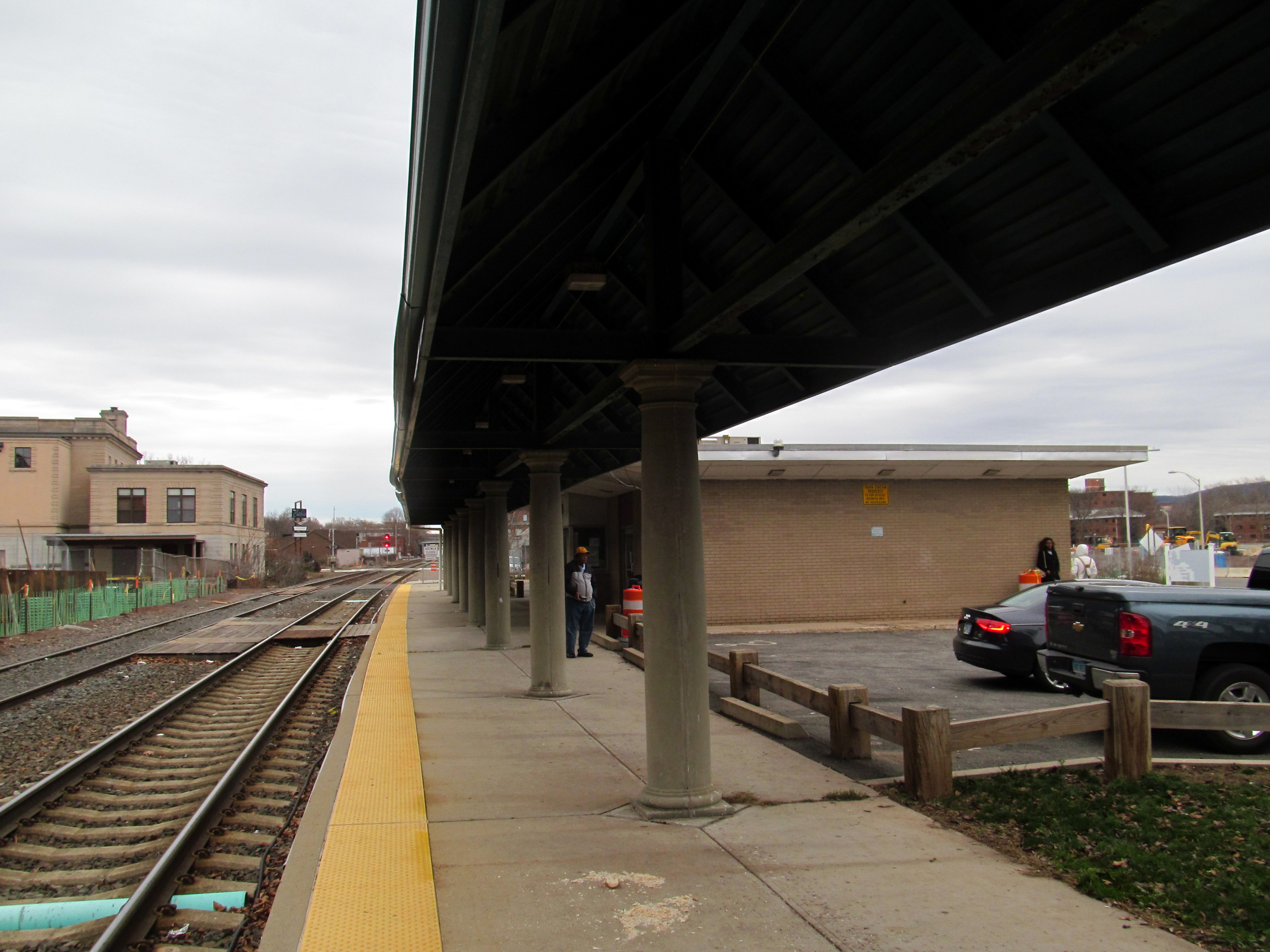
The 1970-built station in 2015

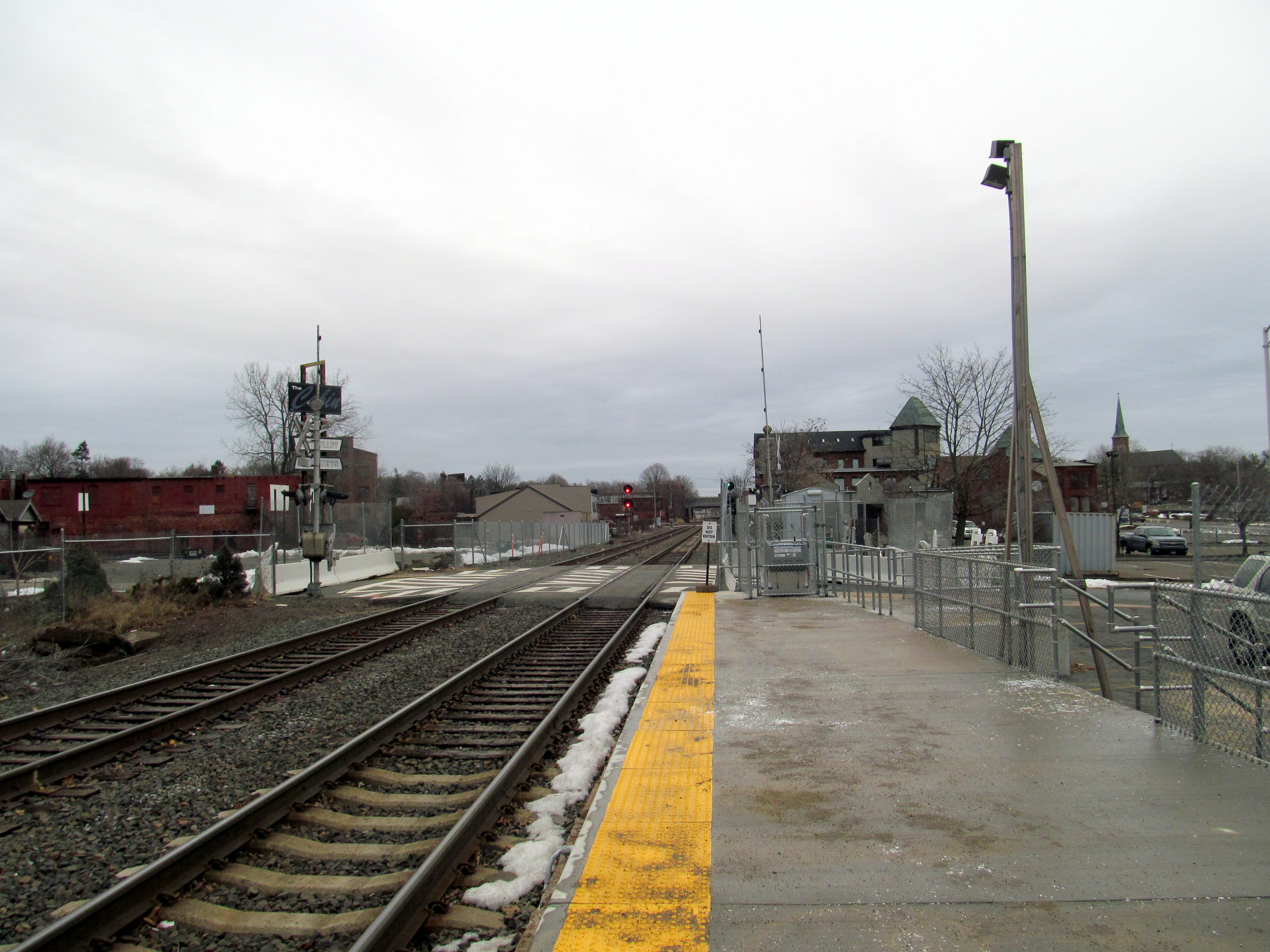
Temporary platform used in 2016–17

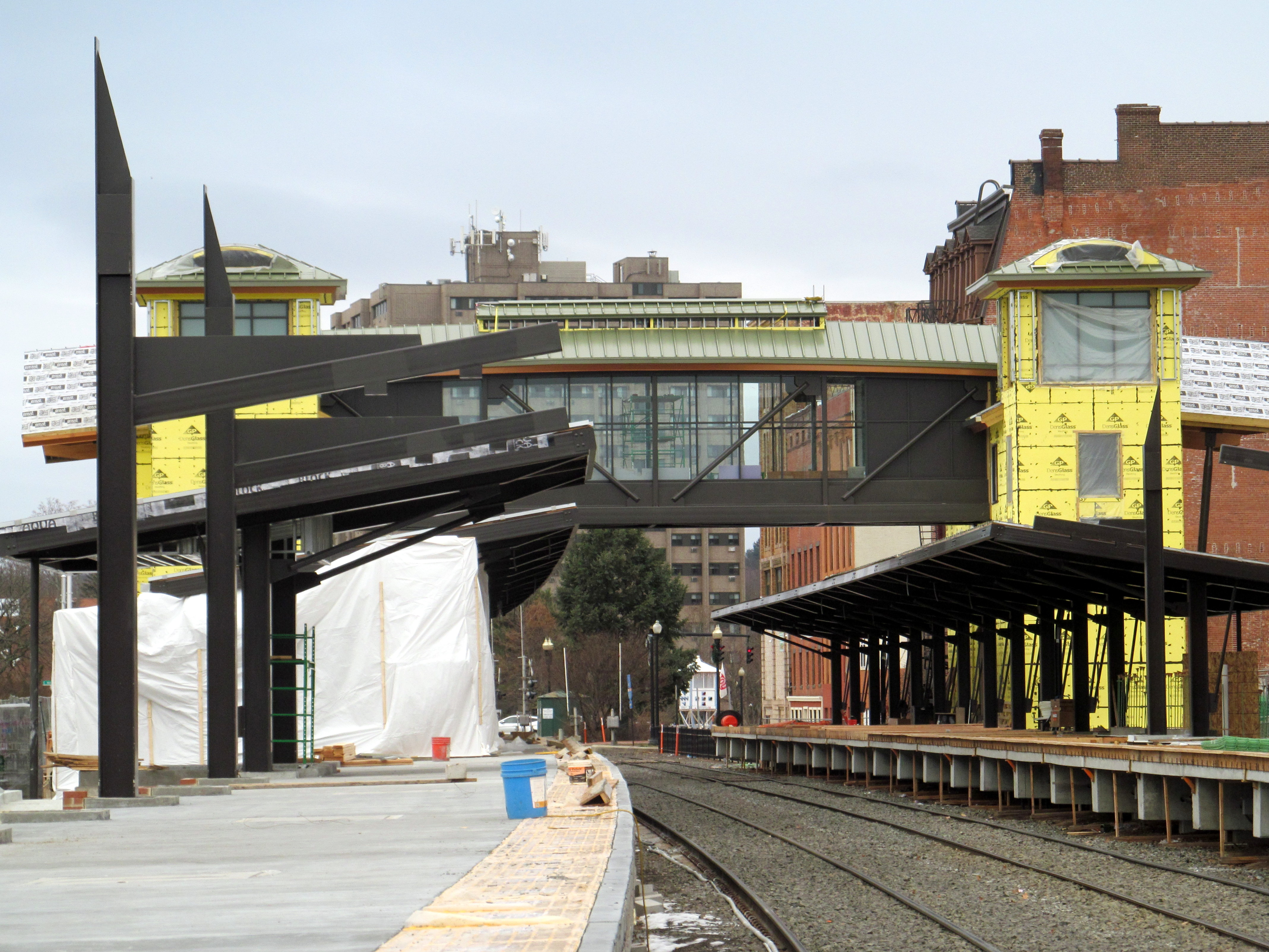
New station under construction in 2016

== Connections ==
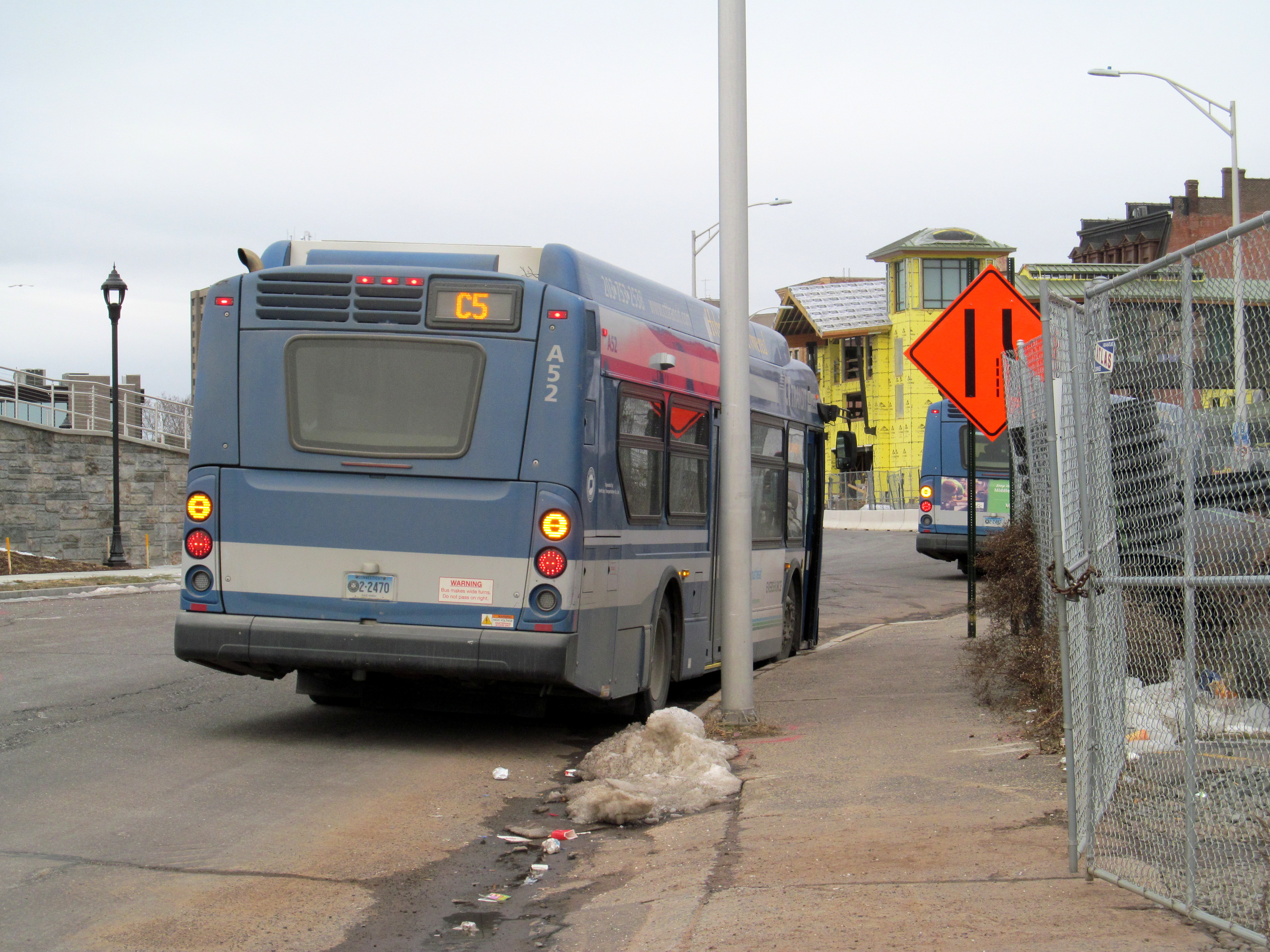
A route C5 bus at Meriden in December 2016

Meriden is served by bus routes on three local systems:

- Connecticut Transit Meriden: 561, 563, 564, 565, 566
- Connecticut Transit New Britain: 511
- Connecticut Transit New Haven: 215M/215Mx
- Middletown Area Transit: M-Link
