= Hartford Union Station =

Train station in Hartford, Connecticut, US

Hartford, CT
- Hartford Union Station in October 2026

General information
- Location: One Union Place; Hartford, Connecticut; United States
- Coordinates: 41°46′08″N 72°40′54″W
- Owner: Greater Hartford Transit District
- Line: New Haven–Springfield Line
- Platforms: 1 side platform
- Tracks: 1
- Bus stands: 15
- Connections: CTtransit; Greyhound Lines; Peter Pan

Construction
- Accessible: Yes

Other information
- Station code: Amtrak: HFD
- IATA code: ZRT

History
- Rebuilt: 1889, 1914, 1987

Passengers
- FY 2025: 226,313 (Amtrak)
Services
Preceding station	Amtrak	Following station
Berlin toward Norfolk, Newport News or Roanoke	Northeast Regional	Windsor toward Springfield
Berlin toward New Haven	Hartford Line	Windsor toward Springfield
Berlin toward New Haven	Valley Flyer	Windsor toward Greenfield
Meriden toward Washington, D.C.	Vermonter	Windsor Locks toward St. Albans
Preceding station	CT Rail	Following station
Berlin toward New Haven Union Station	Hartford Line	Windsor toward Springfield
Preceding station	CT Transit	Following station
Sigourney Street toward Downtown New Britain	CT Fastrak	Terminus
Former services
Preceding station	Amtrak	Following station
Berlin toward Washington, D.C.	Montrealer	Springfield toward Montreal
Berlin toward Atlantic City	Atlantic City Express 1991-1995	Windsor toward Springfield
- Hartford Union Station
- U.S. National Register of Historic Places
- Area: 3 acres (1.2 ha)
- Built: 1889
- Architect: George Keller
- Architectural style: Richardsonian Romanesque
- NRHP reference No.: 75001932
- Added to NRHP: November 25, 1975
Location

Hartford Union Station is a railroad station in Hartford, Connecticut, United States on the New Haven–Springfield Line. It is served by Amtrak Hartford Line, Northeast Regional, Valley Flyer, and Vermonter intercity rail service, plus CT Rail Hartford Line commuter rail service and CTfastrak bus rapid transit service.

The Richardsonian Romanesque building was designed by George Keller, executed by Shepley, Rutan and Coolidge and built in 1889. A 1914 fire required a rebuild; the interior was renovated in 1987. It has been listed on the National Register of Historic Places since 1975.

== Architecture ==
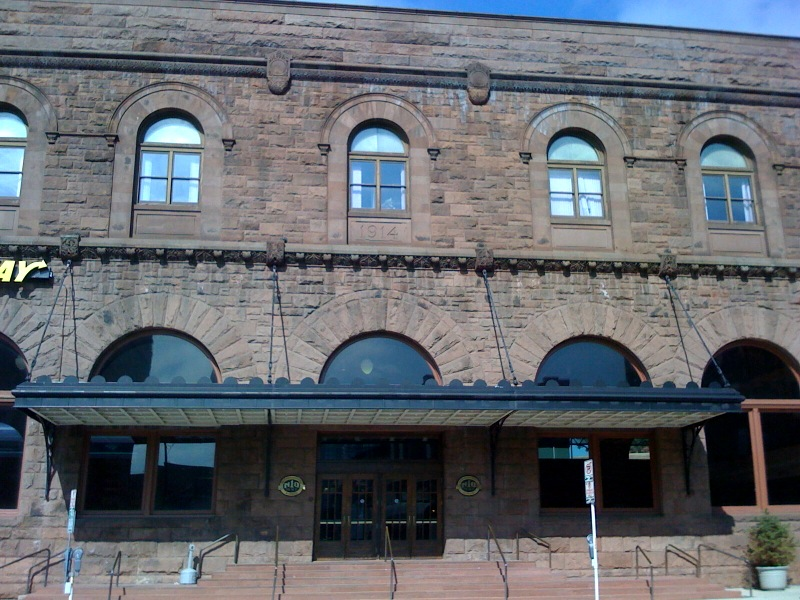
The station entrance

The station is located on the western edge of downtown Hartford, on a three-acre (1.2 ha) block between Union Place and Spruce Street on the east and west and Church and Asylum streets to the north and south. Opposite the main building on Union Place are a mixture of other old buildings and parking lots. To the west is a triangular parking lot and the viaduct carrying Interstate 84 and U.S. Route 6, which curves around the north of the station as well. Across Asylum on the south is Bushnell Park, also listed on the Register.

The main building is located between the tracks and Union Place. It is a three-story rectangular building in rough-faced Portland brownstone with two smaller, similarly shaped two-story wings on the north and south. The main building has a flat roof; the wings are gabled and tiled, with dormer windows piercing them at regular intervals.

On the east (front) facade, a wide set of steps rises to the main entrance, beneath a flat hood at the springlines of three of the large segmental arches that run across the first story. Above these is a stylized floral molded course. The second story has similar but smaller segmental arches set with a recessed panel and four-pane windows. The central bay has "1914" carved into its panel; all others are blank. The two wings have four-pane rectangular windows.

At the station level were originally four tracks (currently one) divided by a middle platform. Two sets of iron roofs create a train shed. On the wall side those roofs are supported by spiral-shaped iron brackets. In the middle columns and simple curved iron brackets support the trusses that hold up the shed roof.

The interior has been remodeled since the station was rebuilt. It is a mostly open area with stairs along the west wall leading up to the elevated tracks and benches along the east. Flooring is red tile. There are offices on the north and south; some look out over the main space.

== History ==
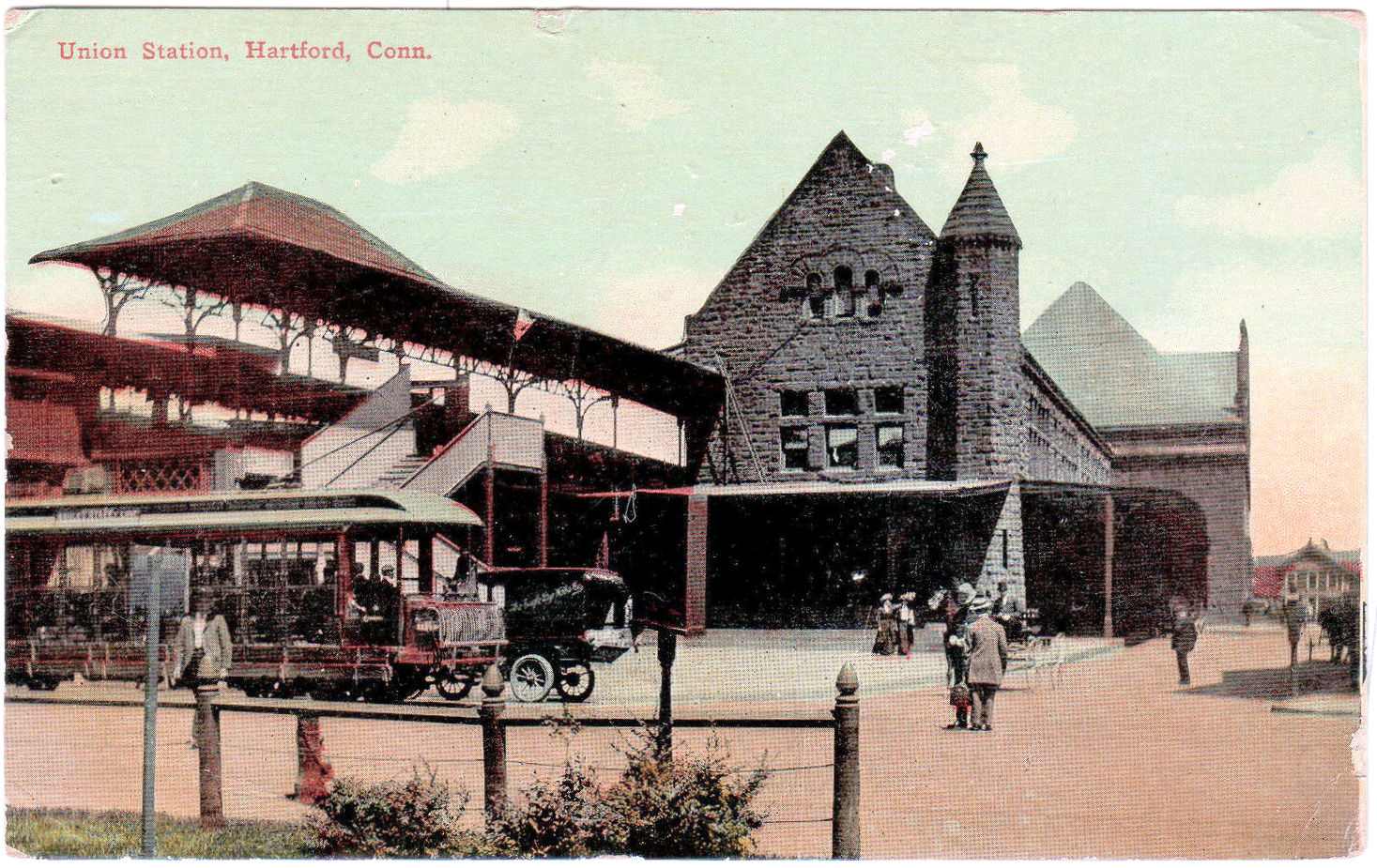
The station in 1912

The station was built in 1889, and served the Hartford and New Haven Railroad, Central New England Railway, Hartford and Connecticut Valley Railroad (all of which were acquired by the New York, New Haven and Hartford Railroad) and the New York and New England Railroad, but the entire structure had to be rebuilt after a fire in 1914. It was listed on the National Register of Historic Places as "Hartford Union Station" in 1975.

The station is currently served by one track and a side platform. The second track and platform were removed by Amtrak in the 1990s to reduce maintenance costs and because the underlying structure is no longer strong enough to support more than one train at a time. A 260-foot (79 m) section of the platform was converted to high level for accessible boarding as part of the Hartford Line project. It features a 29-inch (740 mm)-wide hinged edge that can be flipped up to allow wide freight trains to pass. The new platform opened on August 4, 2016. Hartford Line commuter rail service started on June 16, 2018.

CTfastrak service began on March 28, 2015, after fifteen years of planning and three years of construction.

The I-84 Hartford Project may require realigning the highway and rail line, in which case new platforms would be constructed on the new alignment, though Union Station would continue to be used for ticketing and waiting area. The state released a slate of 5 options - some just west of the current station, others slightly to the south - in October 2017. A decision on which option will be built was expected in early 2018. In November 2024, ConnDOT was awarded a $2.6 million federal grant for planning of the station relocation and associated double-tracking work.

== Services ==
=== Rail ===
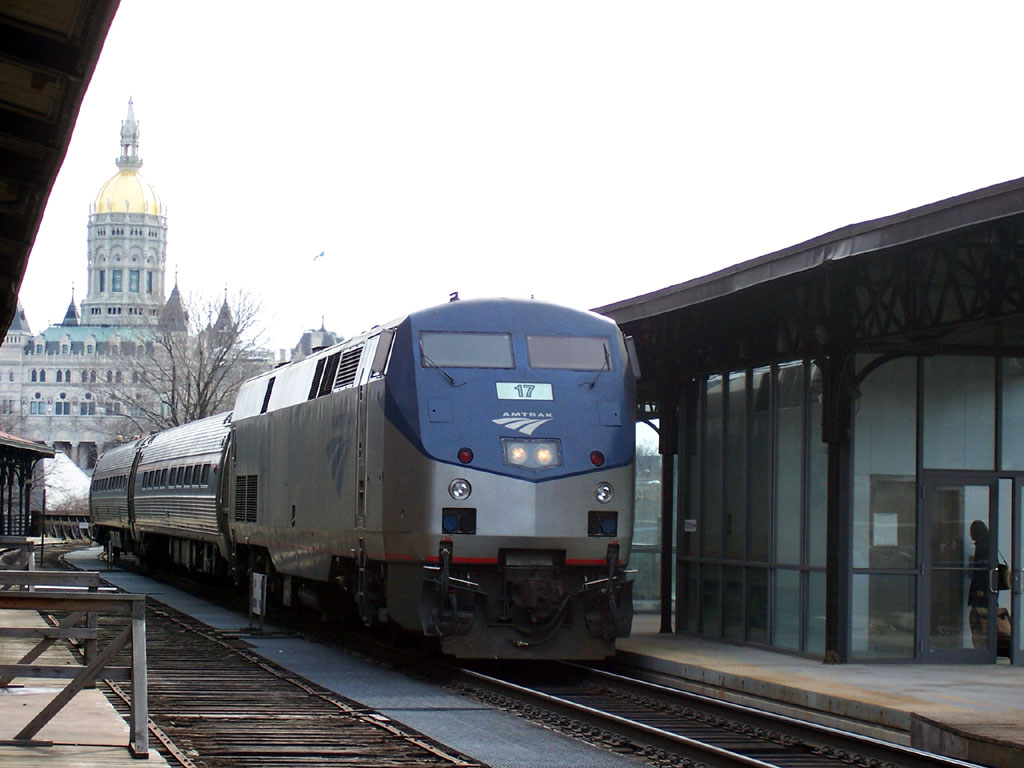
An Amtrak Shuttle (now Hartford Line) at Hartford in 2005

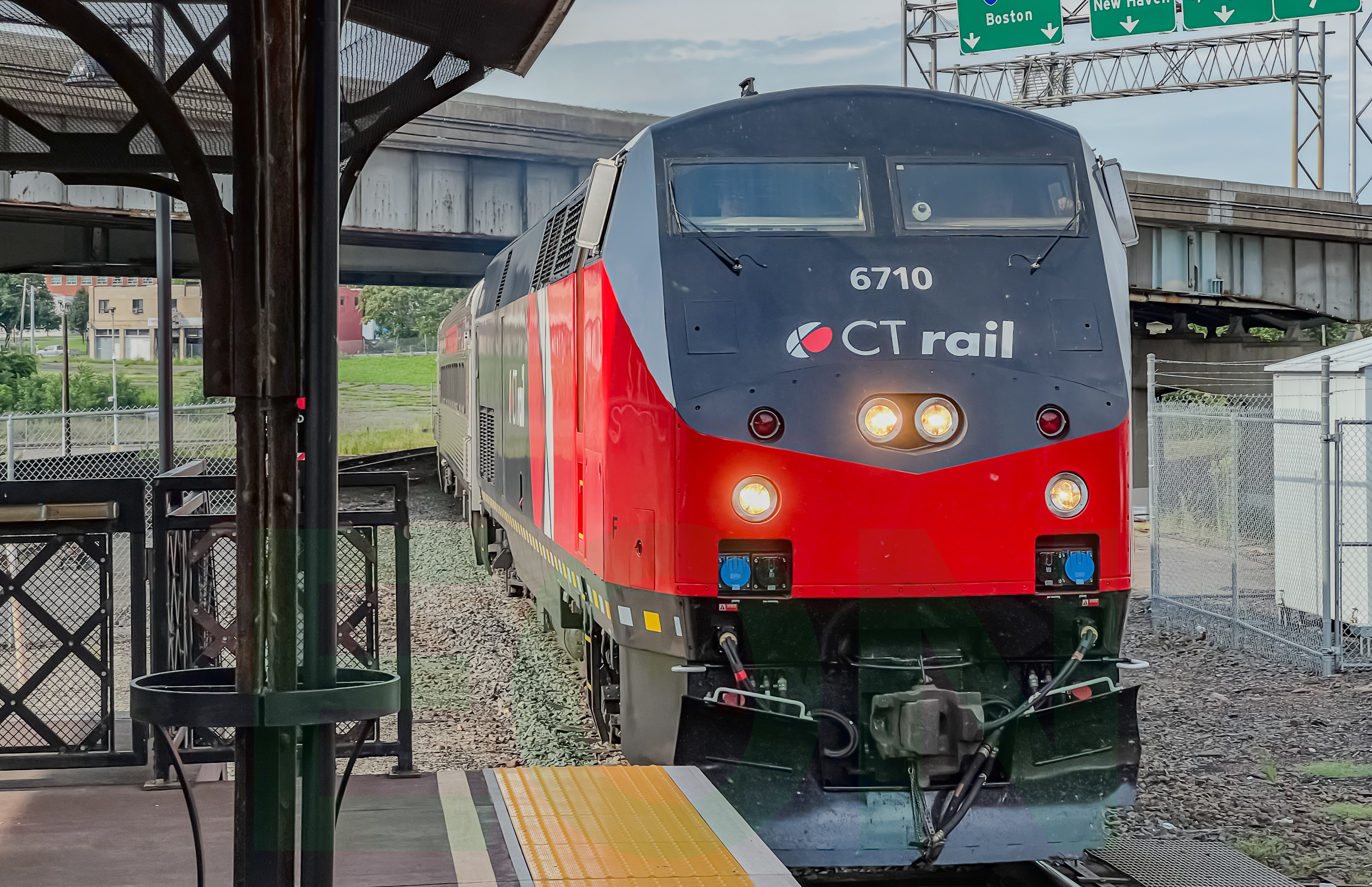
A CTrail Hartford Line train arriving at Hartford in 2024

Hartford is situated midway along the New Haven–Springfield Line, a non-electrified branch of the electrified Northeast Corridor. Amtrak operates four services through Hartford, with a total of about twenty trains per day in each direction. Four Amtrak services run on the New Haven–Springfield Line with a stop at Hartford: the Vermonter, the Valley Flyer, some Northeast Regional service, and the Hartford Line. Hartford Line commuter rail service is split between Amtrak trains and ConnDOT (CT Rail) trains.

=== Bus ===
Union Station serves as the northeastern terminus for CTfastrak, a bus rapid transit system operating between the station and Downtown New Britain in central Connecticut. Operated by Connecticut Transit, Five local and four express routes operate along the busway and over on-street loops in downtown Hartford.

CTTransit's Hartford Division provides local and express bus service to the station on a variety of routes. Greyhound, Peter Pan and FlixBus serve Union Station with intercity bus service.
