= Union Station (New Haven) =

Railroad station in Connecticut

New Haven
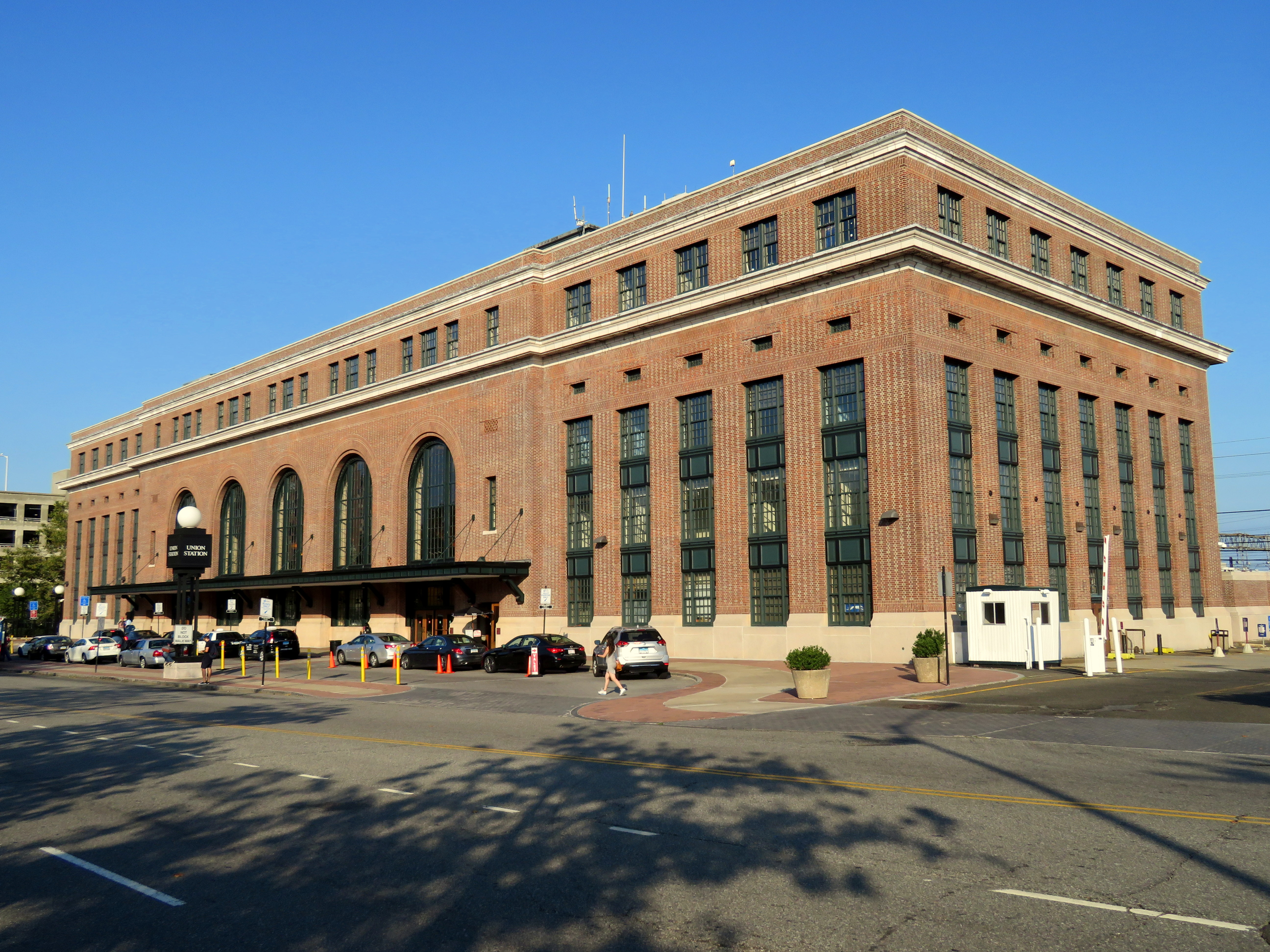
- New Haven Union Station in September 2018

General information
- Location: 50 Union Avenue; New Haven, Connecticut; United States
- Coordinates: 41°17′51″N 72°55′36″W
- Owner: ConnDOT
- Operator: New Haven Parking Authority
- Lines: ConnDOT New Haven Line (Northeast Corridor); New Haven–Springfield Line
- Platforms: 4 island platforms
- Tracks: 9
- Connections: CT Transit: 271, 272, 278, Union Station Shuttle; Greyhound; Megabus; Yale Shuttle

Construction
- Parking: Union Station parking garage
- Cycle facilities: Yes
- Accessible: Yes

Other information
- Station code: Amtrak: NHV
- IATA code: ZVE
- Fare zone: 21 (Metro-North)
- Website: unionstationnewhaven.com

History
- Opened: 1920
- Rebuilt: 1985

Passengers
- FY 2025: 853,267 annually (Amtrak)
- Nov. 2025: 5,285 daily boardings (Metro-North)
- 2019: 541 daily boardings (Shore Line East)
Services
Preceding station	Amtrak	Following station
Stamford toward Washington, D.C.	Acela	Providence toward Boston South
Bridgeport toward Norfolk, Newport News or Roanoke	Northeast Regional	Old Saybrook toward Boston South
Bridgeport toward Norfolk, Newport News or Roanoke	Northeast Regional	New Haven State Street toward Springfield
Terminus	Hartford Line	New Haven State Street toward Springfield
Terminus	Valley Flyer	New Haven State Street toward Greenfield
Bridgeport toward Washington, D.C.	Vermonter	Meriden toward St. Albans
Preceding station	CT Rail	Following station
Terminus	Shore Line East	New Haven State Street toward New London
West Haven limited weekday service toward Stamford	Shore Line East	New Haven State Street toward New London
Terminus	Hartford Line	New Haven State Street toward Springfield
Preceding station	Metro-North Railroad	Following station
West Haven toward Grand Central	New Haven Line	Terminus
West Haven toward Grand Central	New Haven Line	New Haven State Street peak service Terminus
Former services
Preceding station	Amtrak	Following station
Terminus	Beacon Hill	Branford toward Boston South
Terminus	Clamdigger	Branford toward New London
Bridgeport toward Washington, D.C.	Montrealer	Meriden toward Montreal
Stamford toward New York	Cape Codder	Providence toward Hyannis
Bridgeport toward Atlantic City	Atlantic City Express	Wallingford toward Springfield
Preceding station	New York, New Haven and Hartford Railroad	Following station
Woodmont toward New York	Main Line	Terminus
New York Penn Terminus	Main Line through service	Terminus
Terminus	Shore Line	East Haven toward Boston
- New Haven Railroad Station
- U.S. National Register of Historic Places
- Built: 1920
- Architect: Cass Gilbert
- Architectural style: Late 19th and 20th Century Revivals, Second Renaissance Revival
- NRHP reference No.: 75001941
- Added to NRHP: September 3, 1975
Location

New Haven Union Station is the main railroad passenger station in New Haven, Connecticut. It is the third such station in the city of New Haven, preceded by both an 1848 built station in a different location, and an 1879 built station near the current station's location. Designed by noted American architect Cass Gilbert, the present beaux-arts Union Station was completed and opened in 1920 after the previous Union Station (which was located at the foot of Meadow Street, near the site of the current Union Station parking garage) was destroyed by fire. It served the New York, New Haven and Hartford Railroad for the next five decades, but fell into decline following World War II along with the United States railroad industry as a whole.

The New Haven Railroad went bankrupt in 1961, and the station was transferred to the Penn Central Transportation Company along with the rest of the New Haven Railroad on January 1, 1969. Penn Central itself went bankrupt the next year, and the station building was closed in 1973 to cut costs, leaving only the under-track 'subway' open for passengers. The station was listed on the National Register of Historic Places on September 3, 1975, but it was almost demolished before being saved by the Northeast Corridor Improvement Project in 1979, which began work to rehabilitate the station building. Reopened after extensive renovations in early 1985, it is now the most important transportation hub in New Haven. In the 21st century, it is the busiest train station in the state of Connecticut by passengers served, as well as one of the most used stations in Amtrak's entire network.

The property is listed on the National Register of Historic Places as New Haven Railroad Station. Its significance is partly as an example of the work of Cass Gilbert, who also designed the Woolworth Building in New York and the U.S. Supreme Court Building. The restored building features interior limestone walls, ornate ceilings, chandeliers and striking stainless steel ceilings in the tunnels to the trains. The large waiting room is thirty-five feet high and features models of NYNH&HRR trains on the benches.

Located at the intersection of the Northeast Corridor and the New Haven–Springfield Line, the station serves a variety of train services, including Amtrak, CT Rail, and Metro-North.

== History ==
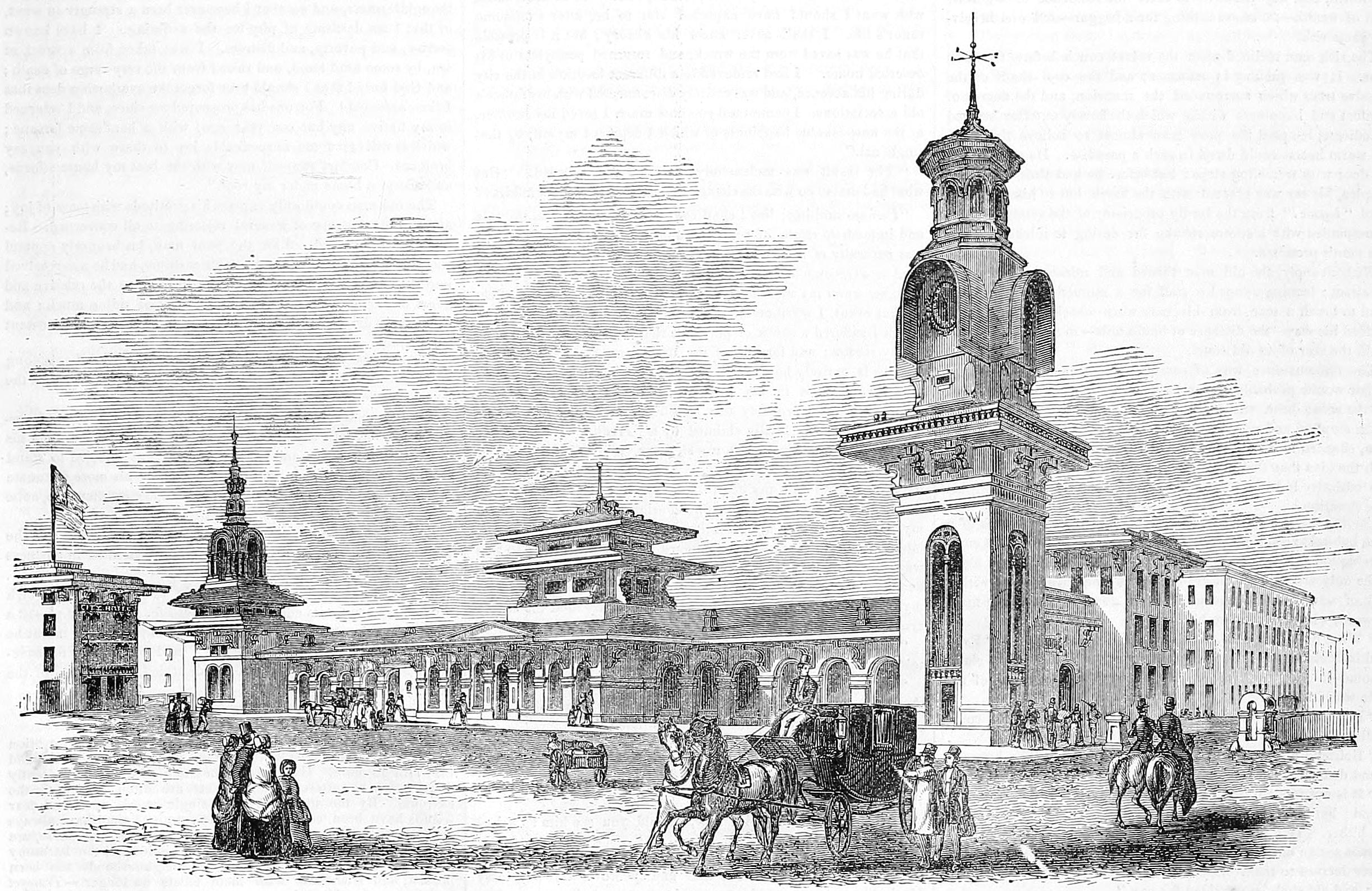
The first Union Station, in 1851

The current Union Station is the third such station to exist in New Haven; the first station, designed by Henry Austin, was opened in 1848 by the New York and New Haven Railroad. It was replaced by a new station in a different part of the city in 1879, under the auspices of the New York, New Haven and Hartford Railroad. This station served passengers in the city until it burned down in May 1918. In 1920, the New Haven Railroad opened the present station near the site of the previous station.

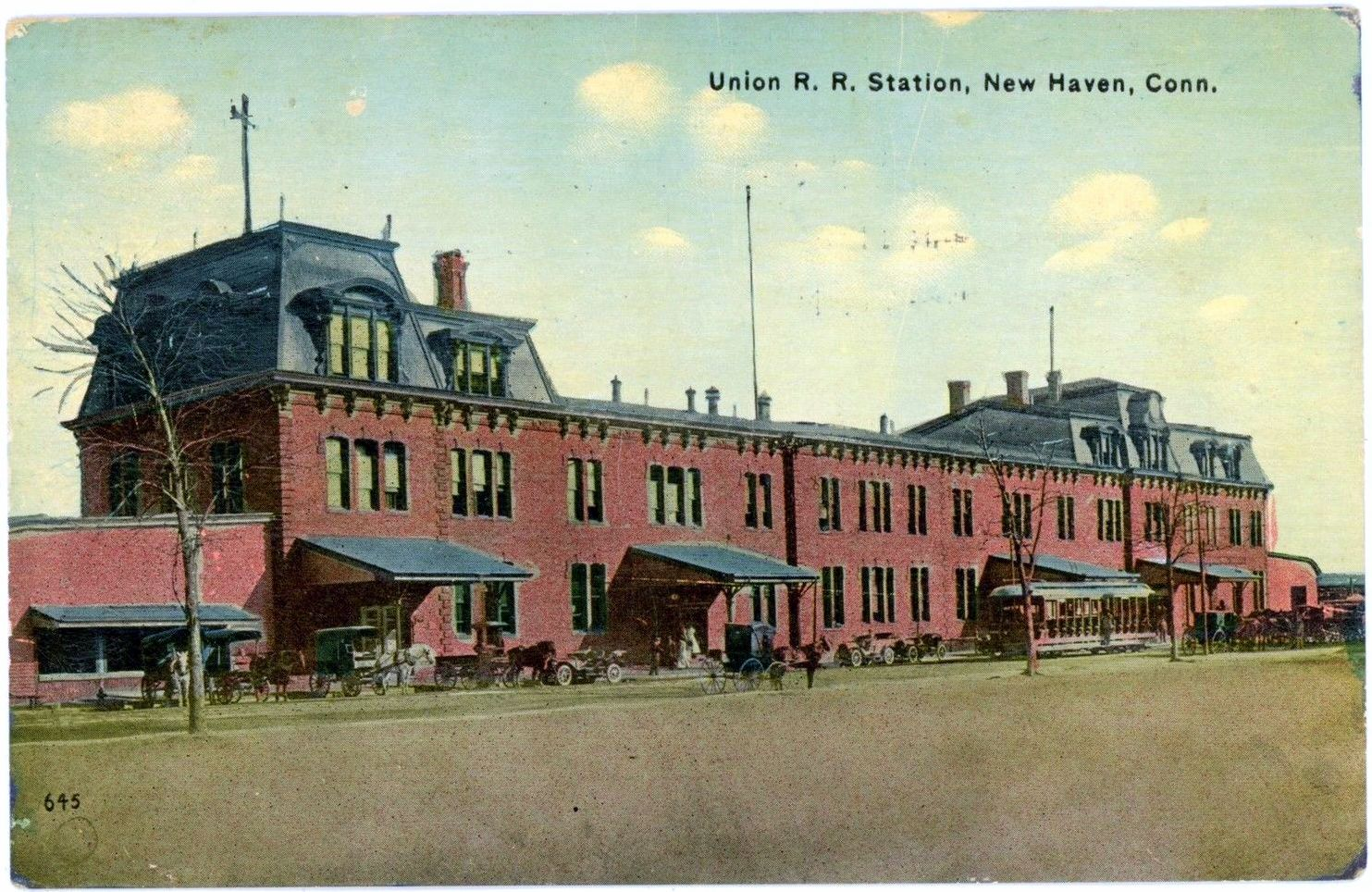
The second Union Station, seen in 1914

=== Decline ===
Following the Second World War, railroads faced increasing competition from airlines and automobiles, and passenger train service declined. The New Haven Railroad began to neglect the station's maintenance due to its own financial troubles. In 1973, the station was purchased from New Haven Railroad successor Penn Central by the Connecticut Department of Transportation (ConnDOT). That same year, the station building was closed to passengers as a means of reducing expenses, leaving only the station platforms and the connecting tunnels in use.

=== Revival ===
In 1982, the city of New Haven and the New Haven Parking Authority signed an agreement with the state of Connecticut to rehabilitate and reopen the station, along with improvements such as building a parking garage. A $28 million rehabilitation project began on March 28, 1983, with a combination of state and federal funding. Restoration included repairing the station's marble furnishings, repairing the large globe lights that hung from the ceiling, cleaning the walls and ceiling, and repairing and installing new wooden benches. With rehabilitation complete, the station building reopened to passengers in 1985. Since then, the station has been operated by the New Haven Parking Authority and leased to the city of New Haven by the state government.

In 2026, ConnDOT proposed renovating the station for $402 million. The project, which would begin in 2029 if funding were secured by that date, would include rebuilding the platforms and the canopy above them. The proposed project would include rebuilding a pedestrian tunnel under the platforms, dating from the 1980s renovation.

== Station layout ==
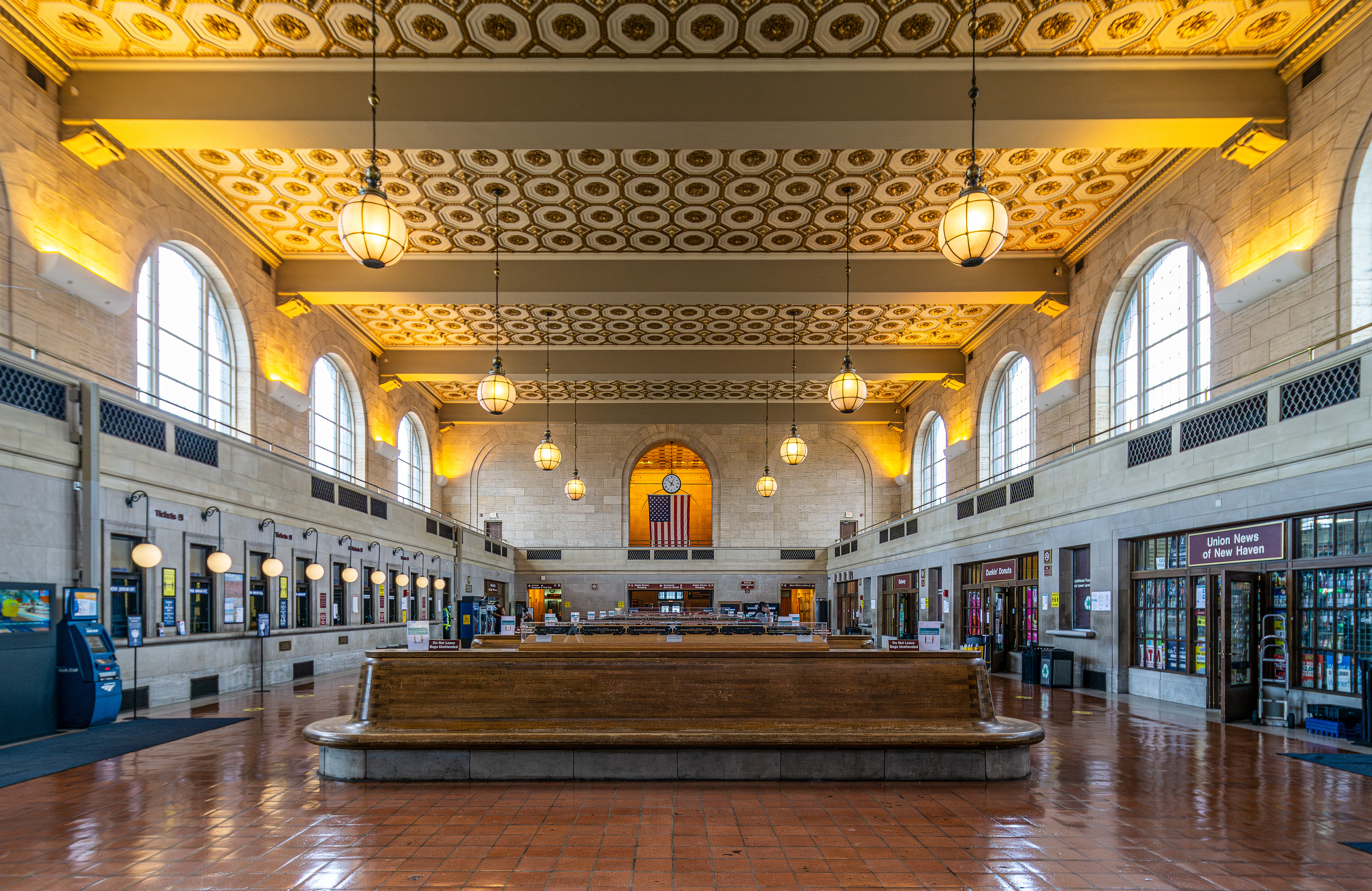
Main waiting area

The station has four high-level island platforms, which are used for service in both directions. The New Haven Line has nine tracks at the station. The northern platform is adjacent to Tracks 1 and 3 is usually served by Amtrak and can accommodate 8-car trains. The second platform from the north, adjacent to Tracks 2 and 4, is usually served by Amtrak and is 9 cars long. The second platform from the south is adjacent to Tracks 8 and 10, served by Metro-North, Shore Line East, and the Hartford Line, and can fit 7-car trains. The southern platform is adjacent to Tracks 12 and 14, usually serves Metro-North and Shore Line East, and can accommodate 8-car trains. Track 6, not adjacent to any platform in the center of the station, is used only by through trains or idling Shore Line East consists. There are no tracks 5, 7, 9, 11 and 13.

All tracks are connected by the stainless-steel tunnel with elevators and staircases leading onto the platforms, as well as escalators, a staircase, and an elevator leading to the tunnel itself. In 2015, LCD displays replaced a mechanical split-flap display departure board made by Solari di Udine. The split-flap display was donated to the Danbury Railway Museum in Danbury, Connecticut, to eventually be put on display.

On either side of the station, the Northeast Corridor merges into four tracks.

== Services ==
=== Amtrak ===
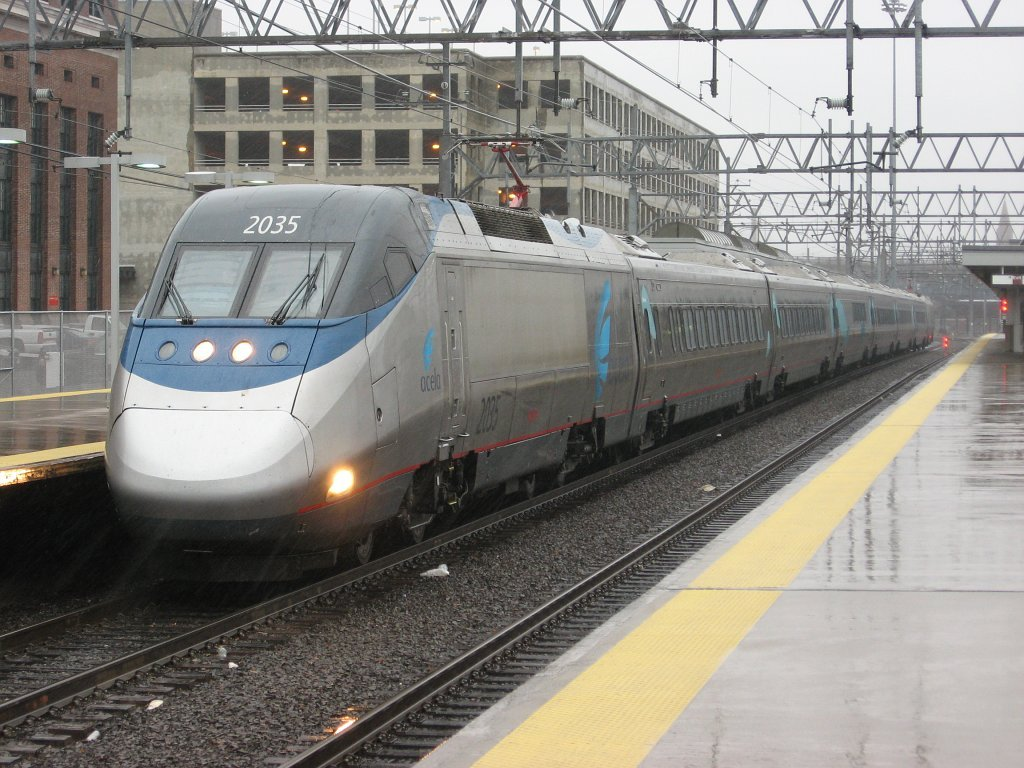
Acela Express at New Haven in 2007

Amtrak runs frequent service through Union Station along the electrified Northeast Corridor rail line. Most Amtrak trains are Northeast Regional trains or Acela trains operating between Washington, D.C., and Boston.

Hartford Line trains run to Springfield, Massachusetts via Hartford and Valley Flyer trains travel along the same route but continue on to Greenfield, Massachusetts. Some of these trains connect with Northeast Regional trains; other Northeast Regionals run through to Springfield from New York or vice versa. These through trains must change locomotives at New Haven, as the track north to Springfield is not electrified, unlike the Northeast Corridor. The locomotive change is from a Siemens ACS-64 for the electrified territory to a General Electric P40DC or P42DC for the non-electrified territory, or vice versa. Prior to 2000, when the Northeast Corridor was electrified all the way to Boston, all trains continuing north of Union Station had to change from diesel to electric power.

Additionally, the Vermonter provides through service from Washington, D.C., beyond Springfield to St. Albans, Vermont. At New Haven, the Vermonter also has a P42DC diesel-electric locomotive added to the train.

Amtrak operates a yard on the west side of the tracks, next to the station building.

Because of United Airlines code sharing on select Amtrak trains between Union Station and its hub at Newark Liberty International Airport in the New York City area, Union Station is assigned the IATA airport code of ZVE.

New Haven Union Station is the busiest Amtrak station in Connecticut. The station is the tenth busiest Amtrak station in the country, boarding or detraining nearly two thousand passengers daily.

In March 2020, Vermonter service north of the station was suspended indefinitely as part of a reduced service plan due to the coronavirus pandemic. The Vermonter resumed its normal service on July 19, 2021.

=== Metro-North ===
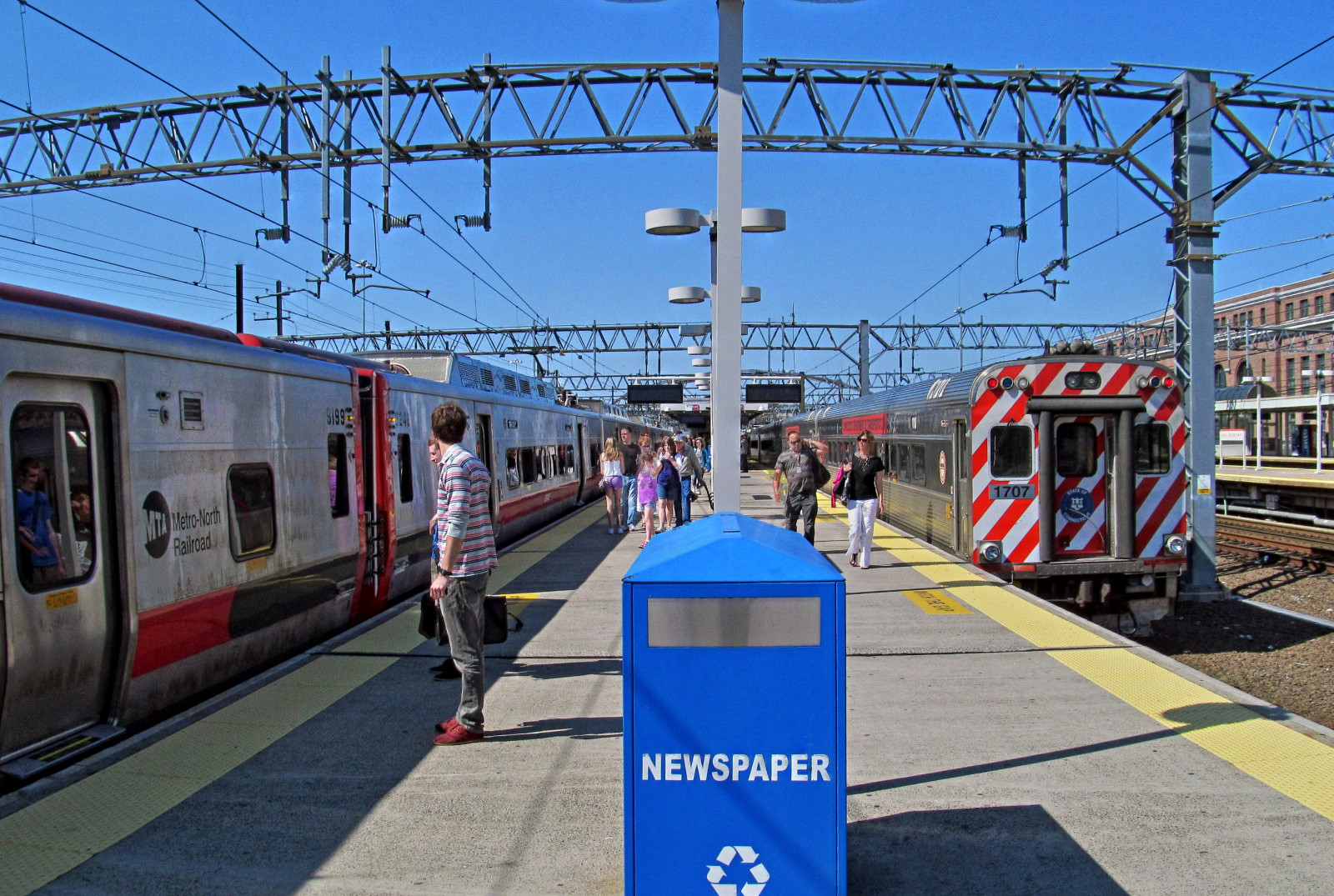
Cross-platform transfer between Metro-North (left) and Shore Line East trains at New Haven

Metro-North Railroad operates its New Haven Line from Union Station to Grand Central Terminal in New York City. The service is well patronized by commuters, despite the travel time of about two hours. Shore Line East and Metro-North work together on schedules to provide quick transfers of trains for commuters traveling from the Shoreline to Grand Central Terminal or Stamford.

Metro-North operates New Haven Yard on the east side of the tracks, opposite Amtrak's yard. Work is done here, as well as the storing of train cars and locomotives. Smaller yards are located in Bridgeport and Stamford.

A select number of trains start or end their run two minutes to the east at New Haven State Street.

=== CT Rail ===
Two rail services run by the Connecticut Department of Transportation under the CT Rail brand are based at New Haven. Shore Line East runs between New Haven and New London on the Northeast Corridor, with limited peak-hour service west of New Haven. The Hartford Line runs between New Haven and Springfield on the New Haven–Springfield Line. Service launched on June 16, 2018.

On April 20, 2020, the station became the indefinite western terminus for Shore Line East service, running on a limited schedule due to the coronavirus pandemic. Through service to Stamford resumed on October 7, 2024.

=== Buses and shuttles ===
CTtransit's New Haven Division provides bus service to the station on four routes. One is a free shuttle that connects Union Station to downtown and the New Haven Green for connections to the remainder of the CTTransit New Haven routes. Route 271 on the Kimberly Avenue route to Savin Rock and Milford also serves the station. Route 272 serves Union Station from downtown New Haven via South Church Street and returns to downtown New Haven. Route 278 is the Commuter Connection only on afternoon times connecting Shore Line East.

Other providers at Union Station are Greyhound, Megabus, Peter Pan, and the Yale University Shuttle.

== See also ==
- National Register of Historic Places listings in New Haven, Connecticut
