= Warehouse Point railroad bridge =

- A Valley Flyer train on the bridge in 2026
- Coordinates: 41.9435°N 72.6141°W
- Carries: Amtrak New Haven-Springfield Line
- Crosses: Connecticut River
- Locale: Enfield and Suffield, Hartford County, Connecticut

Characteristics
- Design: girder bridge with a truss main span

Rail characteristics
- No. of tracks: 1

History
- Construction end: 1866 (rebuilt 1903)

Location
- Interactive map of Warehouse Point railroad bridge

The Warehouse Point railroad bridge is a girder bridge with a truss main span crossing the Connecticut River between Enfield and Suffield, Connecticut. It carries Amtrak's New Haven–Springfield Line. The bridge has spaces for two tracks, but only one is connected to the mainline. It is one of a few iron bridges erected in the United States before the end of the American Civil War.

== History ==
A wooden Howe truss railroad bridge was originally constructed in 1843 at this site by the Hartford and Springfield Railroad Company. In 1865–66, a new bridge (designed by James Laurie) was constructed to replace the old one. The bridge was built in sections in England and shipped to the United States. The pieces were then riveted together on site. The bridge was rebuilt and double-tracked in 1903–04.

In mid-2023, Amtrak applied for a federal grant to replace the bridge. In November 2024, Amtrak was awarded $8 million for replacement planning.

== See also ==
- List of crossings of the Connecticut River
