= Stony Hill School =

Stony Hill School may refer to:

- Stony Hill School (Windsor, Connecticut), listed on the National Register of Historic Places in Hartford County, Connecticut
- Stony Hill School (Waubeka, Wisconsin), listed on the National Register of Historic Places in Ozaukee County, Wisconsin
