= William Shelton House =

Historic house in Connecticut, United States

- U.S. National Register of Historic Places
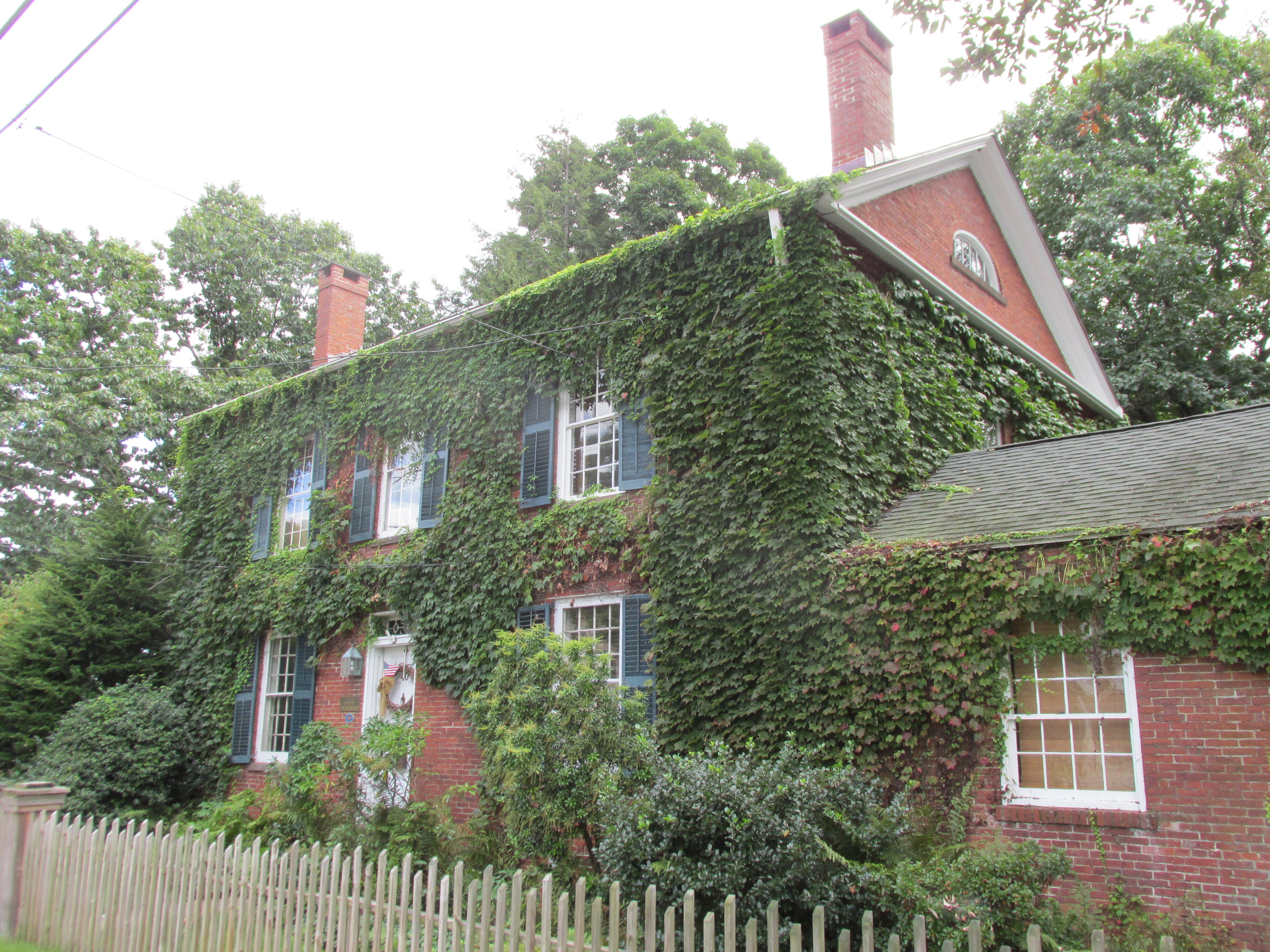

- Location within Connecticut Location within the United States
- Location: 40 Pleasant Street, Windsor, Connecticut
- Coordinates: 41°51′29″N 72°38′58″W
- Area: 1.1 acres (0.45 ha)
- Built: 1830
- Architectural style: Greek Revival, Federal
- MPS: 18th and 19th Century Brick Architecture of Windsor TR
- NRHP reference No.: 88001496
- Added to NRHP: September 15, 1988

The William Shelton House is a historic house at 40 Pleasant Street in Windsor, Connecticut. Built in 1830, it is a good local example of transitional Federal-Greek Revival architecture executed in brick. It was listed on the National Register of Historic Places in 1988.

== Description and history ==
The William Shelton House is located northwest of Windsor center, at the southwest corner of Pleasant and East Streets. It is a 2 1/2-story masonry structure, built out of red brick with stone trim. It is covered by a side gable roof, with two interior chimneys rising through the roof ridge. The main facade is three bays wide, with a center entrance topped by a transom window. The windows are set in rectangular openings, with cut stone sills and lintels. The side gables ends are pedimented, with half-round windows set in the gable. A single-story gabled brick ell extends to the right.

The house was built in 1830 by William Shelton. The bricks for its construction came from the brickyard of William Mack, which was located at the foot of Pleasant Street. This house is, along with the Daniel Payne House on Park Avenue, one of the town's best example of the transitional Federal-Greek Revival style. The half-round gable windows and transom are Federal in style, while the window treatments are Greek Revival.

== See also ==
- National Register of Historic Places listings in Windsor, Connecticut
