= House at 130 Hayden Station Road =

Historic house in Connecticut, United States

- U.S. National Register of Historic Places
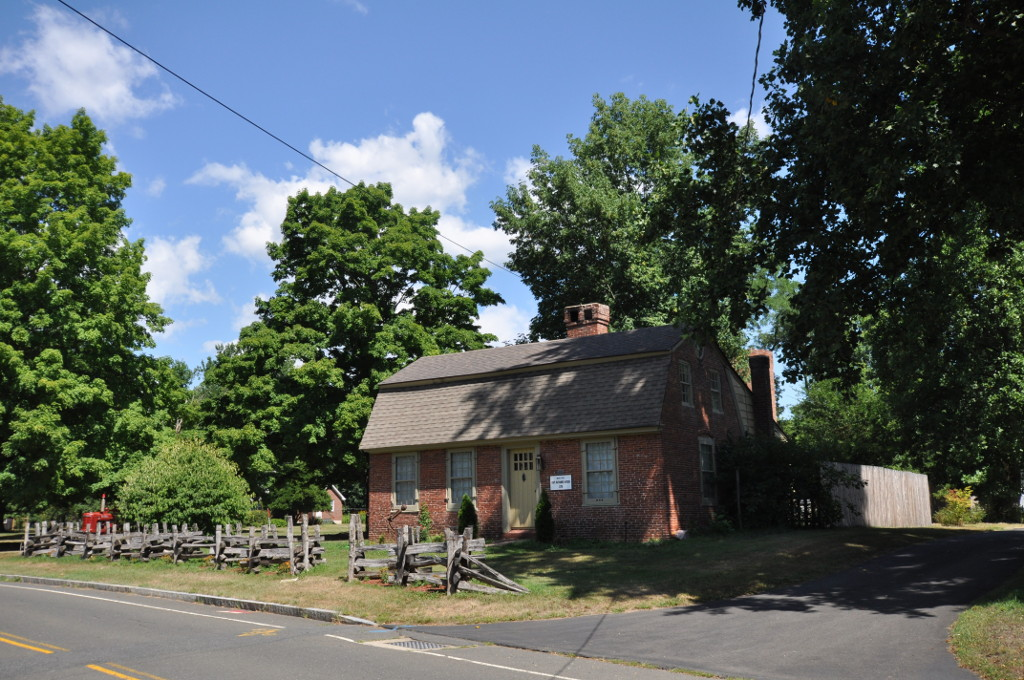

- Location within Connecticut Location within the United States
- Location: 130 Hayden Station Road, Windsor, Connecticut
- Coordinates: 41°53′32″N 72°37′55″W
- Area: 0.7 acres (0.28 ha)
- Built: 1760
- Architectural style: Georgian
- MPS: 18th and 19th Century Brick Architecture of Windsor TR
- NRHP reference No.: 88001484
- Added to NRHP: September 15, 1988

130 Hayden Station Road is an unusual Colonial-era brick cottage in Windsor, Connecticut. Built in 1760 next to the Capt. Nathaniel Hayden House, it was probably built as a shoemaker's shop. It was listed on the National Register of Historic Places in 1988.

== Description and history ==
130 Hayden Station Road is located in northern Windsor, close to the north side of Hayden Station Road, and is separated from Clapp Road South by the Capt. Nathaniel Hayden House, which stands adjacent. It is a 1 1/2-story gambrel-roofed brick structure, with a central chimney, and a shed-roof extension to the rear. The main facade is four bays wide, with the entrance in the center-right bay. Windows are rectangular sash, set in unadorned openings that butt against the eave.

The structure was probably built about 1760 by Nathaniel Hayden. Local historians have speculated that it served as a residence of the Hayden family prior to the construction of the larger house next door, but it is more likely that this was built as a shoemaking shop that the family is known to have run. It is an unusual surviving element of the town's colonial heritage.

== See also ==
- National Register of Historic Places listings in Windsor, Connecticut
