= Ira Loomis Jr. House =

Historic house in Connecticut, United States

- U.S. National Register of Historic Places
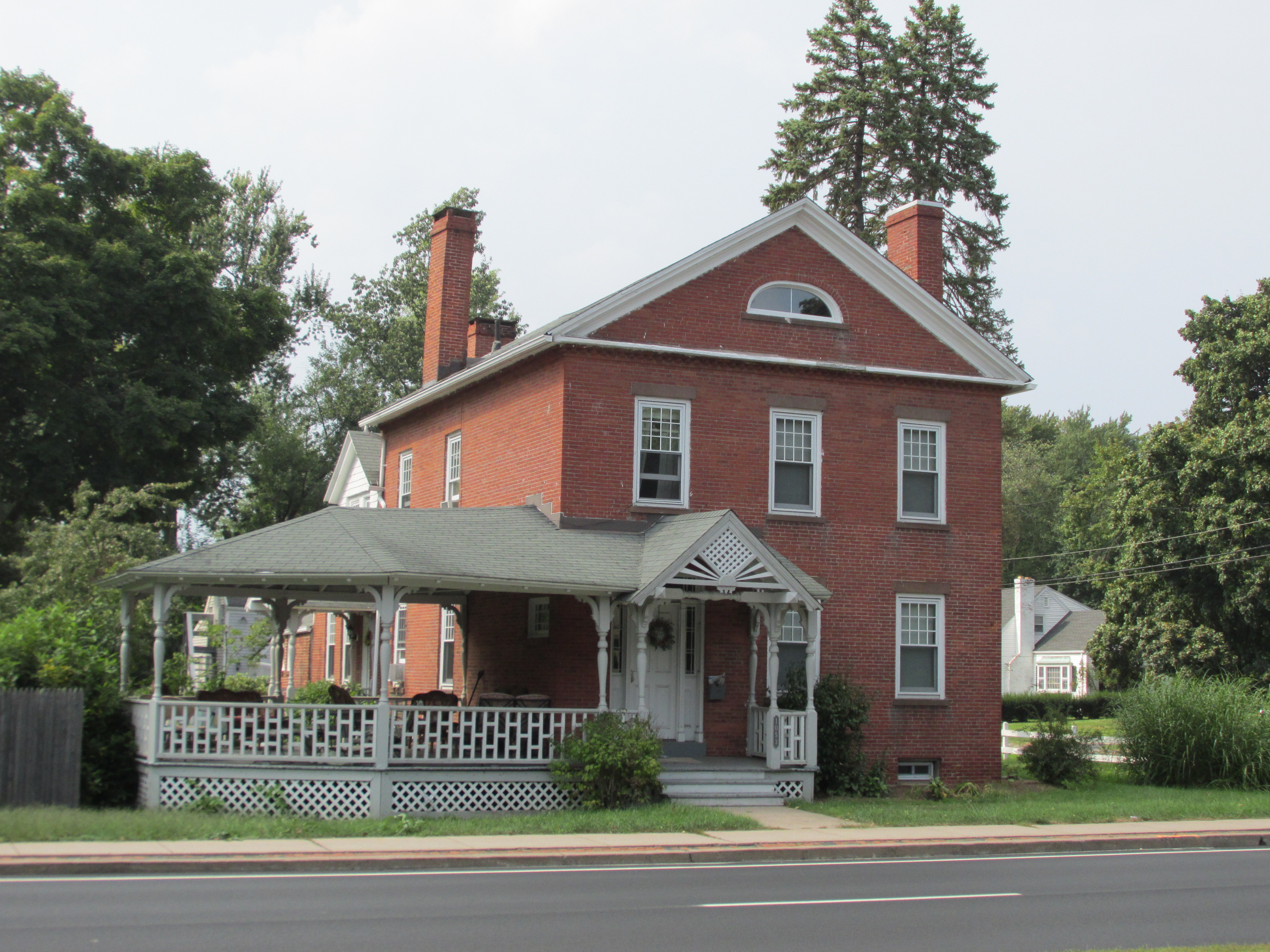

- Location within Connecticut Location within the United States
- Location: 1053 Windsor Avenue, Windsor, Connecticut
- Coordinates: 41°50′8″N 72°39′17″W
- Area: 0.7 acres (0.28 ha)
- Built: 1833
- Architectural style: Greek Revival, Federal
- MPS: 18th and 19th Century Brick Architecture of Windsor TR
- NRHP reference No.: 88001502
- Added to NRHP: September 15, 1988

The Ira Loomis Jr. House is a historic house at 1053 Windsor Avenue in Windsor, Connecticut. Built in 1833, it is a good local example of transitional Federal-Greek Revival architecture executed in brick. It was listed on the National Register of Historic Places in 1988.

== Description and history ==
The Ira Loomis Jr. House is located in southern Windsor, on the west side of Windsor Avenue, between Giddings Avenue and Ludlow Road. It is a 2 1/2-story brick structure, with a front-facing gabled roof. There are two brick chimneys remaining of four that were originally symmetrically placed. The main facade is three bays wide, with the main entrance in the leftmost bay, framed by sidelight and transom windows. That bay is sheltered by a Victorian-era porch that extends far beyond the building to the south, with turned posts and a gable with a lattice and fan motif. Windows are set in rectangular openings, with stone sills and lintels. The main gable is fully pedimented, with a Federal style fanlight at the center. A single-story brick ell extends to the rear of the building, with a gabled porch over a secondary entrance.

The house was built in 1833 for Ira Loomis Jr. by his father. Ira Loomis Sr. was a farmer and brickmaker, who also built a similar house nearby for his son Gordon.

== See also ==
- National Register of Historic Places listings in Windsor, Connecticut
