= Edward and Ann Moore House =

Historic house in Connecticut, United States

- U.S. National Register of Historic Places
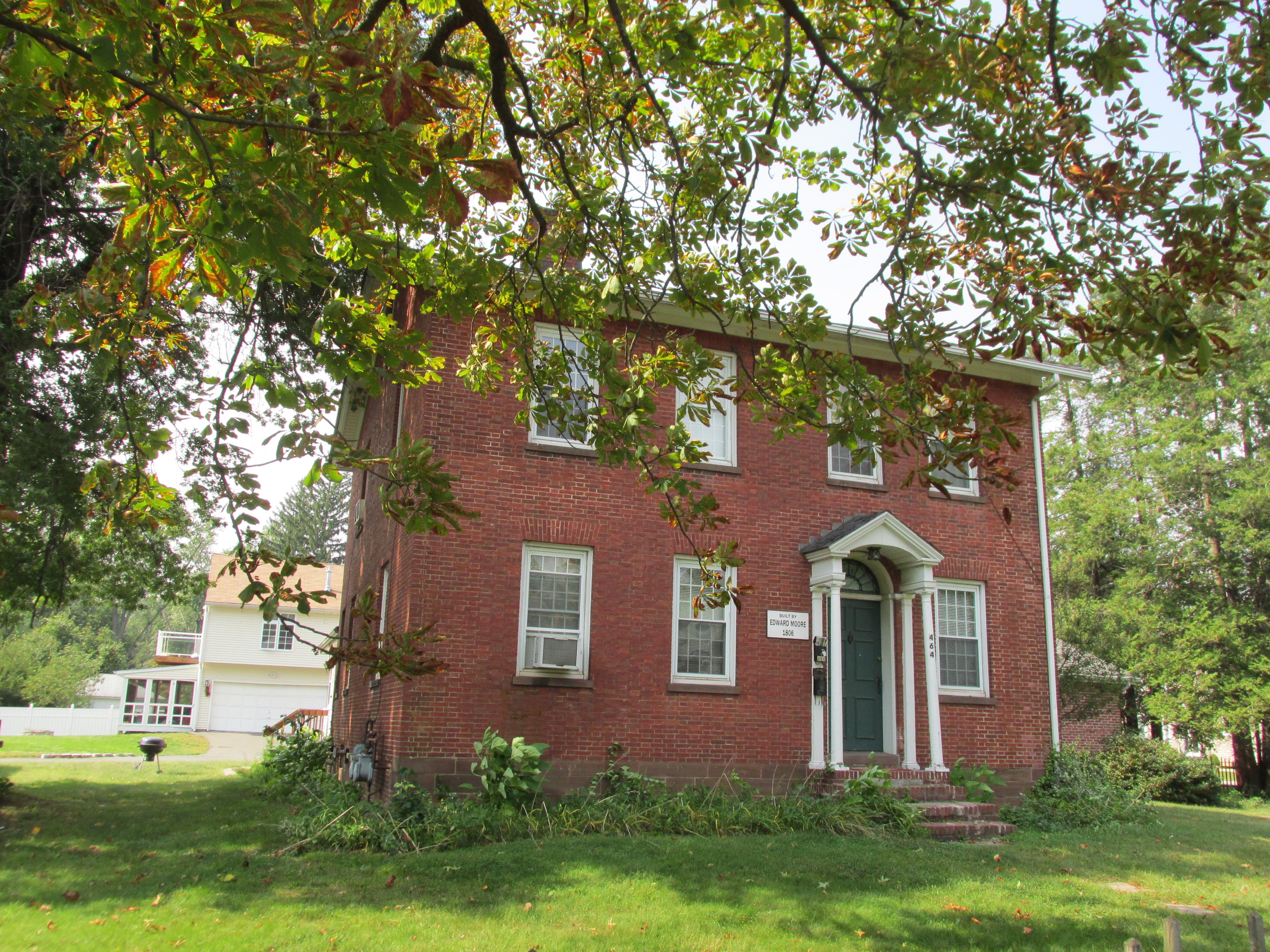

- Location within Connecticut Location within the United States
- Location: 464 Broad Street, Windsor, Connecticut
- Coordinates: 41°50′42″N 72°38′54″W
- Area: 0.3 acres (0.12 ha)
- Built: 1806
- Architectural style: Federal
- MPS: 18th and 19th Century Brick Architecture of Windsor TR
- NRHP reference No.: 88001478
- Added to NRHP: September 15, 1988

The Edward and Ann Moore House is a historic house at 464 Broad Street in Windsor, Connecticut. Built in 1806, it is a good example of Federal style residential architecture executed in brick. It was listed on the National Register of Historic Places in 1988.

== Description and history ==
The Edward and Ann Moore House is located a short way south of the village center of Windsor, at the southwest corner of Broad Street (Connecticut Route 159) and Capen Street. Broad Street is historically the major north–south route following the west bank of the Connecticut River. The house is a 2 1/2-story brick structure, with a side gable roof, granite foundation, and a single off-center interior chimney. (The chimney is one of two the house was built with.) The main facade faces Broad Street, and is four bays wide. The bays are place with irregularity, and the entrance is in the center-right bay, topped by a half-round transom window and sheltered by a gabled portico. Windows are set in rectangular openings, with stone lintels and headers of soldier bricks in a splayed layout. A single-story wood-frame addition extends back and right from the main block.

The house was built in 1806 by Edward Moore, and is one of the few well-preserved purely Federal style houses in the town. Most houses from that period were built with some variation from the academic forms, while this one exhibits the side gable roof, round entry transom, and window treatments that adhere to those norms. Later owners of the house include members of the Capen family.

== See also ==
- National Register of Historic Places listings in Windsor, Connecticut
