= John Fitch School =

- U.S. National Register of Historic Places
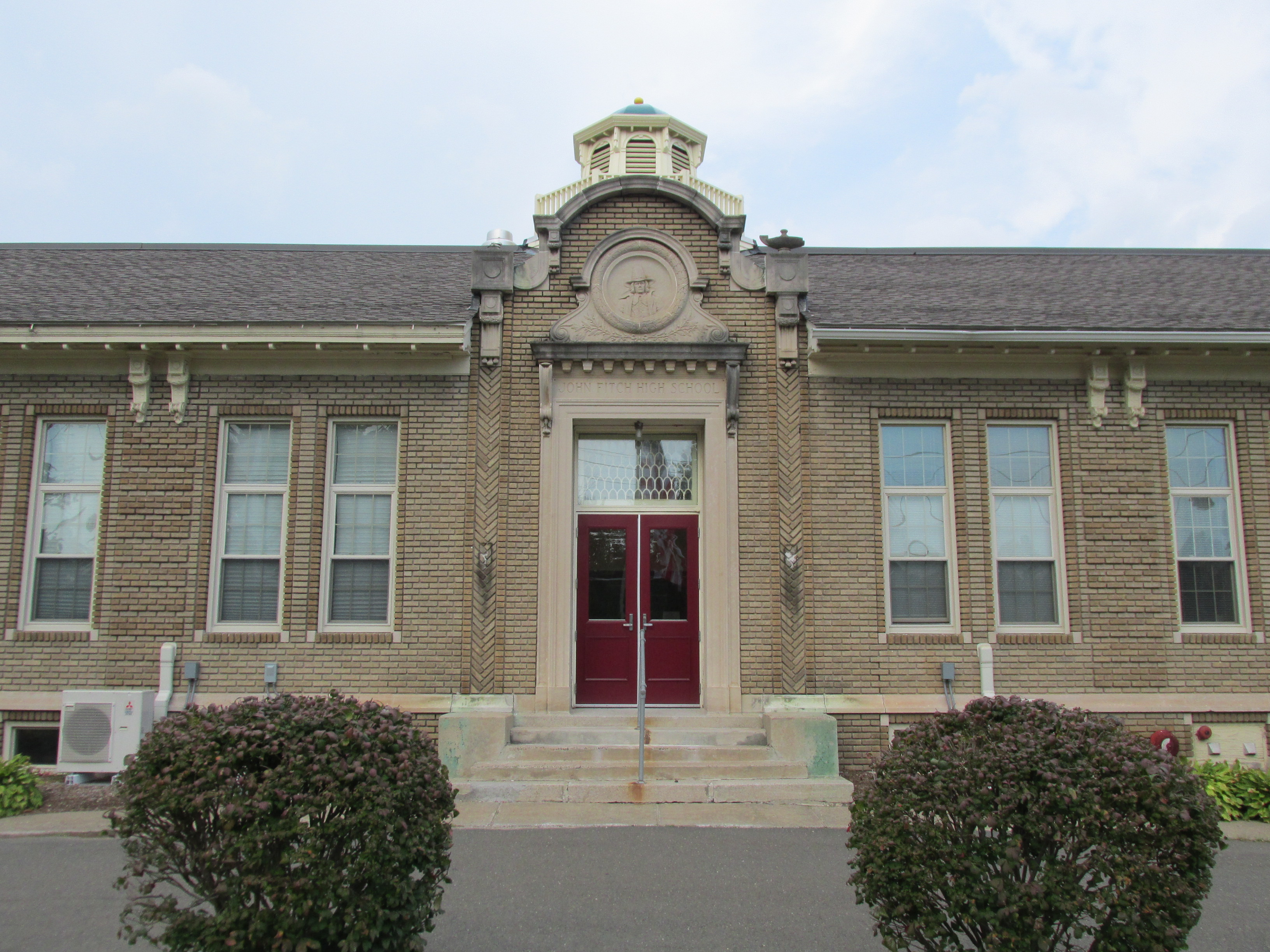

- Location within Connecticut Location within the United States
- Location: 156 Bloomfield Avenue, Windsor, Connecticut, United States
- Coordinates: 41°51′10″N 72°39′6″W
- Area: 7 acres (2.8 ha)
- Built: 1922
- Built by: Schwarz Bros.
- Architect: McClean, William Henry
- Architectural style: Beaux Arts
- NRHP reference No.: 86003326
- Added to NRHP: December 2, 1986

The John Fitch School is a historic former school building at 156 Bloomfield Avenue in Windsor, Connecticut, United States. Built in 1929 and twice enlarged, it is a prominent local example of the Beaux Arts style, and was the town's first purpose-built high school. Since 1988, it has served as Fitch Court, a senior housing complex managed by the local housing authority. It was listed on the National Register of Historic Places in 1986.

== Description and history ==
The former John Fitch School stands west of Windsor's village center, on the north side of Bloomfield Avenue (Connecticut Route 305), between Mack Street and Hayden Avenue. It is a complex of three constructions, consisting of the original main block and two large ells. All are single-story or 1-1/2 story masonry structures, built out of buff brick with stone trim. The main block was originally covered by a distinctive green tile roof; this has been replaced by asphalt architectural shingles. At its center is an octagonal cupola with green dome. The main entrance is set in a recess framed by bracketed hood and topped by a Flemish gable, in which a bas-relief of the school's namesake is set in a medallion. John Fitch was a local militia member who died in King Philip's War.

The school was built in 1921-22 to a design by William Henry McClean, an architect from Boston, Massachusetts. The school was an unusual departure from Connecticut schools of the period, which were typically Colonial Revival in style and built out of red brick. Its two enlargements, in 1929 and 1934, added classroom capacity. The school was readapted as a senior housing facility in 1988. The John Fitch school housed the Windsor Board of Education and rare programs that emerged from the leadership of Paul Sorbo Superintendent of Schools for Windsor. The rare art program in Windsor Schools was created by Menthe Wells who is a Museum Exhibiting Artist and who was on staff in the central office in the Windsor Board of Education for years in the 1960s launching the Art Program. She was on staff of the Wadsworth Atheneum Museum of Art where she created other public art projects. In Windsor, her office was located in the historic John Fitch School Building. She created the 40 foot public art Mural, City of the Future in the adjoining building on the Fitch site which was the Sidney Hayden Building. The 40 Foot Mural named City of the Future was a mosaic mural of thousands of pieces of handmade mosaics. The public art mural, paid for by Windsor Public Schools was housed in the John Fitch Auditorium for decades. Photos of The City of the Future were in the Hartford newspapers. Menthe organized participation of over 100 to participate in the individual pieces of mosaic that were used in the creation. Windsor was a leader in the development of art in the era. Paul Sorbo was the Superintendent of Schools and he personally supported the programs that Menthe launched for the school system.

== See also ==
- National Register of Historic Places listings in Windsor, Connecticut
