= Capt. James Loomis House =

Historic house in Connecticut, United States

- U.S. National Register of Historic Places
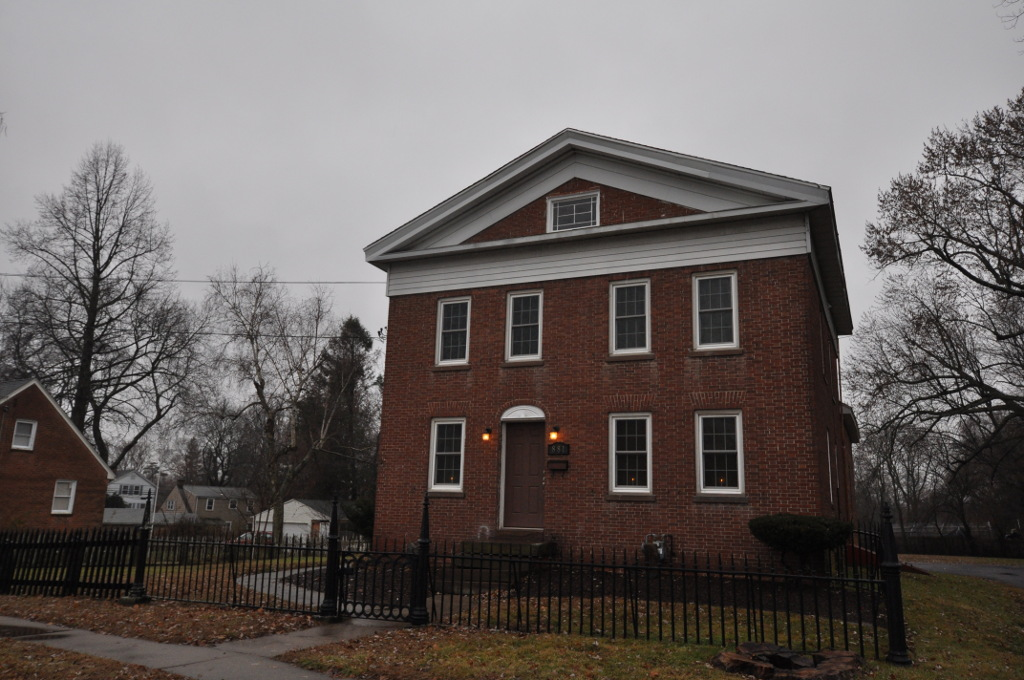

- Location within Connecticut Location within the United States
- Location: 881 Windsor Avenue, Windsor, Connecticut
- Coordinates: 41°49′47″N 72°39′24″W
- Area: 0.7 acres (0.28 ha)
- Built: 1825
- Architectural style: Greek Revival, Federal
- MPS: 18th and 19th Century Brick Architecture of Windsor TR
- NRHP reference No.: 88001499
- Added to NRHP: September 15, 1988

The Capt. James Loomis House is a historic house at 881 Windsor Avenue in Windsor, Connecticut. Built about 1825, it is a good local example of transitional Federal-Greek Revival architecture executed in brick. The house was listed on the National Register of Historic Places on September 15, 1988.

== Description and history ==
The Captain James Loomis House is located south of the village center of Windsor, on the west side of Windsor Street (Connecticut Route 159), the major north–south route through that part of the town, between Rood Avenue and Woody Brook Road. It is a 2 1/2-story brick structure, laid in Flemish bond throughout. It is four bays wide and two deep, with a boxed cornice and wide frieze. The main entrance is off-center on the front facade, with a semi-elliptical transom window above. The windows are otherwise symmetrically placed, with cut stone sills and lintels. In the gable end at the attic level is a window exhibiting Gothic tracery. A single-story ell extends the building to the rear.

The house was built about 1828 for Captain James Loomis, whose family was locally important, with numerous houses in the immediate area. This house exhibits a locally distinctive combination of Federal and Greek Revival features, the latter including the wide frieze and pedimented gable, and the former the elliptical fanlight.

== See also ==
- National Register of Historic Places listings in Windsor, Connecticut
