= Deacon John Moore House =

Historic house in Connecticut, United States

- U.S. National Register of Historic Places
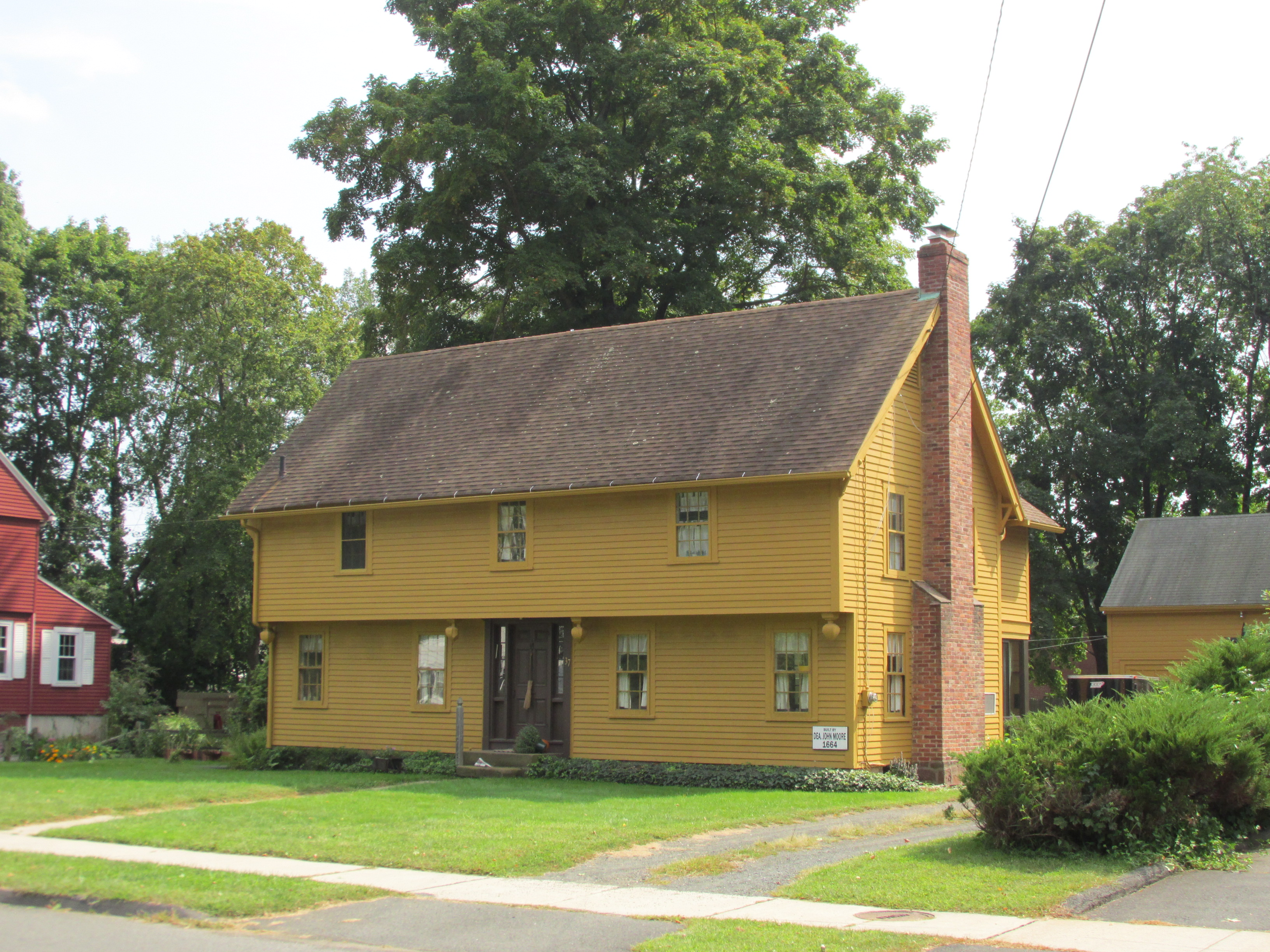
- Deacon John Moore House

- Location within Connecticut Location within the United States
- Location: 37 Elm Street, Windsor, Connecticut
- Coordinates: 41°51′1″N 72°38′46″W
- Area: less than one acre
- Built: 1664
- NRHP reference No.: 77001416
- Added to NRHP: August 29, 1977

The Deacon John Moore House is a historic house at 37 Elm Street in Windsor, Connecticut. The oldest portion of the house was built in 1664, making it one of the oldest houses in the state. It has been altered and renovated, but retains its original frame and other elements. It was listed on the National Register of Historic Places in 1977.

== Description ==
The Deacon John Moore House stands just outside the village center of Windsor, on the south side of Elm Street roughly midway between Broad Street and Spring Street. It is a 2 1/2-story timber-frame structure, with a steeply pitched gable roof and clapboarded exterior. The second story projects beyond the first in the colonial garrison style. The ground floor is five bays across, with two sash windows on either side of the center entrance. The entrance, a modern replacement, is flanked by sidelight windows. The second floor is three bays across, with equally spaced sash windows.

The house was built about 1664, and originally stood facing the Windsor Green at the corner of Broad and Elm Streets. It was probably moved once around 1805, and again to its present location in 1897. At that time it retained its eastern-facing orientation; it was rotated in 1938 to face the street.

== History ==
John and Thomas Moore were born in England and moved to Windsor, Connecticut. They arrived on the ship Mary and John and landed in Dorchester, Massachusetts in 1630 with ministers John Maverick and John Warham. In 1635, part of the group moved to Windsor, but the Moores remained in Dorchester until 1639.

John Moore was ordained a deacon in 1651. He was made deputy governor of Connecticut under John Winthrop the Younger. Moore had one son named John Moore Jr, and four daughters: Elizabeth Moore (married Nathaniel Loomis); Abagail Moore (married Thomas Bissell); Mindwell Moore (married Nathaniel Bissell); and Hannah Moore (married John Drake Jr.).

John Moore was also a successful woodworker. He is known for using the foliated vine design, which depicts vines and blossoms carved in shallow relief with flat surfaces. There was a network of families in Windsor who dominated the woodworking trade, and John Moore was considered to be at the center.

== See also ==
- List of the oldest buildings in Connecticut
- National Register of Historic Places listings in Windsor, Connecticut
