= House at 736 Palisado Avenue =

Historic house in Connecticut, United States

- U.S. National Register of Historic Places
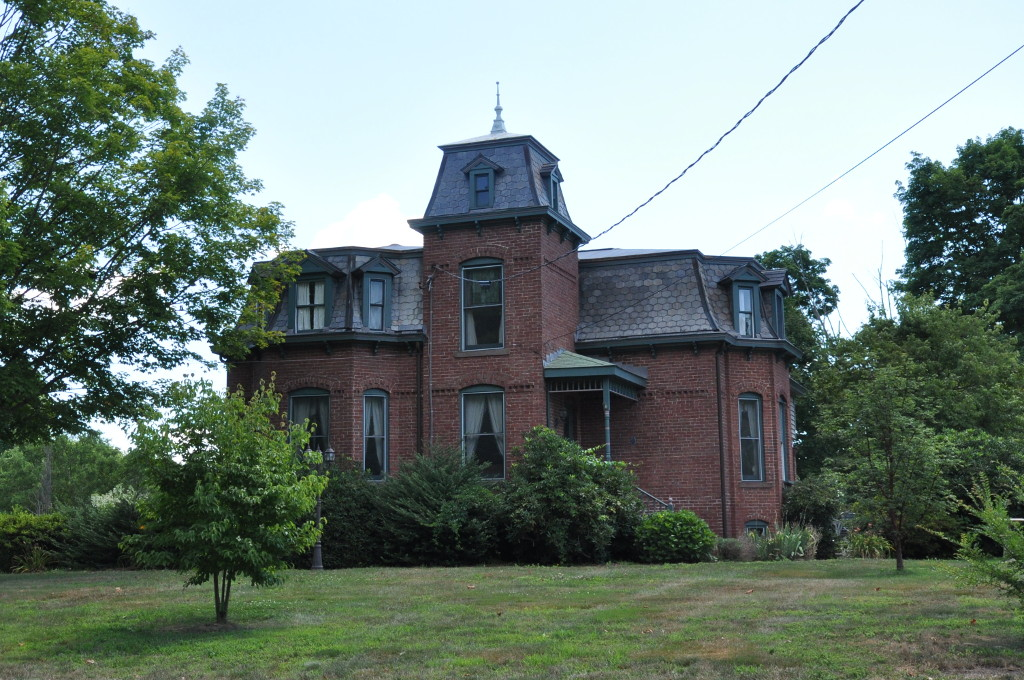

- Location within Connecticut Location within the United States
- Interactive map of House at 736 Palisado Avenue
- Location: 736 Palisado Avenue, Windsor, Connecticut
- Coordinates: 41°52′37″N 72°37′32″W
- Area: 0.8 acres (0.32 ha)
- Built: 1865
- Architectural style: Second Empire
- MPS: 18th and 19th Century Brick Architecture of Windsor TR
- NRHP reference No.: 88001494
- Added to NRHP: September 15, 1988

736 Palisado Avenue is one of a small number of Second Empire houses in Windsor, Connecticut. Built about 1865, it is a distinctive surviving example of the style in brick, with a mansard roof and turret. It was listed on the National Register of Historic Places in 1988.

== Description and history ==
Palisado Avenue, designated Connecticut Route 159, is the principal north–south route through Windsor, roughly paralleling the Connecticut River which forms the town's eastern border. Number 736 is on the east side of the road, a short way south of the Oliver Ellsworth Homestead, on a property that extends all the way to the river. It is a 2 1/2-story brick structure, with a flared mansard roof providing a full third story in the attic space. It is asymmetrical in shape, with a prominent 2 1/2-story turret at the center of its front facade. Windows are generally set in segmented-arch windows, with gabled dormers in the steeply sloping sections of the roof. The main entry is in the right side of the tower, sheltered by a hip-roofed porch with turned post and spindled valance.

The house was built about 1865, and is one of three examples of the Second Empire style in the town. Its more elaborate form is a significant contrast to the surrounding houses, many of which date to the 18th and early 19th centuries.

Homeowners have included Dr. Bill & Clotean Brayfield, A Connecticut Educator and Civil Rights Activist, the Amy Winnegar Family, Dr. Michael W. Klemens of the Connecticut Siting Council appointed by Governor Dannal Malloy and Chairman of Salisbury CT P & Z, and Honorable Judge Kevin Washington, Federal Govt and State and Town Human Rights and Social Justice Activist that still lives in the Town of Windsor.

== See also ==
- National Register of Historic Places listings in Windsor, Connecticut
