= William H. Harvey House =

Historic house in Connecticut, United States

- U.S. National Register of Historic Places
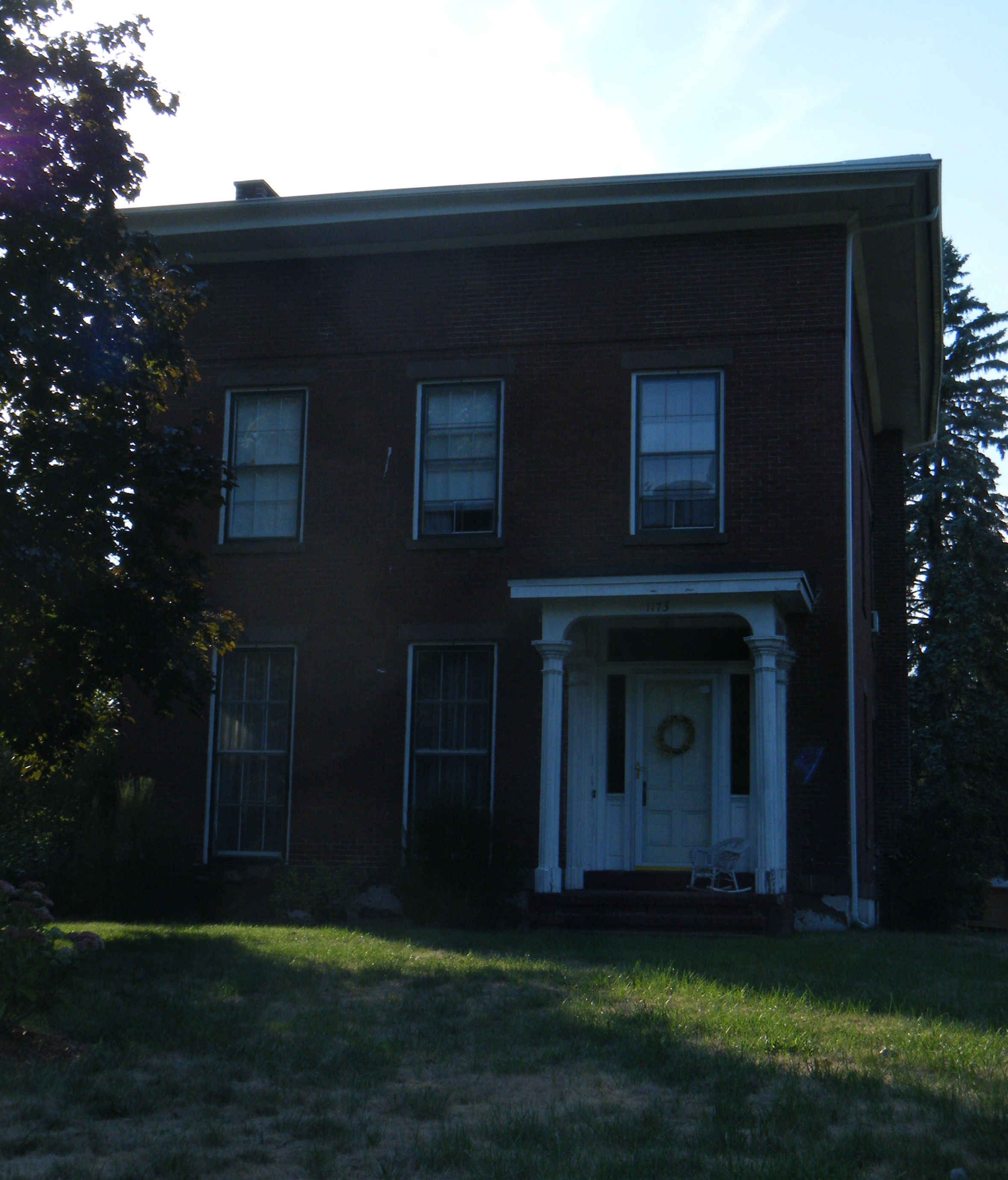

- Location within Connecticut Location within the United States
- Location: 1173 Windsor Avenue, Windsor, Connecticut
- Coordinates: 41°50′23″N 72°39′7″W
- Area: 0.4 acres (0.16 ha)
- Built: 1868
- Architectural style: Italianate
- MPS: 18th and 19th Century Brick Architecture of Windsor TR
- NRHP reference No.: 88001503
- Added to NRHP: September 15, 1988

The William Harvey House is a historic house at 1173 Windor Avenue in Windsor, Connecticut. Built in 1868, it is a good local example of Italianate architecture, executed in brick. It was listed on the National Register of Historic Places in 1988.

== Description and history ==
The William Harvey House stands in southern Windsor, at the northwest corner of Windsor Avenue (Connecticut Route 189) and Hillcrest Road. Windsor Avenue is at this point the major north–south thoroughfare on the west side of the Connecticut River. The house is two stories in height, with a flat roof and brick walls. The eaves of the roof are elongated, projecting a significant distance beyond the walls. The front facade is three bays wide, with the main entrance in the rightmost bay. It is sheltered by flat-roof portico, and has sidelight and transom windows, with flanking pilasters. The ground floor windows are elongated, and the second-floor windows are of a more typical sash size, with sills and lintels of brownstone. On the side elevations there are small windows in the attic level. A two-story brick ell extends to the rear of the main block.

The house was built about 1868 for William Harvey, a local tobacco merchant, and was in the family until at least the mid-20th century. The house is one a modest number of surviving Italianate homes in the town.

== See also ==
- National Register of Historic Places listings in Windsor, Connecticut
