= Capt. Benjamin Allyn II House =

Historic house in Connecticut, United States

- U.S. National Register of Historic Places
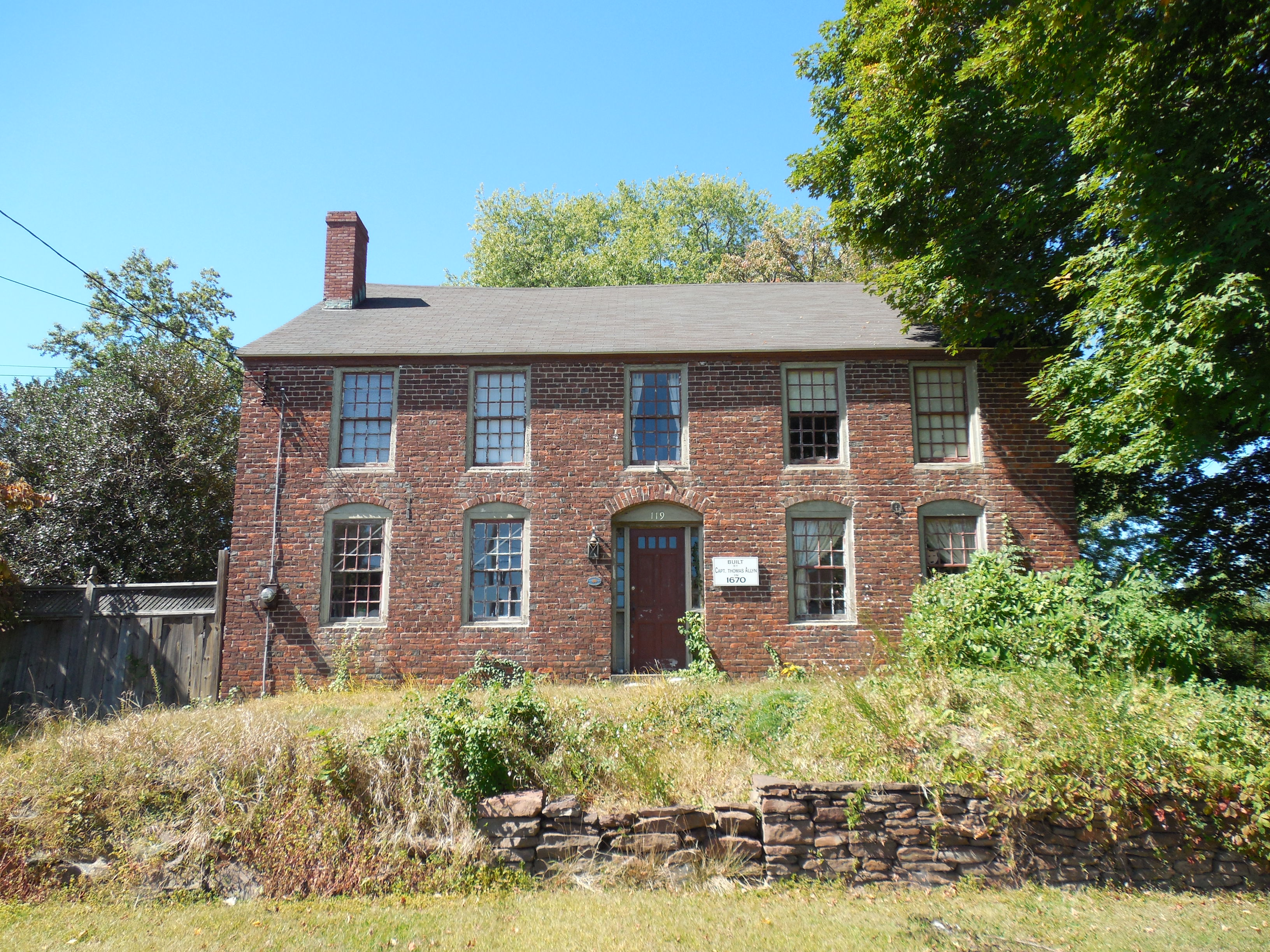

- Location within Connecticut Location within the United States
- Location: 119 Deerfield Road, Windsor, Connecticut
- Coordinates: 41°49′13″N 72°39′11″W
- Area: less than one acre
- Built: 1760
- MPS: 18th and 19th Century Brick Architecture of Windsor TR (AD)
- NRHP reference No.: 79002633
- Added to NRHP: June 26, 1979

The Captain Benjamin Allyn II House, also known locally as the Thomas Allyn House, is a historic house at 119 Deerfield Road in Windsor, Connecticut. Built in the mid-18th century or possibly earlier, it is a well-preserved example of a Colonial era brick house. It was listed on the National Register of Historic Places in 1979.

== Description and history ==
The Allyn House stands on the west side of Deerfield Road, historically the main road along the west bank of the Connecticut River, in southern Windsor. It is 2 1/2 stories in height, with a side gable roof. Its walls are built out of brick laid in common bond, with differing shapes indicating different periods of construction. Ground-floor openings in the five-bay facade have segmented-arch headers, with the entrance at the center, while second-floor windows are in rectangular openings butting against the eave. The interior has a center-hall plan, with parlors on either side and a kitchen and small extra chamber in the rear. Period woodwork is found in each of these rooms, and floors are wide pine.

The house's construction date is traditionally given as 1670, based on a partial carving (of which only the "1" and "0" survive legibly) on its main beams. It is possible that the house was built at this early date, but a date of 1760 is also plausible. Documentary records for the property are unclear whether this house or another was standing at the earlier date. The house was originally built as a saltbox, and was only raised to have a full second floor at a later date, evidenced by changes in the brick used. Even with a 1760 construction date, this house stylistically prefigures the later Federal period brick houses that are more numerous in Windsor.

== See also ==
- National Register of Historic Places listings in Windsor, Connecticut
