= National Register of Historic Places listings in Windsor, Connecticut =

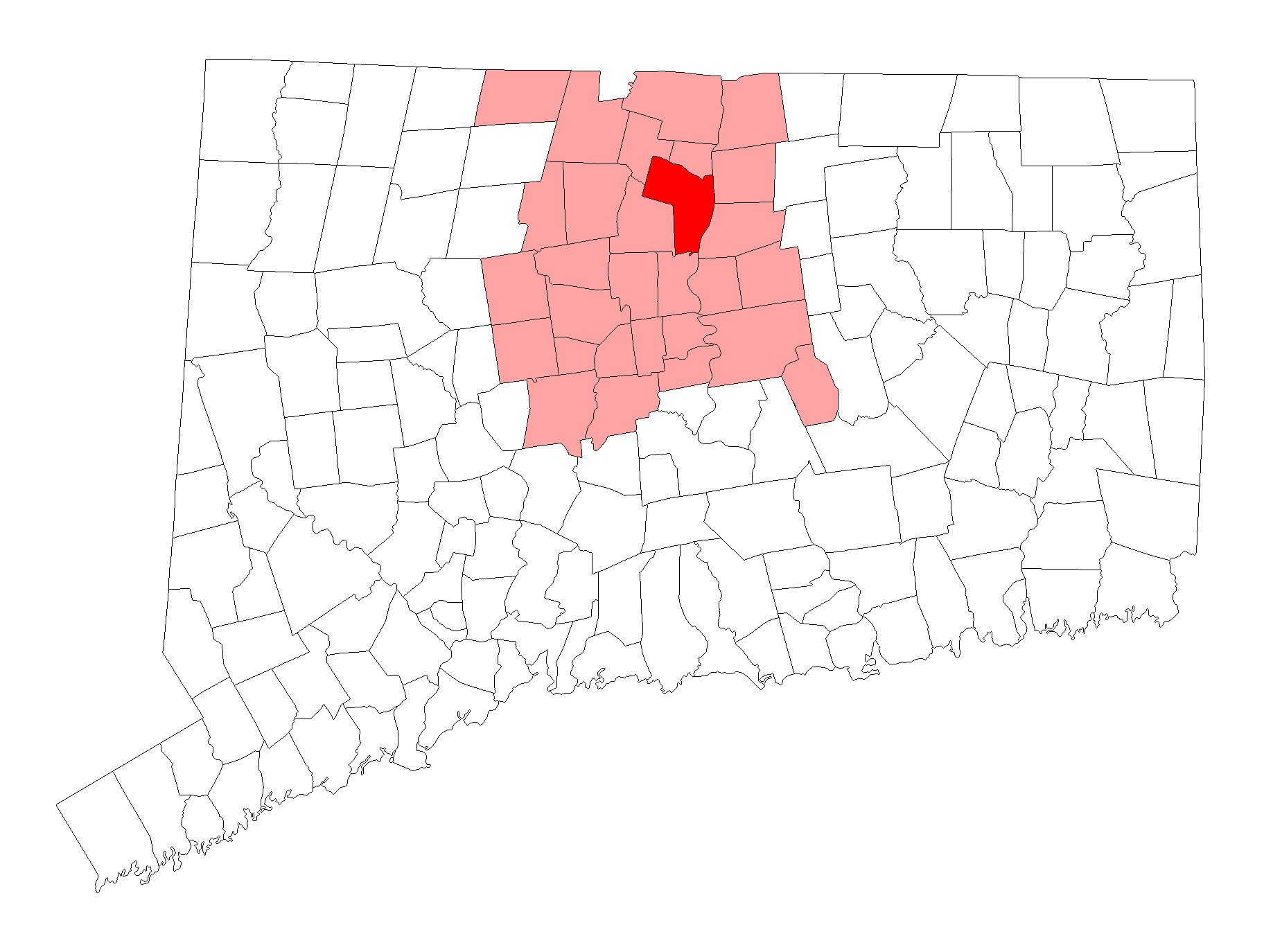
Location of Windsor in Connecticut

This is a list of the National Register of Historic Places listings in Windsor, Connecticut.

This is intended to be a complete list of the properties and districts on the National Register of Historic Places in Windsor, Connecticut, United States. The locations of National Register properties and districts for which the latitude and longitude coordinates are included below, may be seen in various online maps.

There are more than 400 properties and districts listed on the National Register in Hartford County, including 21 National Historic Landmarks. The 41 properties and districts located in the town of Windsor include one National Historic Landmark and are listed below. The properties and districts in the remaining parts of the county are listed separately.

Contents: Counties and municipalities in Connecticut

Fairfield (city of Bridgeport | town of Greenwich | city of Stamford) | Hartford (city of Hartford | town of Southington | town of West Hartford | town of Windsor) | Litchfield | Middlesex (city of Middletown) | New Haven (city of New Haven) | New London | Tolland | Windham

This National Park Service list is complete through NPS recent listings posted October 30, 2026.

== Current listings ==
| | Name on the Register | Image | Date listed | Location | City or town | Description |
|---|---|---|---|---|---|---|
| 1 | Capt. Benjamin Allyn II House | Capt. Benjamin Allyn II House | June 26, 1979 (#79002633) | 119 Deerfield Road; 41°49′13″N 72°39′11″W | | |
| 2 | Giles Barber House | Giles Barber House | September 15, 1988 (#88001498) | 411-413 Windsor Avenue; 41°48′53″N 72°39′29″W | | |
| 3 | Bissell Tavern-Bissell's Stage House | Bissell Tavern-Bissell's Stage House | August 23, 1985 (#85001825) | 1022 Palisado Avenue; 41°53′12″N 72°37′38″W | | |
| 4 | Broad Street Green Historic District | Broad Street Green Historic District | December 30, 1999 (#99001613) | Roughly along Broad Street from Batchelder Road to Union Street; 41°51′01″N 72°38′33″W | | |
| 5 | Benomi Case House | Benomi Case House | September 15, 1988 (#88001497) | 436 Rainbow Road; 41°55′05″N 72°41′35″W | | |
| 6 | Hezekiah Chaffee House | Hezekiah Chaffee House | July 31, 1972 (#72001336) | 108 Palisado Avenue; 41°51′28″N 72°38′11″W | | |
| 7 | Taylor Chapman House | Taylor Chapman House | September 15, 1988 (#88001492) | 407 Palisado Avenue; 41°51′59″N 72°37′49″W | | |
| 8 | Horace H. Ellsworth House | Horace H. Ellsworth House | September 15, 1988 (#88001489) | 316 Palisado Avenue; 41°51′49″N 72°37′53″W | | |
| 9 | Oliver Ellsworth Homestead | Oliver Ellsworth Homestead | October 6, 1970 (#70000707) | 778 Palisado Avenue; 41°52′40″N 72°37′31″W | | Home of the third Chief Justice of the United States |
| 10 | Farmington River Railroad Bridge | Farmington River Railroad Bridge | August 25, 1972 (#72001334) | Spans the Farmington River and Pleasant Street West of Palisado Avenue; 41°51′28″N 72°38′30″W | | |
| 11 | First Church Parsonage | First Church Parsonage | September 15, 1988 (#88001488) | 160 Palisado Avenue; 41°51′34″N 72°38′06″W | | |
| 12 | John Fitch School | John Fitch School | December 2, 1986 (#86003326) | 156 Bloomfield Avenue; 41°51′10″N 72°39′06″W | | |
| 13 | Former Fire Station | Former Fire Station | September 15, 1988 (#88001485) | 14 Maple Avenue; 41°51′05″N 72°38′44″W | | |
| 14 | Grace Church Rectory | Grace Church Rectory | September 15, 1988 (#88001477) | 301 Broad Street; 41°50′59″N 72°38′37″W | | |
| 15 | Hartford & New Haven Railroad Depot | Hartford & New Haven Railroad Depot | September 15, 1988 (#88001479) | 41 Central Street; 41°51′08″N 72°38′34″W | | |
| 16 | Hartford & New Haven Railroad-Freight Depot | Hartford & New Haven Railroad-Freight Depot | September 15, 1988 (#88001505) | 40 Mechanic Street; 41°51′06″N 72°38′32″W | | |
| 17 | William H. Harvey House | William H. Harvey House | September 15, 1988 (#88001503) | 1173 Windsor Avenue; 41°50′23″N 72°39′07″W | | |
| 18 | Hathaways Store | Hathaways Store | September 15, 1988 (#88001482) | 32 East Street; 41°51′25″N 72°38′57″W | | |
| 19 | Capt. Nathaniel Hayden House | Capt. Nathaniel Hayden House | September 15, 1988 (#88001483) | 128 Hayden Station Road; 41°53′31″N 72°37′49″W | | |
| 20 | House at 111 Maple Avenue | House at 111 Maple Avenue | September 15, 1988 (#88001486) | 111 Maple Avenue; 41°51′04″N 72°38′59″W | | |
| 21 | House at 130 Hayden Station Road | House at 130 Hayden Station Road | September 15, 1988 (#88001484) | 130 Hayden Station Road; 41°53′32″N 72°37′55″W | | |
| 22 | House at 44 Court Street | House at 44 Court Street | September 15, 1988 (#88001480) | 44 Court Street; 41°51′07″N 72°38′48″W | | |
| 23 | House at 736 Palisado Avenue | House at 736 Palisado Avenue | September 15, 1988 (#88001494) | 736 Palisado Avenue; 41°52′37″N 72°37′32″W | | |
| 24 | Capt. James Loomis House | Capt. James Loomis House | September 15, 1988 (#88001499) | 881 Windsor Avenue; 41°49′47″N 72°39′24″W | | |
| 25 | Col. James Loomis House | Col. James Loomis House | September 15, 1988 (#88001476) | 208-210 Broad Street; 41°51′07″N 72°38′41″W | | |
| 26 | George G. Loomis House | George G. Loomis House | September 15, 1988 (#88001500) | 1003 Windsor Avenue; 41°50′03″N 72°39′18″W | | |
| 27 | Gordon Loomis House | Gordon Loomis House | September 15, 1988 (#88001501) | 1021 Windsor Avenue; 41°50′05″N 72°39′18″W | | |
| 28 | Ira Loomis, Jr. House | Ira Loomis, Jr. House | September 15, 1988 (#88001502) | 1053 Windsor Avenue; 41°50′08″N 72°39′17″W | | |
| 29 | Henry Magill House | Henry Magill House | September 15, 1988 (#88001491) | 390 Palisado Avenue; 41°51′57″N 72°37′48″W | | |
| 30 | Elijah Mills House | Elijah Mills House | August 23, 1985 (#85001829) | 45 Deerfield Road; 41°49′06″N 72°39′20″W | | |
| 31 | Oliver W. Mills House | Oliver W. Mills House | February 19, 1982 (#82004443) | 148 Deerfield Road; 41°49′16″N 72°39′09″W | | |
| 32 | Timothy Dwight Mills House | Timothy Dwight Mills House | September 15, 1988 (#88001481) | 184 Deerfield Road; 41°49′20″N 72°39′11″W | | |
| 33 | Deacon John Moore House | Deacon John Moore House | July 29, 1977 (#77001416) | 37 Elm Street; 41°51′01″N 72°38′46″W | | |
| 34 | Edward and Ann Moore House | Edward and Ann Moore House | September 15, 1988 (#88001478) | 464 Broad Street; 41°50′42″N 72°38′54″W | | |
| 35 | Patrick Murphy House | Patrick Murphy House | September 15, 1988 (#88001490) | 345 Palisado Avenue; 41°51′53″N 72°37′53″W | | |
| 36 | Palisado Avenue Historic District | Palisado Avenue Historic District | August 25, 1987 (#87000799) | Palisado Avenue (signed as Connecticut Route 159) between the Farmington River and Bissell Ferry Road; 41°51′35″N 72°38′10″W | | |
| 37 | Daniel Payne House | Daniel Payne House | September 15, 1988 (#88001495) | 27 Park Avenue; 41°50′20″N 72°39′14″W | | |
| 38 | Eli Phelps House | Eli Phelps House | September 15, 1988 (#88001487) | 18 Marshall Phelps Road; 41°53′23″N 72°40′33″W | | |
| 39 | William Shelton House | William Shelton House | September 15, 1988 (#88001496) | 40 Pleasant Street; 41°51′29″N 72°38′58″W | | |
| 40 | Stony Hill School | Stony Hill School | September 15, 1988 (#88001504) | 1195 Windsor Avenue; 41°50′25″N 72°39′04″W | | |
| 41 | Sophia Sweetland House | Sophia Sweetland House | September 15, 1988 (#88001493) | 458 Palisado Avenue; 41°52′04″N 72°37′45″W | | |

== See also ==
- List of National Historic Landmarks in Connecticut
- National Register of Historic Places listings in Connecticut
