= Giles Barber House =

Historic house in Connecticut, United States

- U.S. National Register of Historic Places
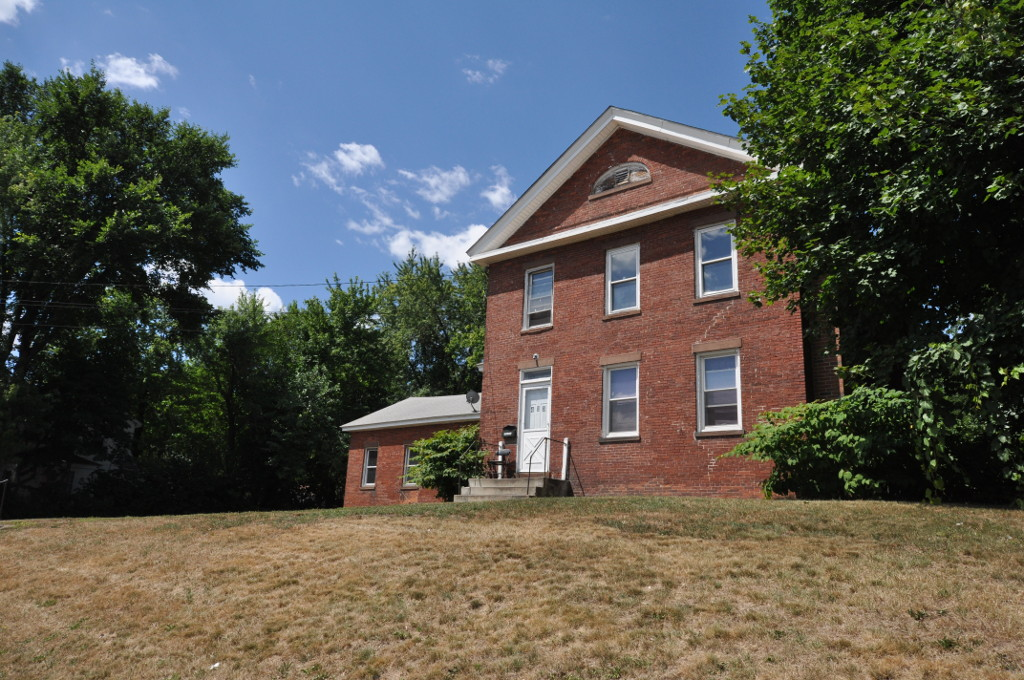

- Location within Connecticut Location within the United States
- Location: 411-413 Windsor Avenue, Windsor, Connecticut
- Coordinates: 41°48′53″N 72°39′29″W
- Area: 0.6 acres (0.24 ha)
- Built: 1825
- Architectural style: Greek Revival, Federal
- MPS: 18th and 19th Century Brick Architecture of Windsor TR
- NRHP reference No.: 88001498
- Added to NRHP: September 15, 1988

The Giles Barber House is a historic house at 411-413 Windsor Avenue in Windsor, Connecticut. Built about 1825, it is a well-preserved local example of a transitional Federal-Greek Revival brick house. It was listed on the National Register of Historic Places in 1988.

== Description and history ==
The Giles Barber House stands in southern Windsor, on the west side of Windsor Street (Connecticut Route 159), a major north–south roadway, between Barber and Allen Streets. It is a masonry structure, with a 2 1/2-story main block that is covered by front-facing gabled roof. Behind this is a two-story ell, from which a single-story ell extends to the left (south) from its rear. The main facade is three bays wide, with the entrance in the leftmost bay. Windows are set in rectangular openings with brownstone lintels and sills. The gable above is fully pedimented, with a Federal style semi-oval window at its center.

The house was built about 1825 by Giles Barber, using bricks made from brickyards the operated on the other side of Windsor Avenue. The L-shaped plan is typical of the early Greek Revival, but its simpler styling and pediment window are more typical of the Federal period. This house is one of a number of early 19th-century brick houses to survive in southern Windsor.

== See also ==
- National Register of Historic Places listings in Windsor, Connecticut
