= George G. Loomis House =

Historic house in Connecticut, United States

- U.S. National Register of Historic Places
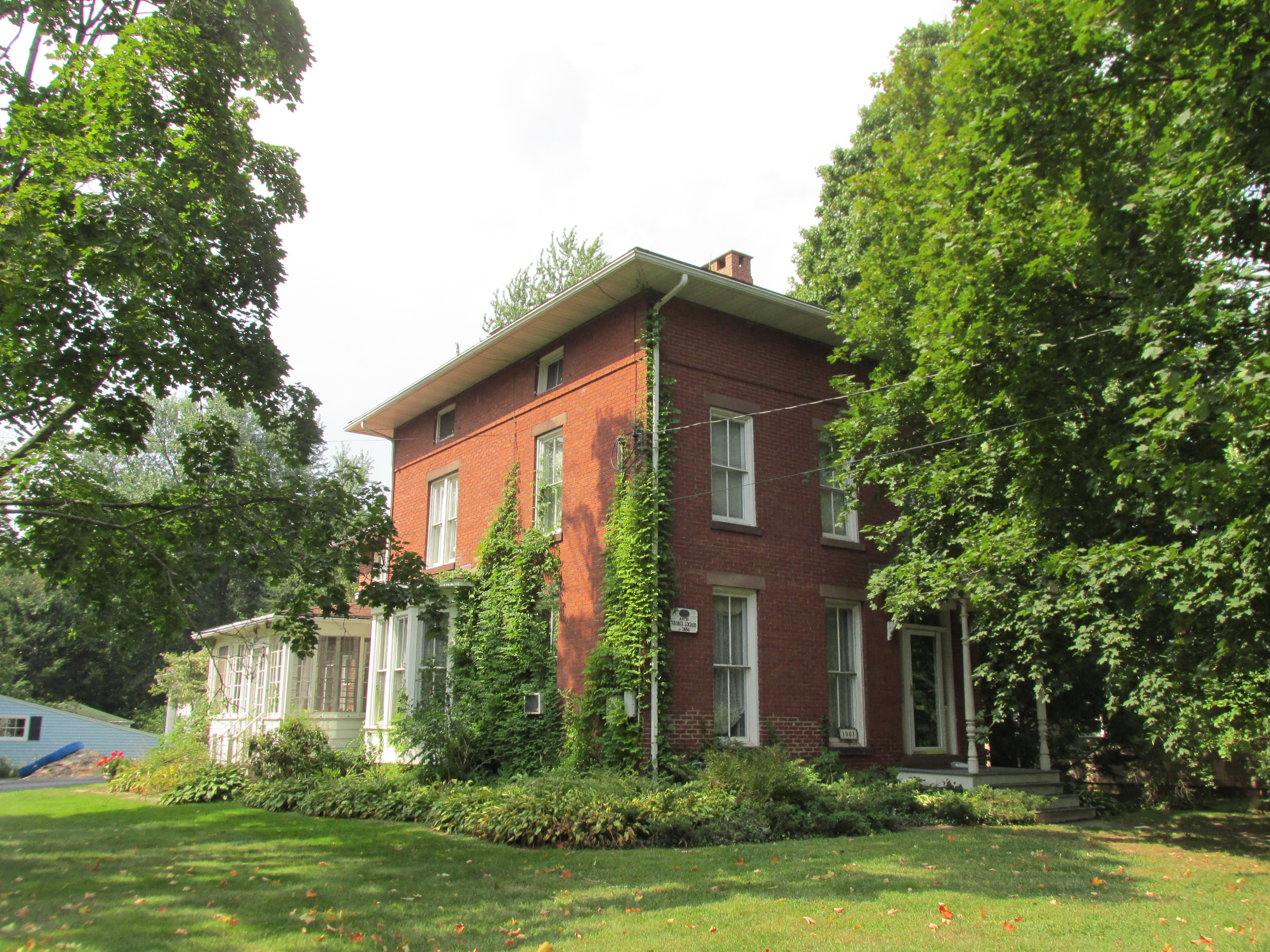

- Location within Connecticut Location within the United States
- Location: 1003 Windsor Avenue, Windsor, Connecticut
- Coordinates: 41°50′3″N 72°39′18″W
- Area: 0.4 acres (0.16 ha)
- Built: 1856
- Architectural style: Greek Revival, Italianate
- MPS: 18th and 19th Century Brick Architecture of Windsor TR
- NRHP reference No.: 88001500
- Added to NRHP: September 15, 1988

The George G. Loomis House is a historic house at 1003 Windsor Avenue in Windsor, Connecticut. Built about 1856, it is a good local example of transitional Greek Revival-Italianate architecture executed in brick. It was listed on the National Register of Historic Places in 1988.

== Description and history ==
The George G. Loomis House stands in Southern Windsor, on the West Side of Windsor Avenue (Connecticut Route 159) at its junction with Giddings Avenue. Windsor Avenue is the area's major north–south route through town, and Giddings Avenue is residential. The house is two stories in height, with a flat roof and brick walls. It is three bays wide and two deep, with the main entrance in the rightmost front bay, sheltered by a small portico with turned posts. Windows are set in rectangular openings with stone sills and lintels; the first-floor front windows are elongated in the Greek Revival style. On the sides, there are small windows at the attic level, and a projecting window bay occupies one bay on the left side. A two-story ell extends to the rear, with an enclosed porch attached to its south side.

The house was built in 1856 for George Gilbert Loomis, and is a good example of the transition between the Greek Revival and Italianate. Loomis was a farmer who served in the Union Army during the American Civil War.

== See also ==
- National Register of Historic Places listings in Windsor, Connecticut
