= Sophia Sweetland House =

Historic house in Connecticut, United States

- U.S. National Register of Historic Places
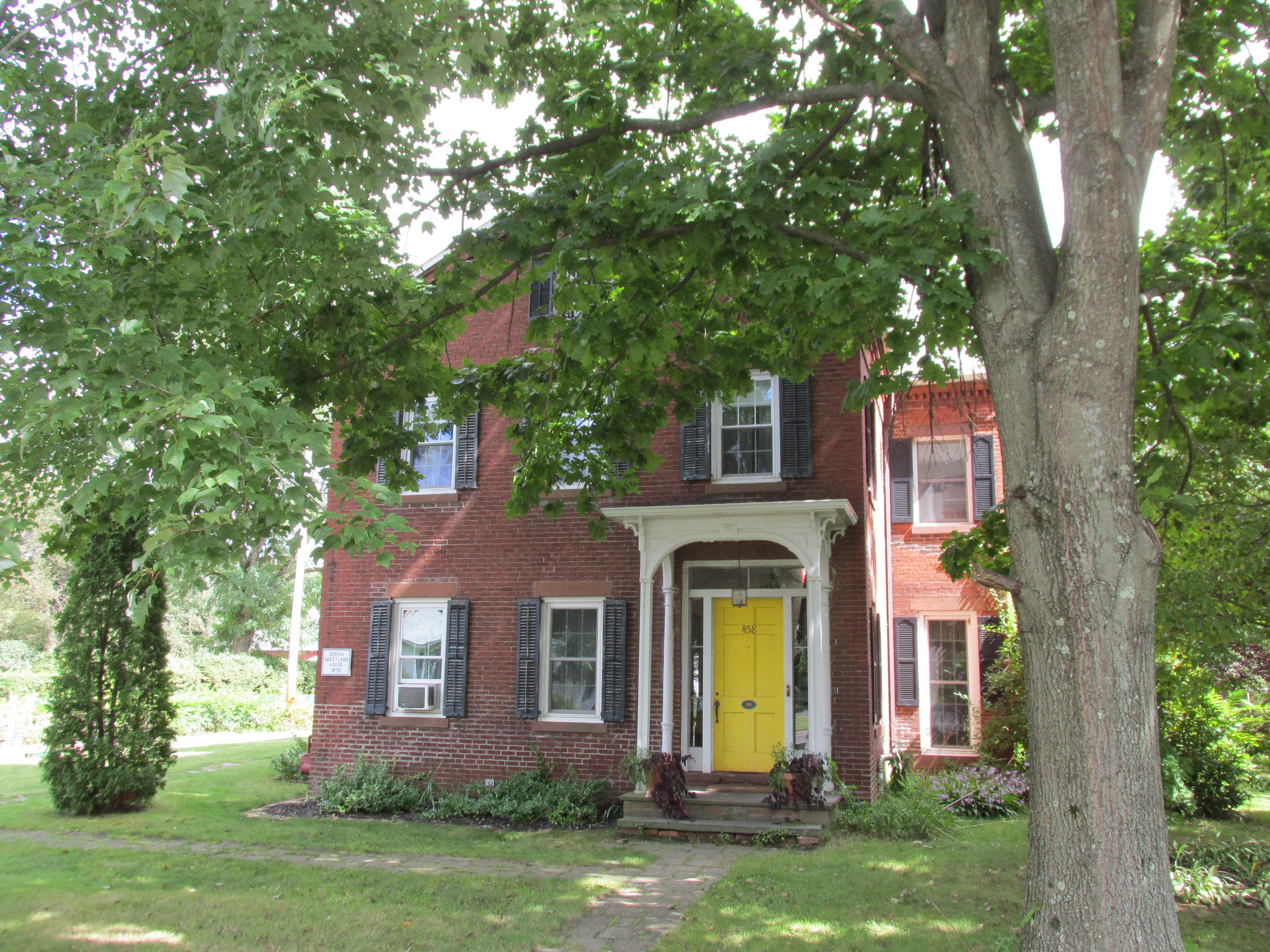

- Location within Connecticut Location within the United States
- Interactive map showing the location of Sweetland House
- Location: 458 Palisado Avenue, Windsor, Connecticut
- Nearest city: Hartford, Connecticut
- Coordinates: 41°52′4″N 72°37′45″W
- Area: 0.3 acres (0.12 ha)
- Built: 1845
- Architectural style: Italianate
- MPS: 18th and 19th Century Brick Architecture of Windsor TR
- NRHP reference No.: 88001493
- Added to NRHP: September 15, 1988

The Sophia Sweetland House is a historic house at 458 Palisado Avenue in Windsor, Connecticut. Built about 1845, it is a good local example of transitional Greek Revival-Italianate architecture executed in brick. It was listed on the National Register of Historic Places in 1988.

== Description and history ==
The Sophia Sweetland House stands in northern Windsor, on the east side of Palisado Avenue (Connecticut Route 159) a short way north of its junction with Bissell Ferry Road. It is a 2 1/2-story brick structure, with a front-facing gabled roof. The main facade is three bays wide, with the entrance in the right bay, framed by sidelight and transom windows. It is sheltered by a porch with slender columns and brackets that form arched openings, and has a low-pitch roof with extended eaves supported by decoratively cut brackets. Windows are generally set in rectangular openings, with brownstone sills and lintels. The exception is the front gable window, which is set in a round-arch opening. Two-story sections project from either side, with a corbelled cornice running below the roof line.

The house was built about 1845 by Isaac Sweetland, a farmer who lived here with his wife Sophia. The house's Greek Revival features include the roof gable orientation and window treatments, while the Italianate is represented in the entrance porch and gable window.

== See also ==
- National Register of Historic Places listings in Windsor, Connecticut
