= First Church Parsonage (Windsor, Connecticut) =

Historic house in Connecticut, United States

- U.S. National Register of Historic Places
- U.S. Historic district – Contributing property
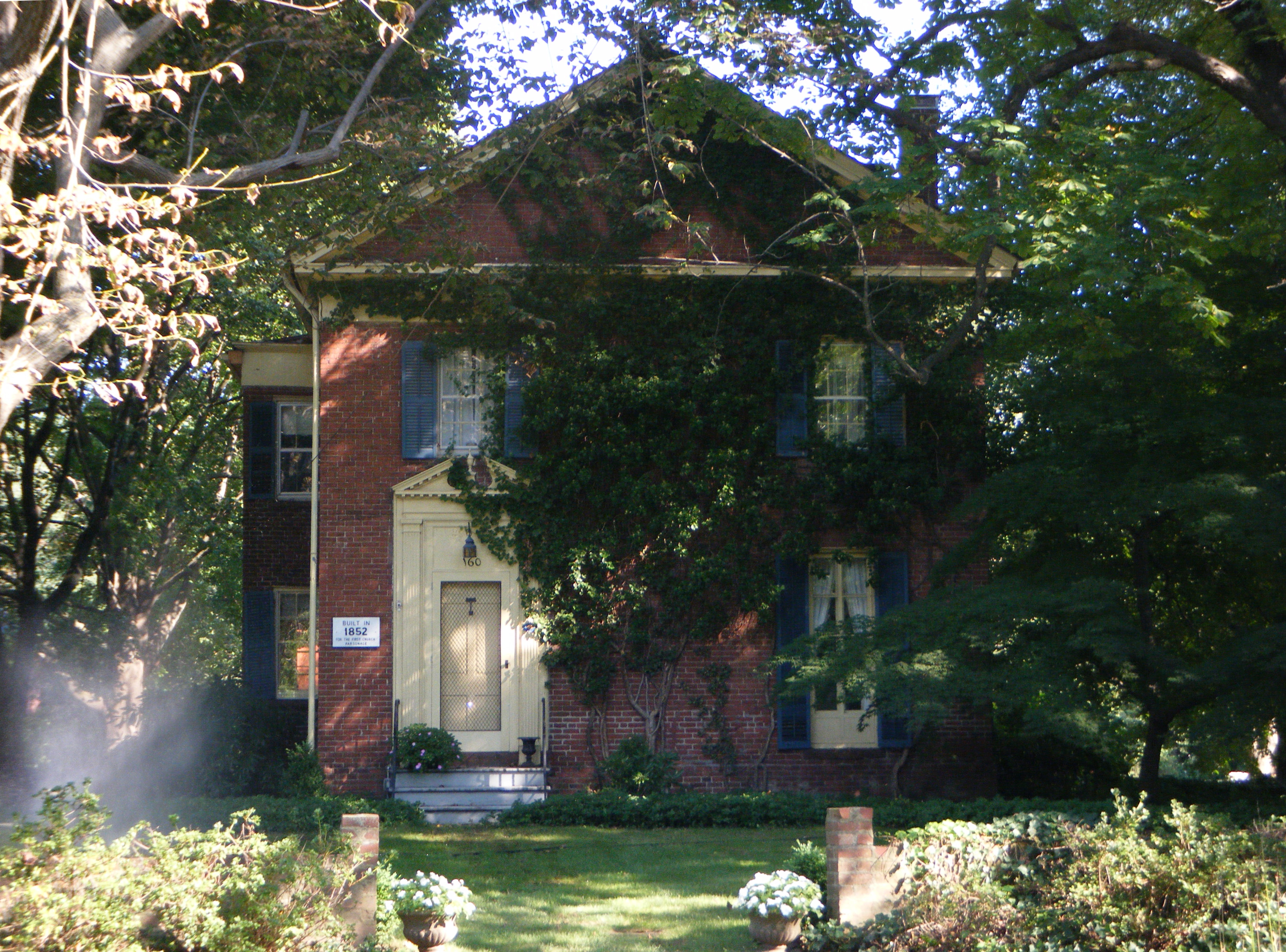

- Location within Connecticut Location within the United States
- Location: 160 Palisado Avenue, Windsor, Connecticut
- Coordinates: 41°51′34″N 72°38′6″W
- Area: 1.1 acres (0.45 ha)
- Built: 1852
- Architectural style: Greek Revival
- Part of: Palisado Avenue Historic District (ID87000799)
- MPS: 18th and 19th Century Brick Architecture of Windsor TR
- NRHP reference No.: 88001488

Significant dates
- Added to NRHP: September 15, 1988
- Designated CP: August 25, 1987

The First Church Parsonage is a historic parsonage house at 160 Palisado Avenue in Windsor, Connecticut. Built in 1852 for the new minister of the First Congregational Church, it is a well-preserved example of transitional Greek Revival-Italianate architecture in brick. The house was listed on the National Register of Historic Places in 1988.

== Description and history ==
The former First Church Parsonage stands a short way north of Windsor's Palisado Green, on the east side of Palisado Avenue (Connecticut Route 159). It is a 2 1/2-story brick structure, three bays wide, with a front-facing gable roof. A full entablature extends around the sides and front of the house, just below the roof line, and forming an enclosed pediment in the gable end. The main entrance, set in the leftmost bay, is sheltered by an early 20th-century Colonial Revival portico. The ground-floor front windows on the west and south sides are tall French-style windows. The property includes a 19th-century barn.

The house was built in 1852 by the First Congregational Church for the Reverend Leete, whose service began that year. It was the first church-funded parsonage for the congregation. It is a good local example of transitional Greek Revival-Italianate styling. It was originally adorned with an elaborate Italianate front porch.

== See also ==
- National Register of Historic Places listings in Windsor, Connecticut
