= House at 44 Court Street =

Historic house in Connecticut, United States

- U.S. National Register of Historic Places
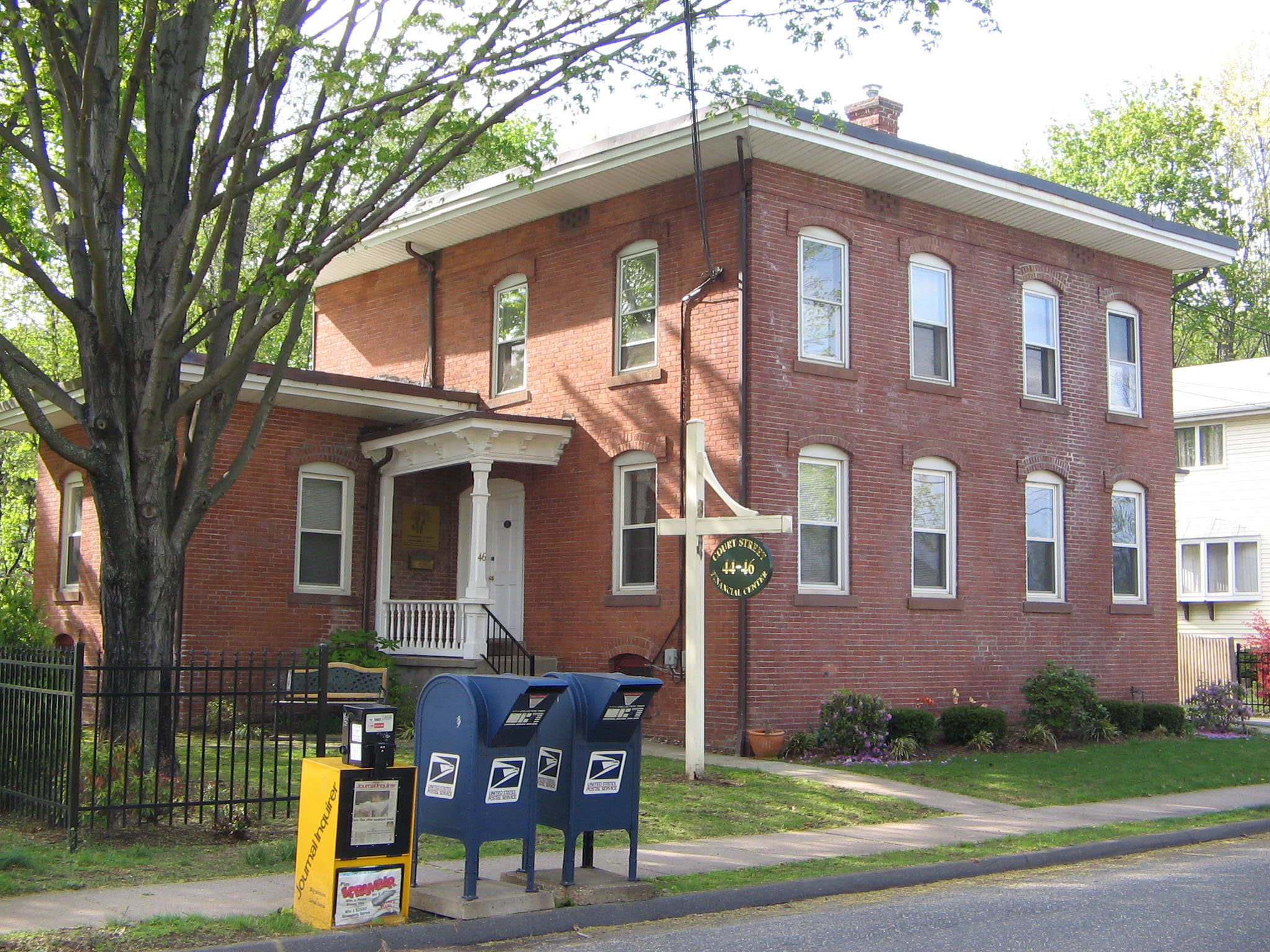
- House at 44 Court Street in Windsor, CT

- Location within Connecticut Location within the United States
- Location: 44 Court Street, Windsor, Connecticut
- Coordinates: 41°51′7″N 72°38′48″W
- Area: 0.2 acres (0.081 ha)
- Built: 1873
- Architectural style: Italianate
- MPS: 18th and 19th Century Brick Architecture of Windsor TR
- NRHP reference No.: 88001480
- Added to NRHP: September 15, 1988

44 Court Street in Windsor, Connecticut is a well-preserved Italianate brick duplex. Built in 1876, it is one a few buildings of this type left in the town. It was listed on the National Register of Historic Places. It is currently the home of Court Street Financial Services.

== Description and history ==
Court Street is a short one-block predominantly residential street paralleling Broad Street, the main street through the center of Windsor. Number 44 is on the west side of the street. It is a two-story structure, four bays wide, with a low-pitch hip roof with deep overhanging eaves. A two-story ell projects from the north side; a single-story one from the south. The entrances to the separate units are on the north and south sides, sheltered by small porches with chamfered square posts and Italianate brackets in the eaves. Windows are set in segmented-arch openings, with brick headers and brownstone sills; the entrances are also in segmented-arch openings.

The duplex was built c. 1874 for H. Sidney Hayden, a local developer, as a rental property. Hayden was responsible for doing a significant amount of residential construction in and around the town center. He bequeathed the property to his sister when he died.

== See also ==
- National Register of Historic Places listings in Windsor, Connecticut
