= Hathaways Store =

Historic commercial building in Windsor, Connecticut

- U.S. National Register of Historic Places
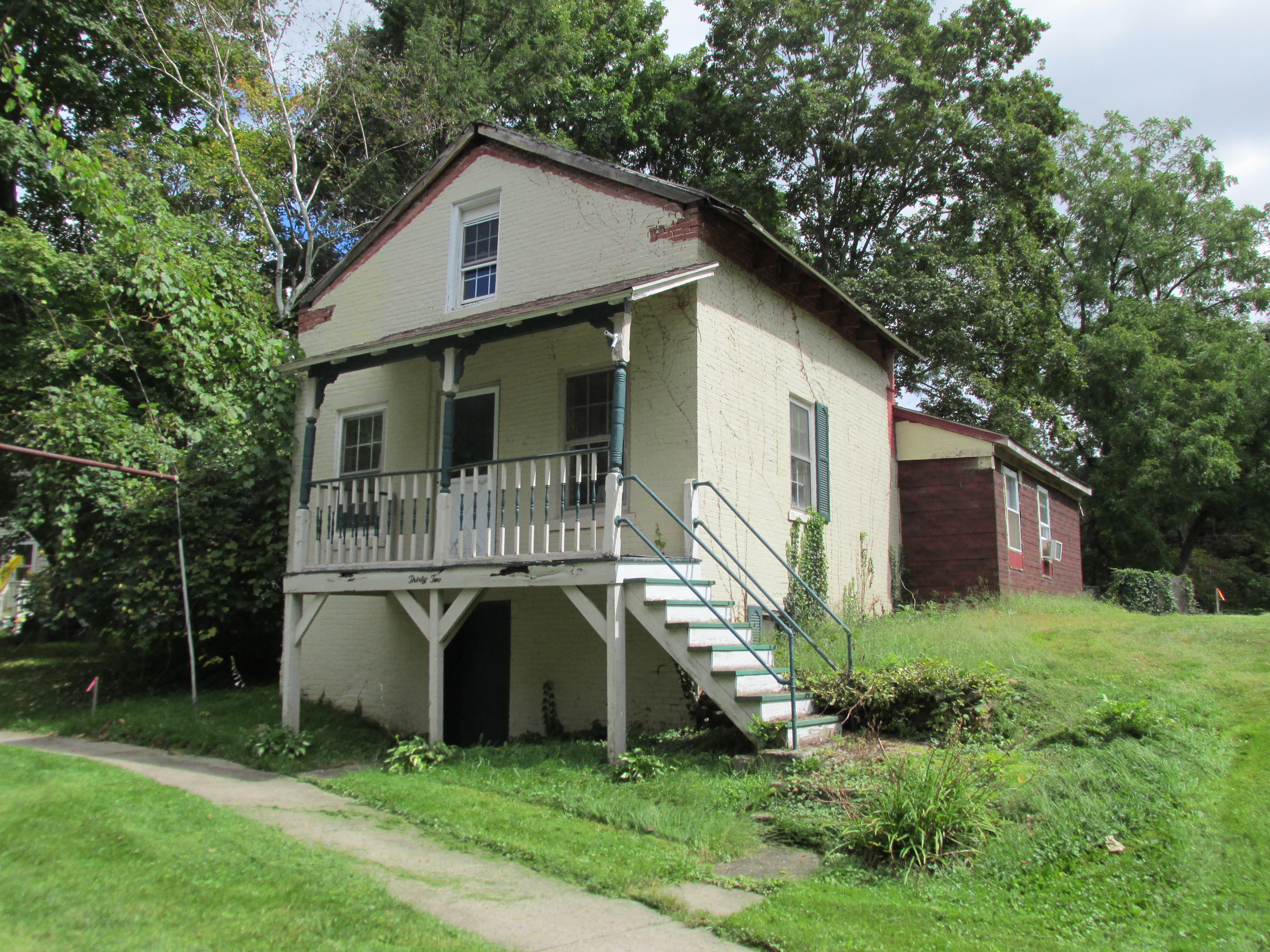

- Location within Connecticut Location within the United States
- Location: 32 East Street, Windsor, Connecticut
- Coordinates: 41°51′25″N 72°38′57″W
- Area: 0.3 acres (0.12 ha)
- Built: c. 1850; 176 years ago
- Architectural style: Greek Revival, Italianate
- MPS: 18th and 19th Century Brick Architecture of Windsor TR
- NRHP reference No.: 88001482
- Added to NRHP: September 15, 1988

Hathaways Store is a historic formerly commercial building at 32 East Street in Windsor, Connecticut. Built about 1850, it is a good local example of vernacular Italianate architecture in brick, and a reminder of the formerly industrial heritage of its immediate surroundings. It was listed on the National Register of Historic Places in 1988.

== Description and history ==
The former Hathaways Store building stands northwest of downtown Windsor, on the east side of East Street near its crossing of Mill Brook. It is a 2-1/2 story structure, built of painted brick and covered by a gabled roof. It is set close the street on a steeply sloping lot, present two stories to the front and a single-story wood-frame addition to the rear. The front has one entry at the center of the three-bay facade on the ground floor, and a second above that on the second floor, accessed by a two-bay shed-roof porch, whose stairs extend to the right side. The porch has turned posts and balusters, with brackets at the roof. The main roof eaves are trimmed with simple Italianate bracketing. The upper entrance is flanked by sash windows with simple trim, and there is another window in the gable end above.

The store was built about 1850, when the East Street area was populated with a number of mills and other industries. One small mill stood just to the west, and there was also a blacksmith's shop across the street. The first proprietor was Duane Hathaway, a farmer who lived farther down East Street.

== See also ==
- National Register of Historic Places listings in Windsor, Connecticut
