= Eli Phelps House =

Historic house in Connecticut, United States

- U.S. National Register of Historic Places
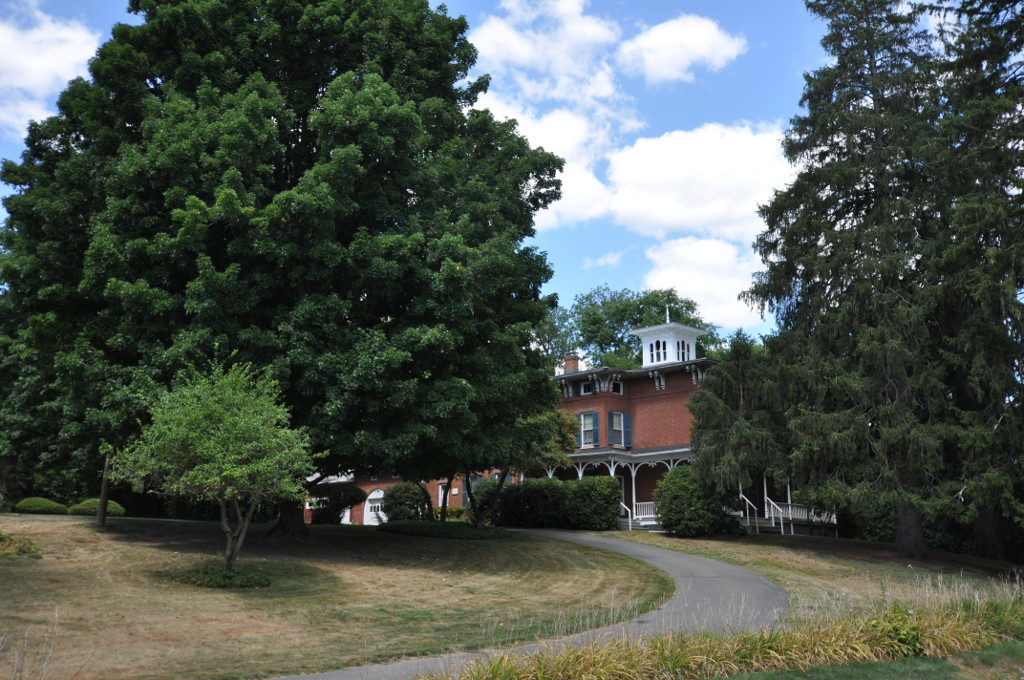

- Location within Connecticut Location within the United States
- Location: 18 Marshall Phelps Road, Windsor, Connecticut
- Coordinates: 41°53′23″N 72°40′33″W
- Area: 1.3 acres (0.53 ha)
- Built: 1860
- Architectural style: Italianate
- MPS: 18th and 19th Century Brick Architecture of Windsor TR
- NRHP reference No.: 88001487
- Added to NRHP: September 15, 1988

The Eli Phelps House is a historic house at 18 Marshall Phelps Road in Windsor, Connecticut. Built about 1860, it is one of the town's largest and most elaborate examples of Italianate architecture executed in brick. It was listed on the National Register of Historic Places in 1988.

== Description and history ==
The Eli Phelps House stands in what is now a residential area of Northern Windsor, on the North Side of Marshall Phelps Road, just West of Kendrick Lane. It is a two-story masonry structure, with a flat roof that has deep eaves supported by paired Italianate brackets. The roof is topped by a square cupola, also with a deep bracketed roof, with groups of round-arch windows on each side. The North and South Sides of the building each have a projecting polygonal window bay two stories in height. Most windows are set in rectangular openings with simple trim, and have cut stone sills and lintels. A single-story porch wraps around the East and South Sides. A two-story brick ell extends to the rear of the house, joining it to a brick carriage house.

The house was built about 1860 by Eli Phelps, a tobacco farmer. The size and scale of the house demonstrate the prosperity of Windsor's farmers in the mid-19th century. Of the town's surviving Italianate houses, this one is the largest and most elaborately styled.

== See also ==
- National Register of Historic Places listings in Windsor, Connecticut
