= Horace H. Ellsworth House =

Historic house in Connecticut, United States

- U.S. National Register of Historic Places
- U.S. Historic district – Contributing property
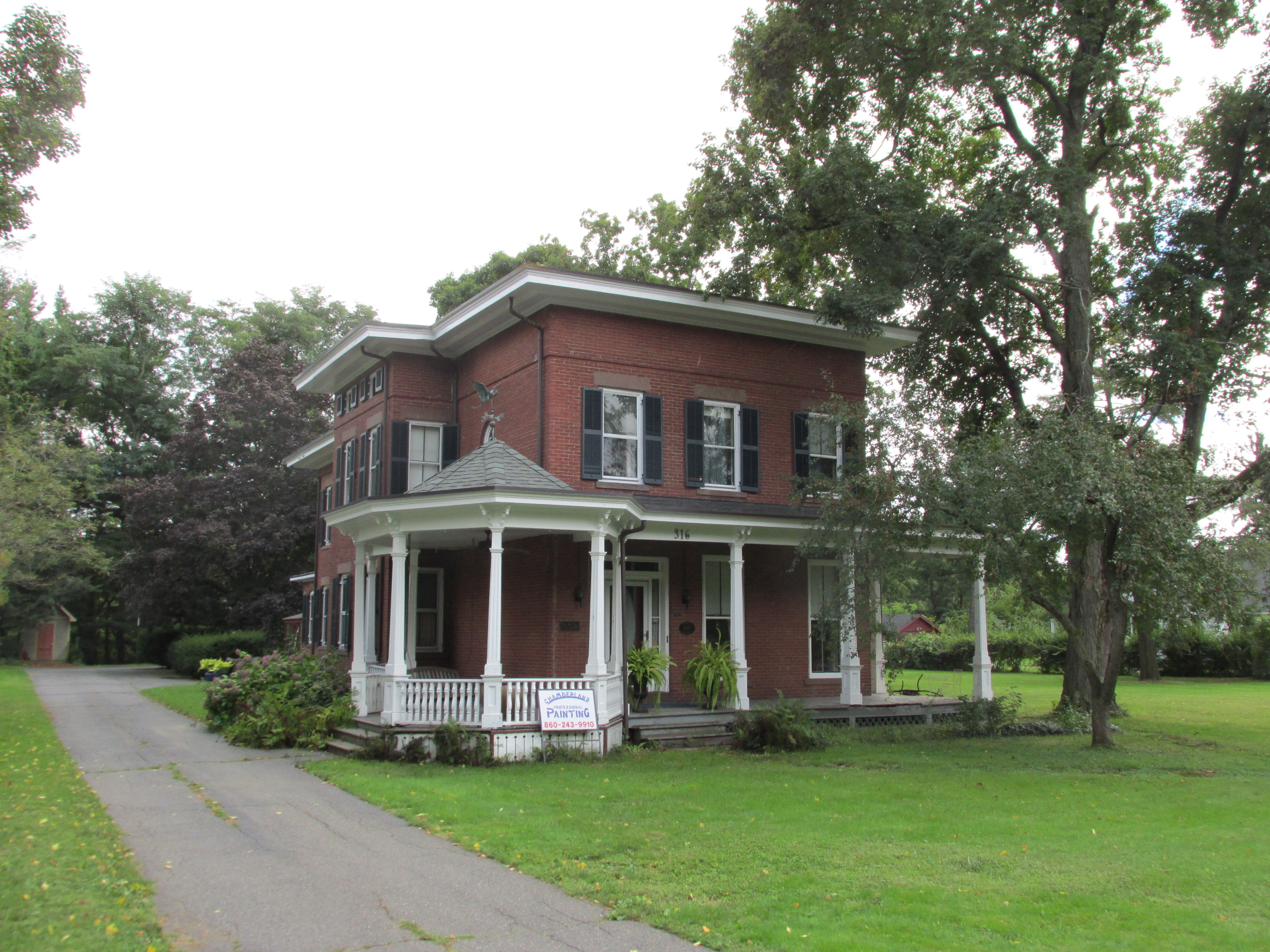

- Location within Connecticut Location within the United States
- Interactive map of Horace H. Ellsworth House
- Location: 316 Palisado Avenue, Windsor, Connecticut
- Coordinates: 41°51′49″N 72°37′53″W
- Area: less than one acre
- Built: 1872
- Architectural style: Italianate
- Part of: Palisado Avenue Historic District (ID87000799)
- MPS: 18th and 19th Century Brick Architecture of Windsor TR
- NRHP reference No.: 88001489

Significant dates
- Added to NRHP: September 15, 1988
- Designated CP: August 25, 1987

The Horace H. Ellsworth House is a historic house at 316 Palisado Avenue in Windsor, Connecticut. It was built in 1872 for one of Windsor's leading citizens, and is a fine example of Italianate architecture executed in brick. It was listed on the National Register of Historic Places in 1988.

== Description and history ==
The Horace H. Ellsworth House is located north of the village center of Windsor, on the east side of Palisado Avenue (Connecticut Route 159), a short way north of its junction with Old Kennedy Road. Palisado Avenue is a historically old road, once serving as the principal route paralleling the west bank of the Connecticut River. The house is a two-story brick structure, covered by a flat roof with a projecting cornice. Its main block is three bays wide and two deep, with windows set in rectangular openings with stone lintels and sills. A single-story porch extends across the front, continuing on the left (north) end to a corner gazebo-like pavilion. The main entrance is on the left side. A two-story ell projects to the rear, continued with a single-story ell beyond.

The house was built in 1872 for Horace H. Ellsworth, and is distinctive locally for its Italianate style in brick, which contrasts with surrounding older buildings. Its first resident was Ellsworth's father, with Ellsworth and his family moving in after his father died. The house remained in the family until 1955. Horace Ellsworth was a local business owner, serving as director of a local cannery, and with interests in a commercial building and lumber business.

== See also ==
- National Register of Historic Places listings in Windsor, Connecticut
