= Benomi Case House =

Historic house in Connecticut, United States

- U.S. National Register of Historic Places
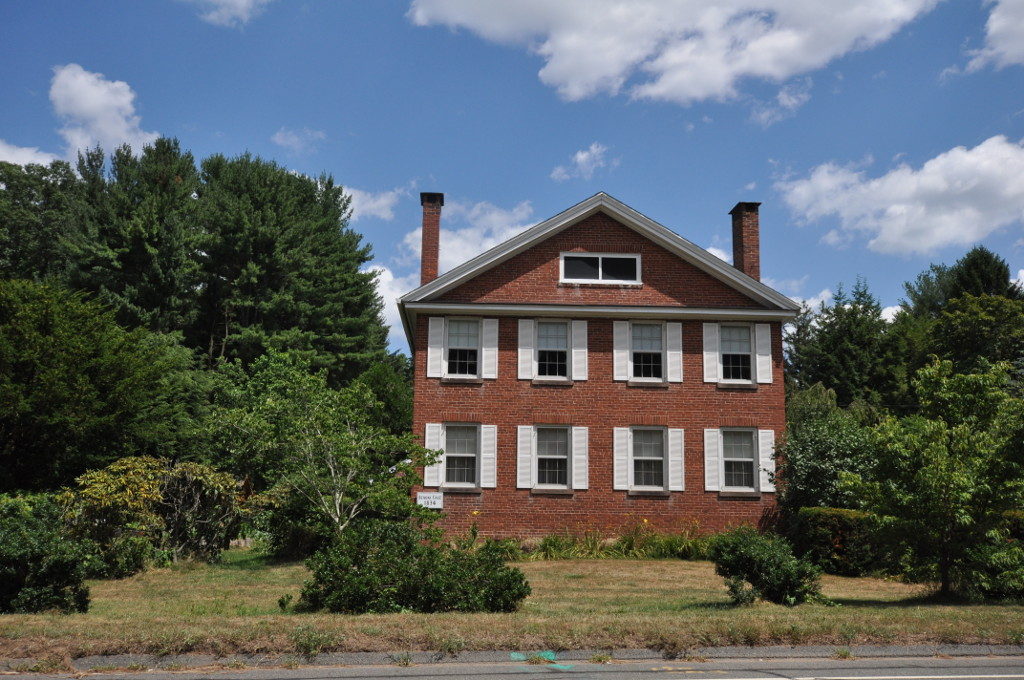

- Location within Connecticut Location within the United States
- Location: 436 Rainbow Road, Windsor, Connecticut
- Coordinates: 41°55′5″N 72°41′35″W
- Area: 0.7 acres (0.28 ha)
- Built: 1834
- Architectural style: Greek Revival
- MPS: 18th and 19th Century Brick Architecture of Windsor TR
- NRHP reference No.: 88001497
- Added to NRHP: September 15, 1988

The Benomi Case House is a historic house at 436 Rainbow Road in Windsor, Connecticut. Built in 1834, it is one of the town's finest examples of Greek Revival architecture in brick. It was listed on the National Register of Historic Places in 1988.

== Description and history ==
The Benomi Case House is located in what is now a suburban residential area of northwestern Windsor, on the north side of Rainbow Road between East Granby and Hamilton Roads. It is a 2 1/2-story masonry structure, built of brick with stone trim and covered by a gabled roof, measuring about 72 by 27 feet (21.9 m × 8.2 m). It faces roughly east, and is five bays wide and four deep, with two end chimneys on each side. The main facade has a center entrance with sidelights and a transom window above. The side gables, framed in wood, are fully pedimented, and have rectangular windows with tracery at their centers. A single-story ell with garage extends to the north. The property also includes a 19th-century shed.

The house was built in 1834 by Benomi Case, a farmer. After Case's son Otis died in 1888, the house was purchased by Manley Snow, in whose family it remained for nearly 100 years. The house is a simple and elegant example of the Greek Revival.

== See also ==
- National Register of Historic Places listings in Windsor, Connecticut
