= House at 111 Maple Avenue =

Historic house in Connecticut, United States

- U.S. National Register of Historic Places
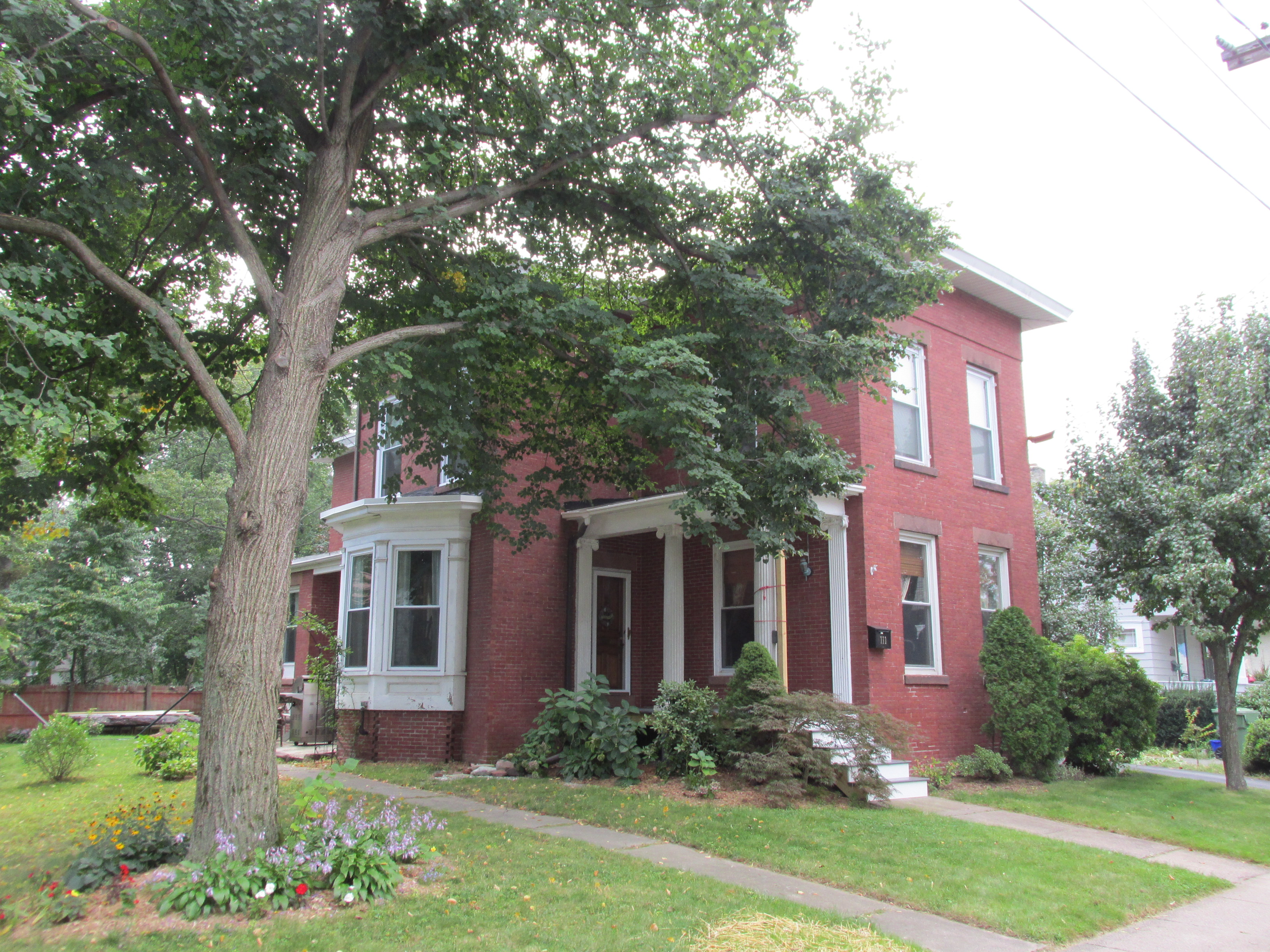

- Location within Connecticut Location within the United States
- Location: 111 Maple Avenue, Windsor, Connecticut
- Coordinates: 41°51′4″N 72°38′59″W
- Area: 0.2 acres (0.081 ha)
- Built: 1872
- Architectural style: Italianate
- MPS: 18th and 19th Century Brick Architecture of Windsor TR
- NRHP reference No.: 88001486
- Added to NRHP: September 15, 1988

111 Maple Avenue is a historic house in Windsor, Connecticut. Built about 1871, it is a good local example of Italianate architecture, with lingering Greek Revival touches. It was listed on the National Register of Historic Places in 1988.

== Description and history ==
111 Maple Avenue stands on the South Side of the Street, a residential street extending west from Downtown Windsor, between Welch Avenue and Preston Street. It is now surrounded by more recent construction. It is a two-story L-shaped brick structure, with a flat roof whose eaves extend well beyond the walls. Its front facade is two bays wide, with sash windows set in rectangular openings with sandstone sills and lintels. The main entrance is on the left side, sheltered by a single-story two-bay porch set in the crook of the L. The porch is supported by Ionic columns, and has a Greek Revival entablature. The left side of the L has a single-story projecting polygonal bay window, topped by a shallow-pitch roof with cornice. A brick two-story ell extends the building further to the rear, with a second entry porch on its west side.

The house was built on land purchased by John Bruce in October 1871. Bruce was a local builder, whose other brick buildings include 30 Maple Avenue.

== See also ==
- National Register of Historic Places listings in Windsor, Connecticut
