= Bissell Tavern-Bissell's Stage House =

Historic tavern in Connecticut, United States

- U.S. National Register of Historic Places
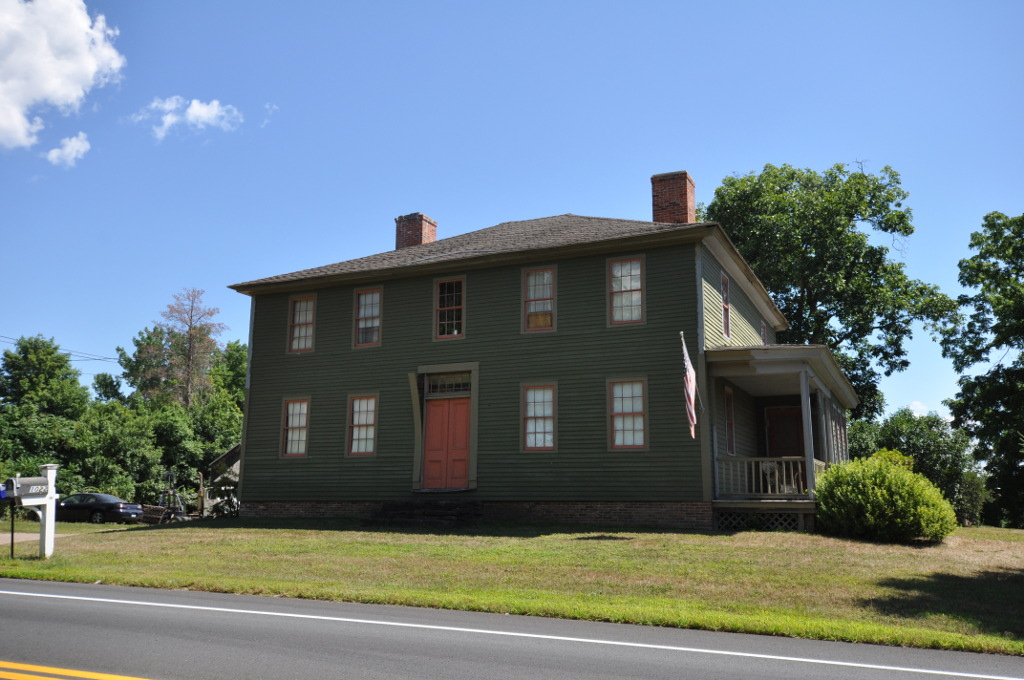

- Location within Connecticut Location within the United States
- Location: 1022 Palisado Avenue, Windsor, Connecticut
- Coordinates: 41°53′12″N 72°37′38″W
- Area: 1 acre (0.40 ha)
- Built: 1796
- Built by: Bissell, Ebenezer F., Sr.
- Architectural style: Georgian
- NRHP reference No.: 85001825
- Added to NRHP: August 23, 1985

The Bissell Tavern or Bissell's Stage House is a historic traveler's accommodation at 1022 Palisado Avenue in Windsor, Connecticut. Now a private residence, it was built in 1796, and served in the 19th century as a stagecoach stop along the main route between Springfield, Massachusetts and Hartford, Connecticut. It was listed on the National Register of Historic Places in 1985.

== Description and history ==
The former Bissell Tavern is located in northern Windsor, on the east side of Palisado Avenue (Connecticut Route 159), south of its junction with Hayden Station Road. Palisado Avenue is the major non-highway north–south route along the west bank of the Connecticut River. The tavern house is a two-story wood-frame structure, with a hip roof, end chimneys, and clapboarded exterior. The main facade is five bays wide, with a center entrance topped by a four-light transom window. There is a 19th-century porch attached to the south side, and a single-story ell to the rear.

The tavern was built in 1796 by Ebenezer Fitch Bissell, Sr. The Bissells were one of the first families to settle Windsor, arriving in 1640. Bissell was a veteran of the American Revolutionary War who had been captured in the Battle of Long Island. The Palisado Green area, just south of the tavern, developed in the early 19th century as a trading nexus, and Bissell's son turned the house into a tavern, a role it apparently kept until about 1833. It has remained in the interrelated Bissell and Hayden families as a private residence since then.

== See also ==
- National Register of Historic Places listings in Windsor, Connecticut
