= Hezekiah Chaffee House =

Historic house in Connecticut, United States

- U.S. National Register of Historic Places
- U.S. Historic district – Contributing property
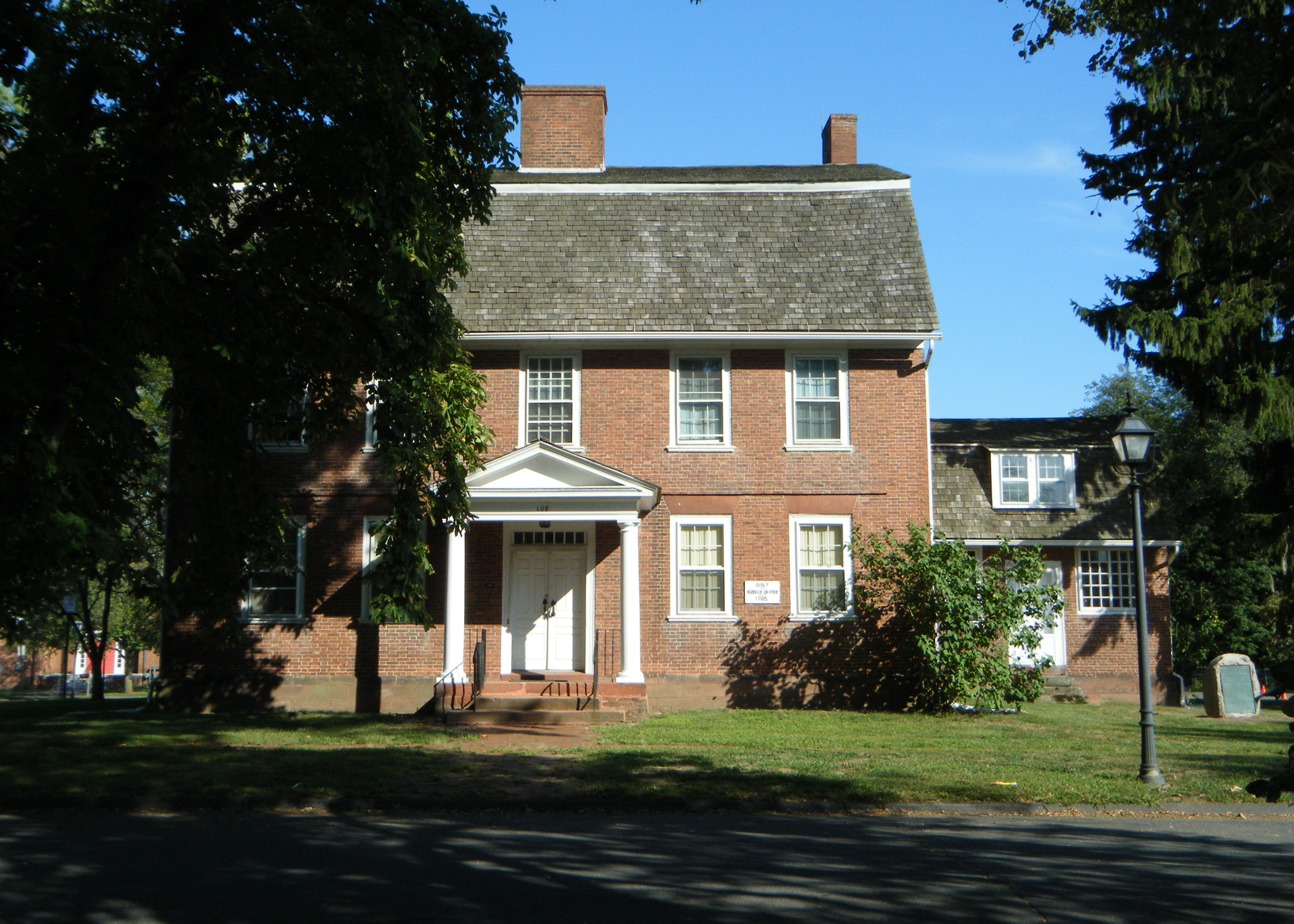

- Location within Connecticut Location within the United States
- Location: 108 Palisado Avenue, Windsor, Connecticut
- Coordinates: 41°51′25″N 72°38′19″W
- Area: 1 acre (0.40 ha)
- Built: 1765
- Architectural style: Georgian
- Part of: Palisado Avenue Historic District (ID87000799)
- NRHP reference No.: 72001336

Significant dates
- Added to NRHP: August 31, 1972
- Designated CP: August 25, 1987

The Hezekiah Chaffee House is a historic house museum on Meadow Lane in Windsor, Connecticut. Built about 1765, it is one of Windsor's largest and most elaborate Georgian brick houses. The house was listed on the National Register of Historic Places in 1972, and is a contributing property to the Palisado Avenue Historic District, listed in 1987. It is owned and operated by the Windsor Historical Society, which offers tours on a year-round basis.

== Description and history ==
The Hezekiah Chaffee House stands on the east side of the Palisado Green, Windsor's earliest settlement area just north of the Farmington River. It is a large two-story brick structure, with a gambrel roof and central chimney. The brick is laid in Flemish bond, and the house stands on a foundation of red sandstone. There are two gambrel-roofed ells, 1 1/2 stories in height, extending to the south and northeast. They appear to be contemporaneous to the main block, sharing a similar foundation. The main facade is five bays wide, with a center entrance topped by a five-light transom window. It is sheltered by a later Greek Revival portico, with a pedimented gable and Doric columns.

The house was built c. 1765 for Dr. Hezekiah Chaffee, who had bought the land in 1755. It remained in the Chaffee family until 1926, when it was acquired by the Loomis Institute, then a boys prep school, to house a girls school known as the Chaffee School. The two schools are now united on a different campus as the Loomis Chaffee School. The house is now run as a museum property by the Windsor Historical Society and is open year-round, Wednesday - Saturday from 11 am to 4 pm.

== See also ==
- National Register of Historic Places listings in Windsor, Connecticut
