= Gordon Loomis House =

Historic house in Connecticut, United States

- U.S. National Register of Historic Places
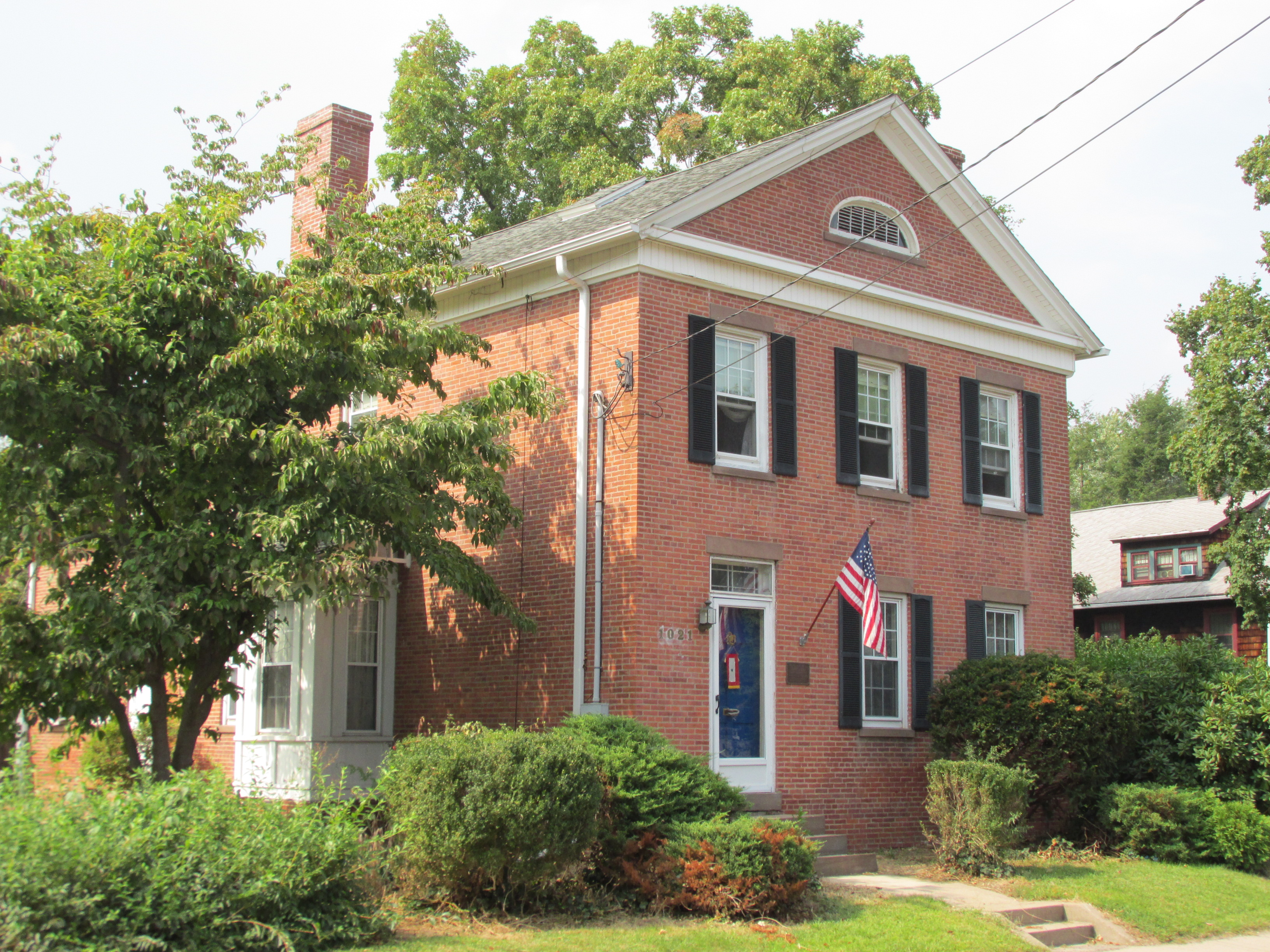

- Location within Connecticut Location within the United States
- Location: 1021 Windsor Avenue, Windsor, Connecticut
- Coordinates: 41°50′5″N 72°39′18″W
- Area: 0.5 acres (0.20 ha)
- Built: 1835
- Architectural style: Greek Revival, Federal
- MPS: 18th and 19th Century Brick Architecture of Windsor TR
- NRHP reference No.: 88001501
- Added to NRHP: September 15, 1988

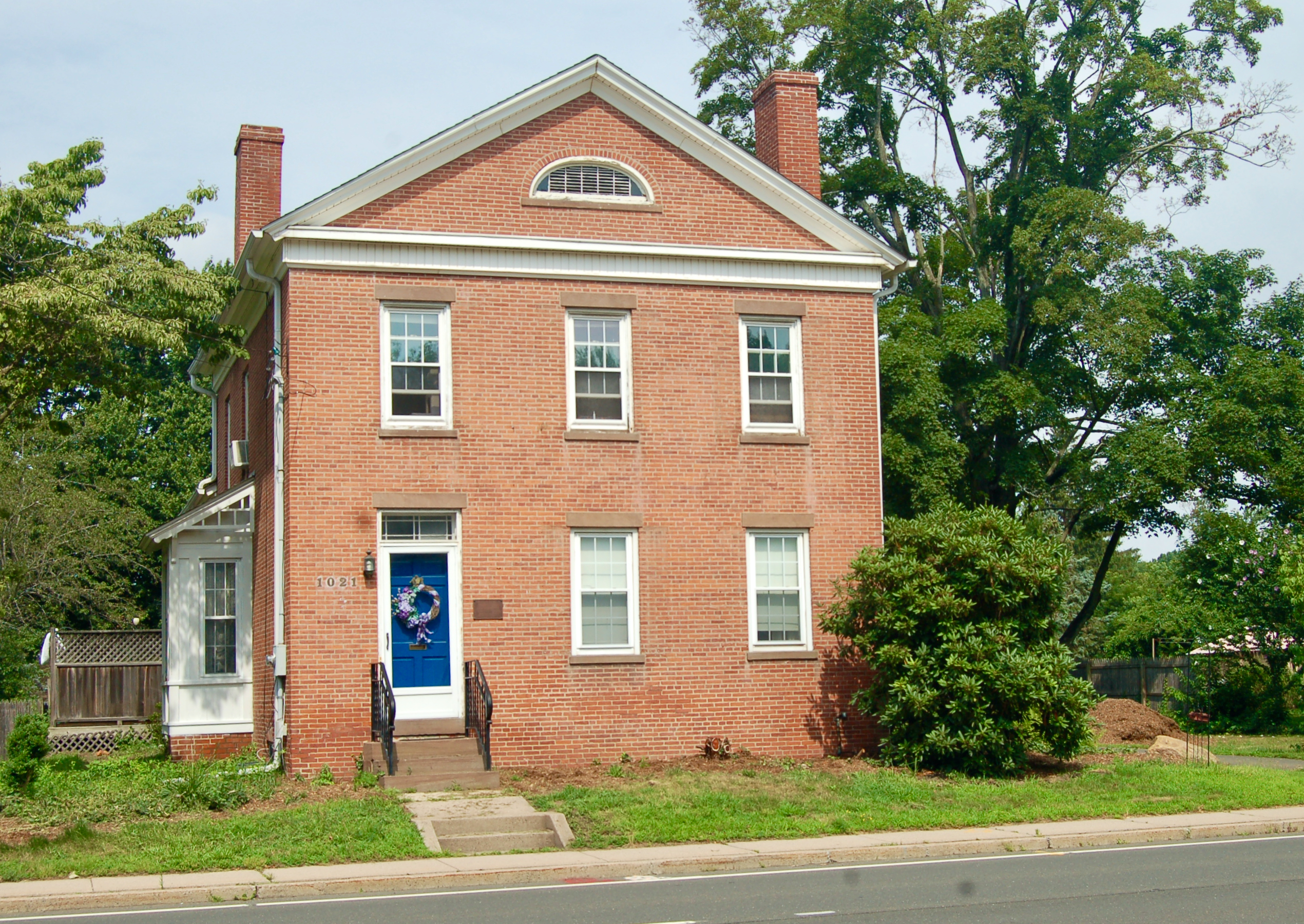
Gordon Loomis House

The Gordon Loomis House is a historic house at 1021 Windsor Avenue in Windsor, Connecticut. Built in 1835, it is a good local example of transitional Federal-Greek Revival architecture executed in brick. It was listed on the National Register of Historic Places in 1988.

== Description and history ==
The Gordon Loomis House is located in southern Windsor, on the west side of Windsor Avenue between Giddings Avenue and Ludlow Road. Windsor Avenue, designated Connecticut Route 159, is the town's major north–south road, paralleling the Connecticut River. The house is 2 1/2 stories in height, with brick walls and a front-facing gabled roof. The roof is pierced by two brick chimneys; it originally had four that were symmetrically placed. (edited 9/1/2018 by current owner: There are still four chimneys. One in the right-front (NE) with a fireplace on 1st and 2nd floor - Two on the north and south walls of the center room, both with fireplaces on the 1st and 2nd floor, though the one on the 2nd floor north is walled-in - And one on the west end, with fireplace on 1st floor; the cooking fireplace with beehive oven.) The main facade is three bays wide, with the main entrance in the leftmost bay, topped by a transom window. Windows are set in rectangular openings, with stone sills and lintels. An entablature encircles the house, and the front gable is fully pedimented, with a half-oval window at its center. A bay window one story in height projects from the south side. A brick ell extends to the west, with a wood-frame addition extending even further.

The house was built in 1834 for Gordon Loomis, a farmer, on land given him by his father. It is one of a series of period brick houses in the area, built using bricks manufactured in local brickyards.

== See also ==
- National Register of Historic Places listings in Windsor, Connecticut
