= Capt. Nathaniel Hayden House =

Historic house in Connecticut, United States

- Captain Nathaniel Hayden House
- U.S. National Register of Historic Places
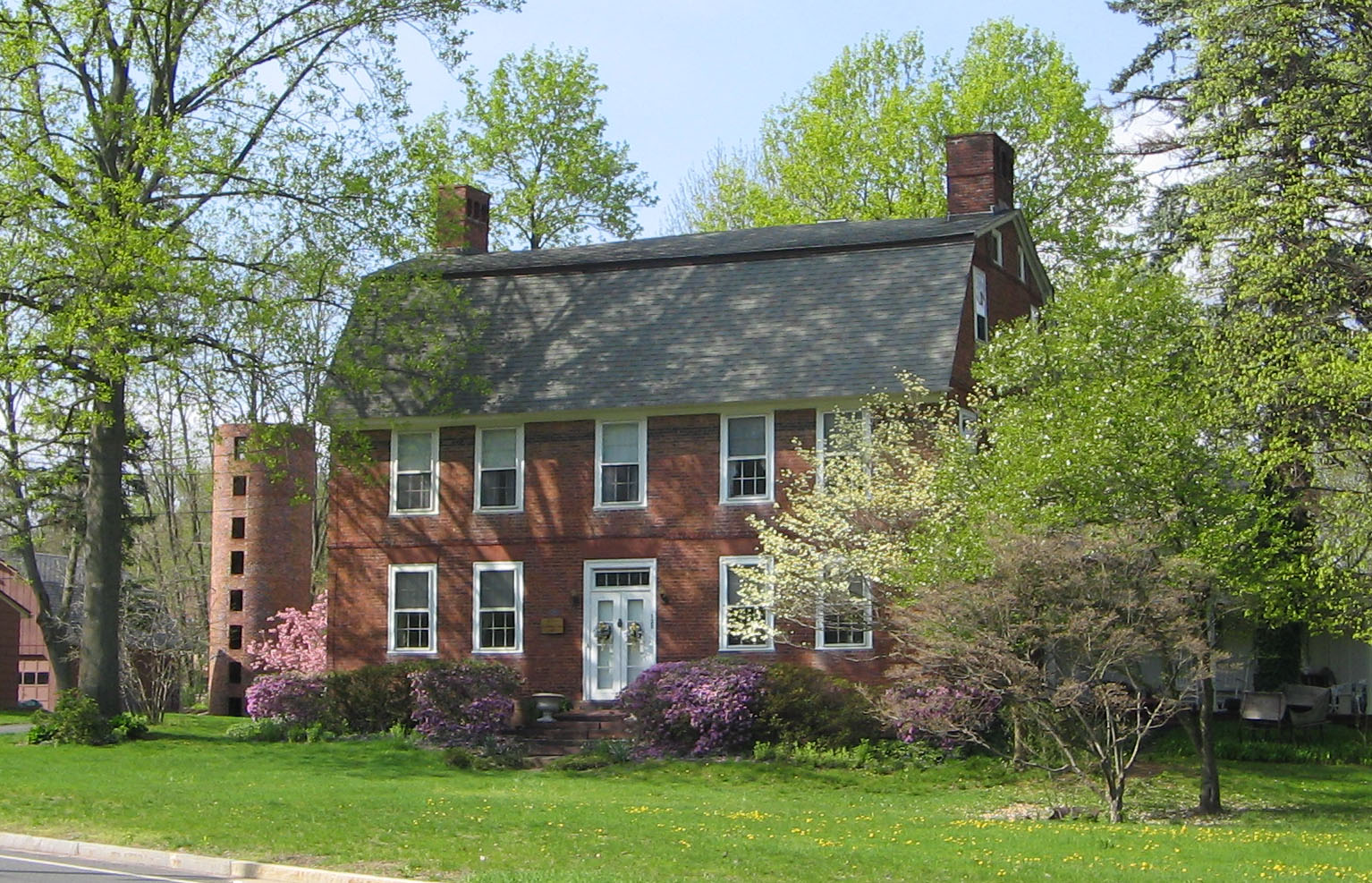
- The Captain Nathaniel Hayden House
- Location: 128 Hayden Station Road, Windsor, Connecticut
- Coordinates: 41°53′31.6″N 72°37′53.1″W
- Built: 1763
- MPS: 18th and 19th Century Brick Architecture of Windsor TR
- NRHP reference No.: 88001483
- Added to NRHP: September 15, 1988

The Captain Nathaniel Hayden House is a historic house at 128 Hayden Station Road in Windsor, Connecticut. Built in 1763, it is an excellent local example of Colonial brick architecture. It was listed on the National Register of Historic Places in 1988.

== Captain Hayden ==
Nathaniel Hayden, son of Nathaniel Hayden, was born on December 14, 1738. He first married Anna Flier, then Rhoda Lyman. With Rhoda, he had four children: Nancy, Nathaniel Lyman, Naomi, and Pliny. He went to work with his father as a farmer and a shoemaker but joined the Continental Army. When news of the Battles of Lexington and Concord reached Connecticut, he led 23 men to Massachusetts to take part.

When George Washington evacuated New York City during the Battle of Long Island in 1776, Hayden was with the army. He also led a group in 1777 to thwart John Burgoyne at Saratoga, but Burgoyne surrendered before he arrived.

== The house ==
The house is a 2 1/2-story brick structure with a side-gable gambrel roof, end chimneys, and a rear wood-frame ell. The main entrance is a double door centered on the front facade, topped by a transom window. It was built by Nathaniel Hayden in 1763. The home was inherited by Captain Hayden's son Nathaniel. He occupied it with his wife Lucretia and their children. "They occupied the spacious brick house built by their father. The tannery and the shoemaker's shop were unoccupied, and they then gave their undivided attention to their farm..."

It was then passed down to Nathaniel Lyman Hayden Junior, born in 1805, who died there in 1875 after many years of traveling as a banker and living in South Carolina and New York City.

The house continues to be a private residence.

== See also ==
- National Register of Historic Places listings in Windsor, Connecticut
