= Daniel Payne House =

Historic house in Connecticut, United States

- U.S. National Register of Historic Places
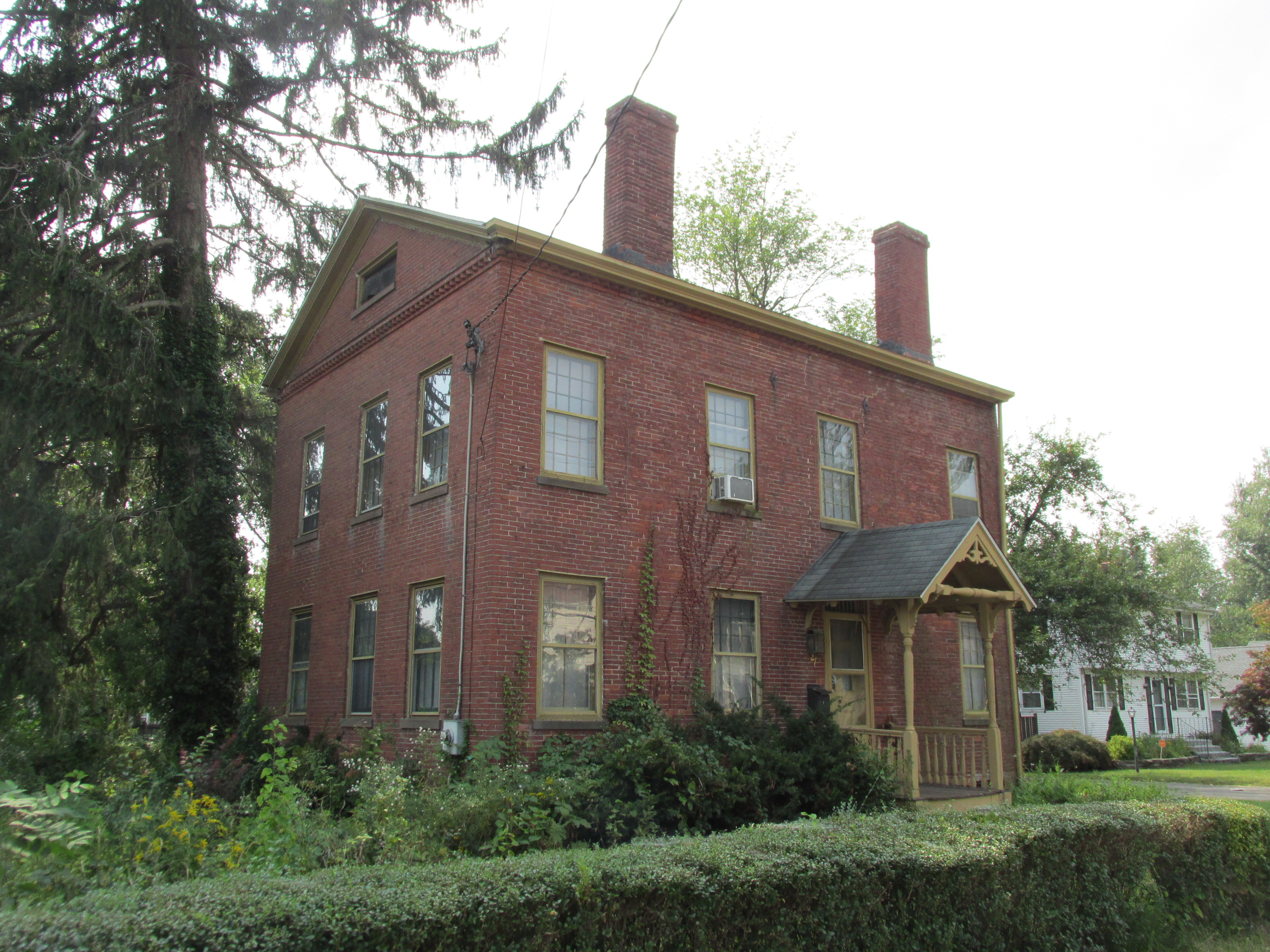

- Location within Connecticut Location within the United States
- Location: 27 Park Avenue, Windsor, Connecticut
- Coordinates: 41°50′20″N 72°39′14″W
- Area: 0.3 acres (0.12 ha)
- Built: 1830
- Architectural style: Greek Revival
- MPS: 18th and 19th Century Brick Architecture of Windsor TR
- NRHP reference No.: 88001495
- Added to NRHP: September 15, 1988

The Daniel Payne House is a historic house at 27 Park Avenue in Windsor, Connecticut. Built about 1830, it is a well-preserved example of a brick house with Greek Revival styling. It was listed on the National Register of Historic Places in 1988.

== Description and history ==
The Daniel Payne House is located in southern Windsor, on the south side of Park Avenue (Connecticut Route 178), a short way west of its junction with Connecticut Route 159. It is a two-story brick building, with a low-pitch gabled roof and four interior brick chimneys. The main facade is four bays wide, with the main entrance in the center-right bay. The entry is sheltered by a Victorian porch with a gabled roof and turned posts. Windows are set in rectangular openings, with narrow brownstone sills and lintels. A band of brick corbelling extends around the building at the cornice level, giving the side gable ends a pedimented appearance. A 20th-century garage is located behind the house.

The house was built about 1830. Its first documented owner was Clarissa Loomis, who sold it in 1855 to Daniel Payne, a farmer. The house is a well-preserved example of brick houses that were built in larger number in the area.

== See also ==
- National Register of Historic Places listings in Windsor, Connecticut
