= Stony Hill School (Windsor, Connecticut) =

- U.S. National Register of Historic Places
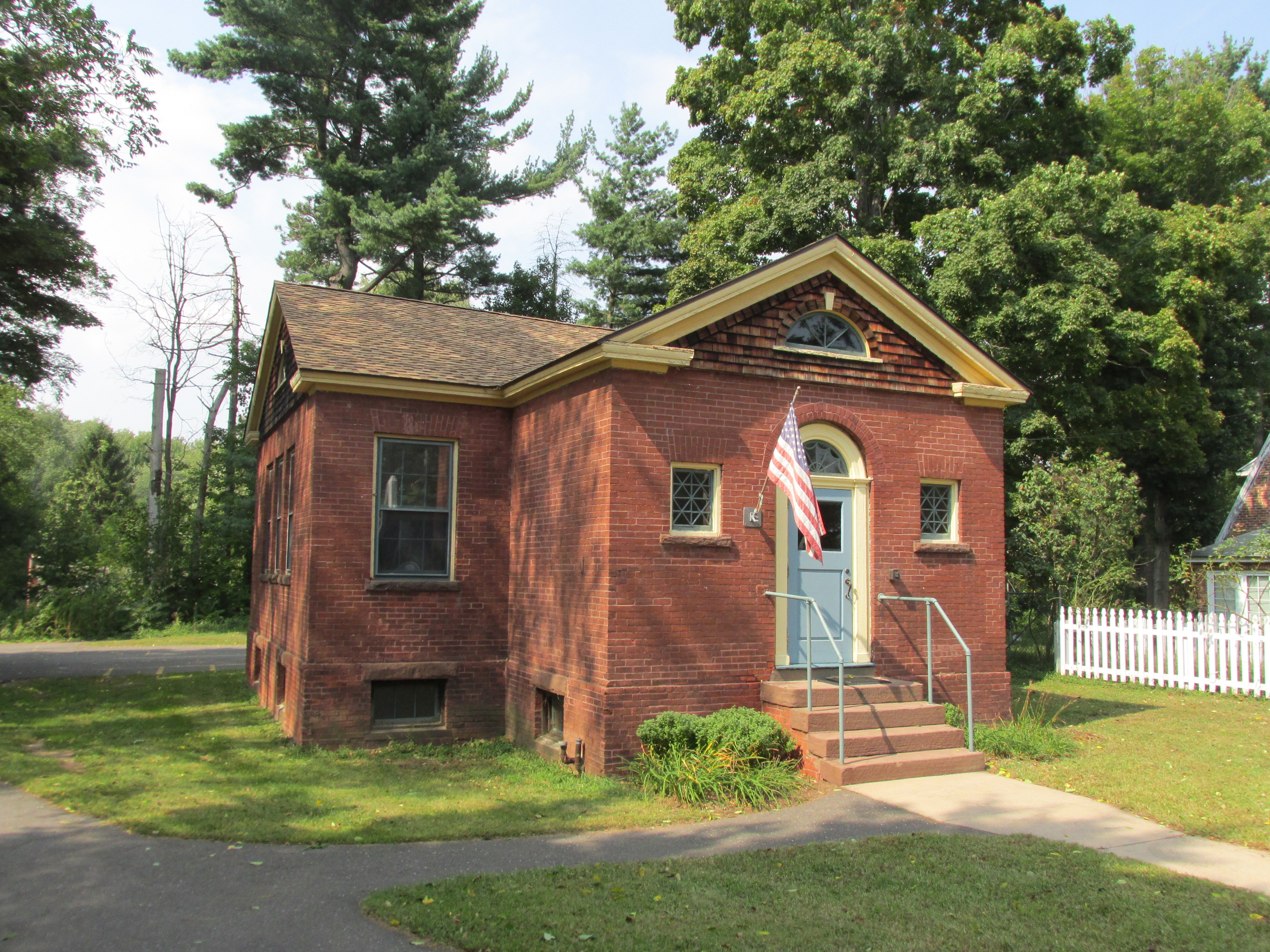

- Location within Connecticut Location within the United States
- Location: 1195 Windsor Avenue, Windsor, Connecticut
- Coordinates: 41°50′25″N 72°39′4″W
- Area: 0.3 acres (0.12 ha)
- Built: 1856
- Architectural style: Colonial Revival
- MPS: 18th and 19th Century Brick Architecture of Windsor TR
- NRHP reference No.: 88001504
- Added to NRHP: September 15, 1988

The Stony Hill School is a historic school building at 1195 Windsor Avenue in Windsor, Connecticut. Built in 1856 and extensively altered after a move in 1899, it is an example of a brick Colonial Revival district schoolhouse. It was listed on the National Register of Historic Places in 1988.

== Description and history ==
The Stony Hill School is located in southern Windsor, on the west side of Windsor Avenue (Connecticut Route 159) just north of its junction with Hillcrest Road. It is a single-story masonry structure, with a rectangular main block and projecting entry vestibule, each covered by a gabled roof. The gable ends are framed in wood and finished in shingles, and have returns at the base. The entry projection is symmetrical, with two small square fixed-pane windows flanking an arched entrance with transom window. Windows are otherwise set in rectangular openings, with cut brownstone sills and slightly splayed headers made of soldier bricks. A wood-frame addition to the rear of the building provides space originally used as an outhouse.

The school was built in 1856 to a simpler plan, and was originally located across the street. In 1899, Doctor Evastus Case traded with the town, giving them this parcel in exchange for the one on which it stood. At that time the building underwent major alterations, giving it its present form. From that point on, the building changed very little.

== See also ==
- National Register of Historic Places listings in Windsor, Connecticut
