= Mills House =

Mills House may refer to:

- Mills House (Sitka, Alaska)
- W.P. Mills House, Sitka, Alaska
- Mills House (Kensett, Arkansas)
- Mills House (Pine Bluff, Arkansas)
- Henry Clay Mills House, Van Buren, Arkansas
- Elijah Mills House, Windsor, Connecticut
- Oliver W. Mills House, Windsor, Connecticut
- Timothy Dwight Mills House, Windsor, Connecticut
- Mills House (Griffin, Georgia), a National Register of Historic Places listing in Spalding County, Georgia
- Mills House and Smokehouse, Griffin, Georgia
- William Mills House, Osawatomie, Kansas, a National Register of Historic Places listing in Miami County, Kansas
- Davis Mills House, Needham, Massachusetts
- Timothy Mills House, Morristown, New Jersey, a National Register of Historic Places listing in Morris County, New Jersey
- Mills House (Springer, New Mexico)
- Gen. William A. Mills House, Mount Morris, New York
- Mills House (New York, New York)
- Mills House (Rome, New York)
- Harriet May Mills House, Syracuse, New York
- Warren Mills House, Klamath Falls, Oregon, a National Register of Historic Places listing in Oregon
- Lewis H. Mills House (1916), Portland, Oregon
- Lewis H. Mills House (1929), Portland, Oregon
- Mills House (Fort Mill, South Carolina)
- Richard W. and Margaret Mills House, Lodi, Wisconsin
- Simeon Mills House, Madison, Wisconsin

== See also ==
- Enos Mills Homestead Cabin, Estes Park, Colorado, a National Register of Historic Places listing in Larimer County, Colorado
- Job Mills Block, Lodi, Wisconsin
- James Mills Storehouse, Urbanna, Virginia
- Robert Mills Dairy Barn, Half Moon Bay, California, a National Register of Historic Places listing in San Mateo County, California
- Wilcox-Mills House, Marietta, Ohio, a National Register of Historic Places listing in Washington County, Ohio
