= Lewis Mill =

Lewis Mill may refer to:

- Lewis Mill (Telluride, Colorado), a historic building
- Lewis Mill Complex, a historic mill in Maryland
- Lewis Mill, Missouri, an unincorporated community

== See also ==
- Lewis Mills (disambiguation)
- Lewis H. Mills House (disambiguation)
