= Goodrich House =

Goodrich House may refer to:

- Goodrich House, Cleveland, Cleveland, Ohio, USA
- Goodrich House Residence Hall, Northwestern University, Illinois, USA
- Heman R. Goodrich House, Hudson in west Lenawee County, Michigan, USA
- Pritchard-Moore-Goodrich House, Griffin, Georgia, USA
- William T. Goodrich House, Davenport, Iowa, USA

== See also ==
- Solomon Goodrich Homestead, historic house in Georgia, Vermont, USA
