= Lewis Mills =

Lewis Mills may refer to:

- Lewis Mills (basketball) (1937–2011), basketball coach
- Lewis Mills (rugby league) (born 1989), Wales international rugby league footballer
- Lewis Este Mills (1836–1878), American lawyer and author
- Lewis S. Mills (1874–1965), American educator and author

== See also ==
- Lewis H. Mills House (disambiguation)
- Lewis Mill (disambiguation)
