= 137th Ohio Infantry Regiment =

- Active: May 6, 1864, to August 21, 1864
- Country: United States
- Allegiance: Union
- Branch: Infantry

The 137th Ohio Infantry Regiment, sometimes 137th Ohio Volunteer Infantry (or 137th OVI) was an infantry regiment in the Union Army during the American Civil War.

== Service ==
The 137th Ohio Infantry was organized at Camp Dennison near Cincinnati, Ohio, and mustered in May 6, 1864, for 100 days service under the command of Colonel Leonard A. Harris.

The regiment left Ohio for Baltimore, Maryland, on May 12. It was assigned to garrison duty Forts McHenry, Federal Hill, Marshall, and Carroll. Served in the defenses of Baltimore, VIII Corps, Middle Department, until August.

The 137th Ohio Infantry mustered out of service at Camp Dennison on August 21, 1864.

== Ohio National Guard ==
Over 35,000 Ohio National Guardsmen were federalized and organized into regiments for 100 days service in May 1864. Shipped to the Eastern Theater, they were designed to be placed in "safe" rear areas to protect railroads and supply points, thereby freeing regular troops for Lt. Gen. Ulysses S. Grant’s push on the Confederate capital of Richmond, Virginia. As events transpired, many units found themselves in combat, stationed in the path of Confederate Gen. Jubal Early’s veteran Army of the Valley during its famed Valley Campaigns of 1864. Ohio Guard units met the battle-tested foe head on and helped blunt the Confederate offensive thereby saving Washington, D.C. from capture. Ohio National Guard units participated in the battles of Monacacy, Fort Stevens, Harpers Ferry, and in the siege of Petersburg.

== Casualties ==
The regiment lost 5 enlisted men during service, 3 due to disease and 2 in a railroad accident.

== Commanders ==
- Colonel Leonard A. Harris

== Notable members ==
- Captain Alfred Traber Goshorn, Company F - first president of the Cincinnati Base Ball Club, established July 23, 1866 (forerunner of the Cincinnati Red Stockings) and Director-General of the 1876 Centennial Exposition

== See also ==
- List of Ohio Civil War units
- Ohio in the Civil War
