= National Register of Historic Places listings in Spalding County, Georgia =

Map of Georgia with Spalding County highlighted

This is a list of properties and districts in Spalding County, Georgia that are listed on the National Register of Historic Places (NRHP).

This National Park Service list is complete through NPS recent listings posted July 11, 2025.

== Current listings ==
	Name on the Register	Image	Date listed	Location	City or town	Description
1	Sam Bailey Building	Sam Bailey Building	March 20, 1973 (#73002144)	E. Poplar and 4th Sts. 33°14′47″N 84°15′35″W	Griffin	
2	Bailey-Tebault House	Bailey-Tebault House	March 20, 1973 (#73002146)	633 Meriwether St. 33°14′39″N 84°16′25″W	Griffin	Now houses the Griffin/Spalding Historical Society.
3	Double Cabins	Double Cabins	March 7, 1973 (#73002147)	NE of Griffin on GA 16 (3335 Jackson Road); 33°17′38″N 84°11′36″W	Griffin	
4	Griffin Commercial Historic District	Griffin Commercial Historic District	November 16, 1988 (#88002310)	Roughly bounded by Central Alley, Sixth, Taylor and Eighth Sts. 33°14′57″N 84°15′51″W	Griffin	Building on N. Hill St. (GA 155) and E Solomon St. Built in 1894
5	Hawkes Library	Hawkes Library	March 20, 1973 (#73002140)	210 S. 6th St. 33°14′47″N 84°15′40″W	Griffin	
6	Hill-Kurtz House	Hill-Kurtz House	March 20, 1973 (#73002141)	570 S. Hill St. 33°14′08″N 84°15′45″W	Griffin	
7	Marian Apartments	Marian Apartments	September 10, 2007 (#07000936)	400 W. Poplar St. 33°14′44″N 84°16′09″W	Griffin	
8	Mills House	Mills House	October 18, 1972 (#72001468)	406 N. Hill St. 33°15′14″N 84°15′47″W	Griffin	
9	Mills House and Smokehouse		January 20, 1980 (#80004308)	S of Griffin at 1590 Carver Rd. 33°12′34″N 84°17′44″W	Griffin	
10	Milner-Walker House	Milner-Walker House	December 19, 2019 (#100004786)	708 South Hill St. 33°14′09″N 84°15′51″W	Griffin	
11	Old Gaissert Homeplace	Old Gaissert Homeplace	June 4, 1973 (#73002145)	NE of Williamson on GA 362; 33°12′30″N 84°20′00″W	Williamson	Historic "Place in Peril" in 2025 list
12	Old Medical College Historical Area	Old Medical College Historical Area	December 15, 1972 (#72001469)	223-233 E. Broadway St. 33°15′04″N 84°15′40″W	Griffin	
13	Pritchard-Moore-Goodrich House	Pritchard-Moore-Goodrich House	March 7, 1973 (#73002143)	441 N. Hill St. 33°15′18″N 84°15′51″W	Griffin	
14	Spalding County Courthouse-Spalding County Jail	Spalding County Courthouse-Spalding County Jail	November 22, 2000 (#00001389)	232 E. Broad St. 33°14′59″N 84°15′38″W	Griffin	
15	St. George's Episcopal Church	St. George's Episcopal Church	April 7, 1994 (#94000284)	132 N. Tenth St. 33°14′59″N 84°16′06″W	Griffin	

== Former listings ==
	Name on the Register	Image	Date listed	Date removed	Location	City or town	Description
1	Hunt House		March 26, 1973 (#73002142)	July 10, 2024	232 S. 8th St. 33°15′44″N 84°18′59″W	Griffin	Moved from 232 S. 8th St. in 1978
