= Timothy Dwight Mills House =

Historic house in Connecticut, United States

- U.S. National Register of Historic Places
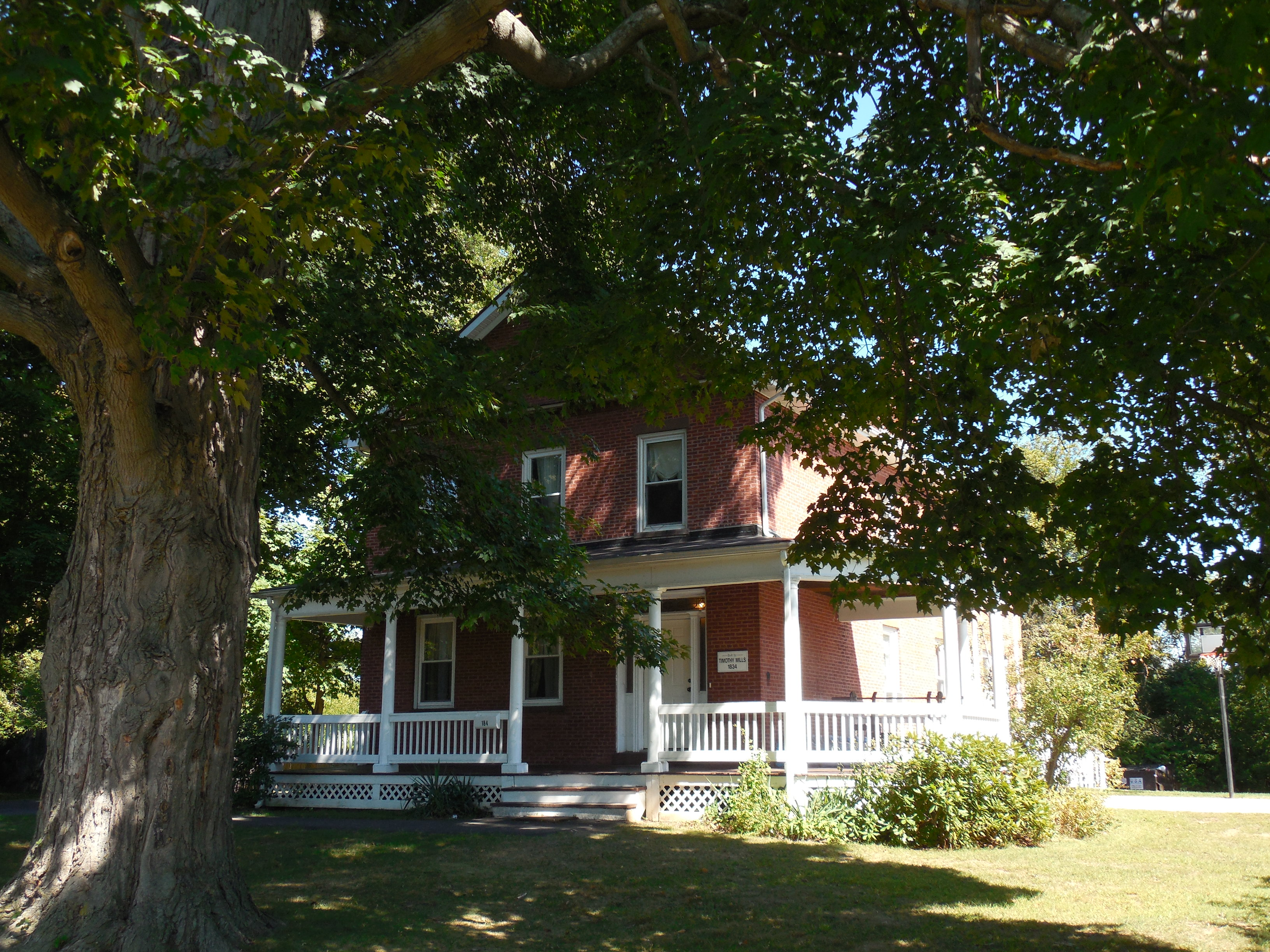

- Location within Connecticut Location within the United States
- Location: 184 Deerfield Road, Windsor, Connecticut
- Coordinates: 41°49′20″N 72°39′11″W
- Area: less than one acre
- Built: 1833
- Architectural style: Greek Revival, Federal
- MPS: 18th and 19th Century Brick Architecture of Windsor TR
- NRHP reference No.: 88001481
- Added to NRHP: September 15, 1988

The Timothy Dwight Mills House is a historic house at 184 Deerfield Road in Windsor, Connecticut. Built about 1833, it is a well-preserved local example of transitional Federal/Greek Revival architecture executed in brick. It was listed on the National Register of Historic Places in 1988.

== Description and history ==
The Timothy Dwight Mills House is located on Southern Windsor, on the east side of Deerfield Road, at one time the major north–south route on the West Side of the Connecticut River. The house is 2 1/2 stories in height, built out of locally made red brick, with a front-facing gabled roof. The front facade is three bays wide, with the main entrance in the right bay, framed by sidelight windows and a transom. Windows are set in rectangular openings, with stone sills and lintels. The front gable is fully pedimented. A single-story porch extends across the front and around part of the right side, with Tuscan columns supporting a modest entablature. There is a two-story brick ell extending to the rear.

The house was built about 1833 by Timothy Dwight Mills, a farmer whose family owned a local brickyard. (The houses of Mills' brothers, the Elijah Mills House and the Oliver W. Mills House, also still stand on Deerfield Street.) The only major alteration to the building exterior is the addition of the porch, which was probably done in the 1920s.

== See also ==
- National Register of Historic Places listings in Windsor, Connecticut
