= Fort Marshall =

Former United States fort in Baltimore, Maryland, US

- Baltimore, Maryland
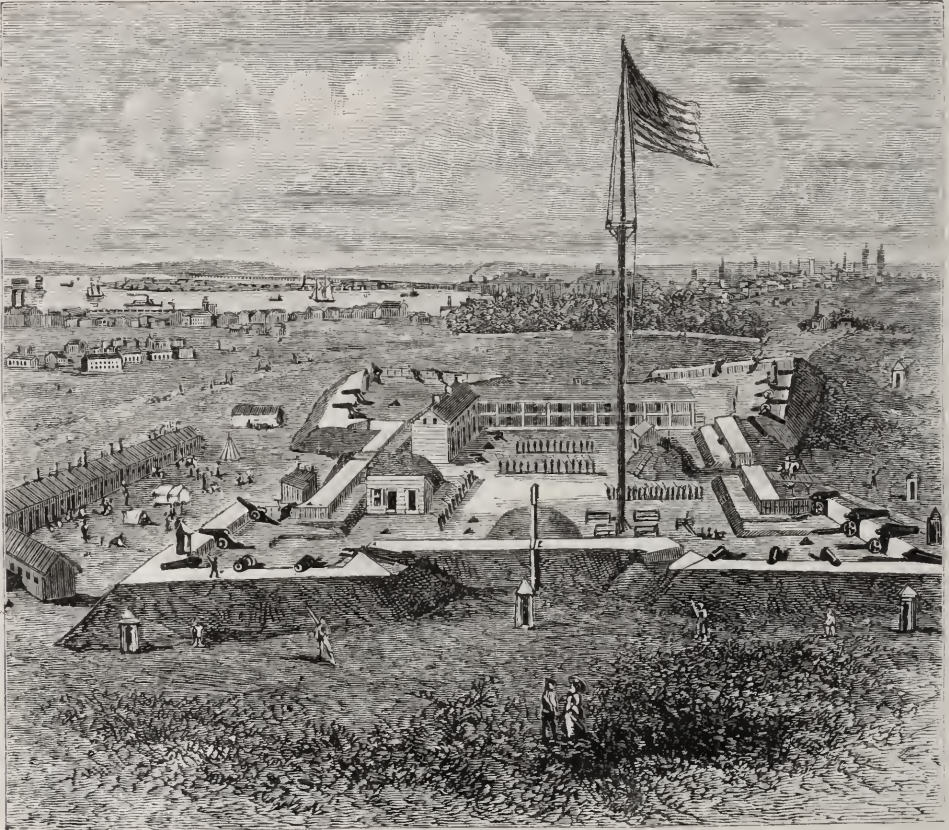
- Fort Marshall in 1863

Site information
- Type: Bastion fort
- Owner: United States Army

Site history
- Built: 1861
- Built by: 7th Maine Volunteer Infantry Regiment
- In use: 1861-1866
- Materials: Earth & timber
- Fate: Demolished 1866, Redeveloped as a Catholic Church 1873
- Events: Defense of Baltimore, part of the American Civil War

Garrison information
- Garrison: 400 capacity

Fort Marshall was a historical American coastal four-point bastion fort located in what is now the Highlandtown and Canton neighborhoods of Baltimore, Maryland. It was built at the outset of the American Civil War in 1861, to protect the eastern approaches to Baltimore from Confederate attacks. The fort remained garrisoned for the duration of the war. After 1866, the fort's buildings were salvaged for other purposes and the area ultimately became the site of the Sacred Heart of Jesus Roman Catholic Church, surrounded by the developing residential neighborhoods of southeast Baltimore.

== Establishment ==
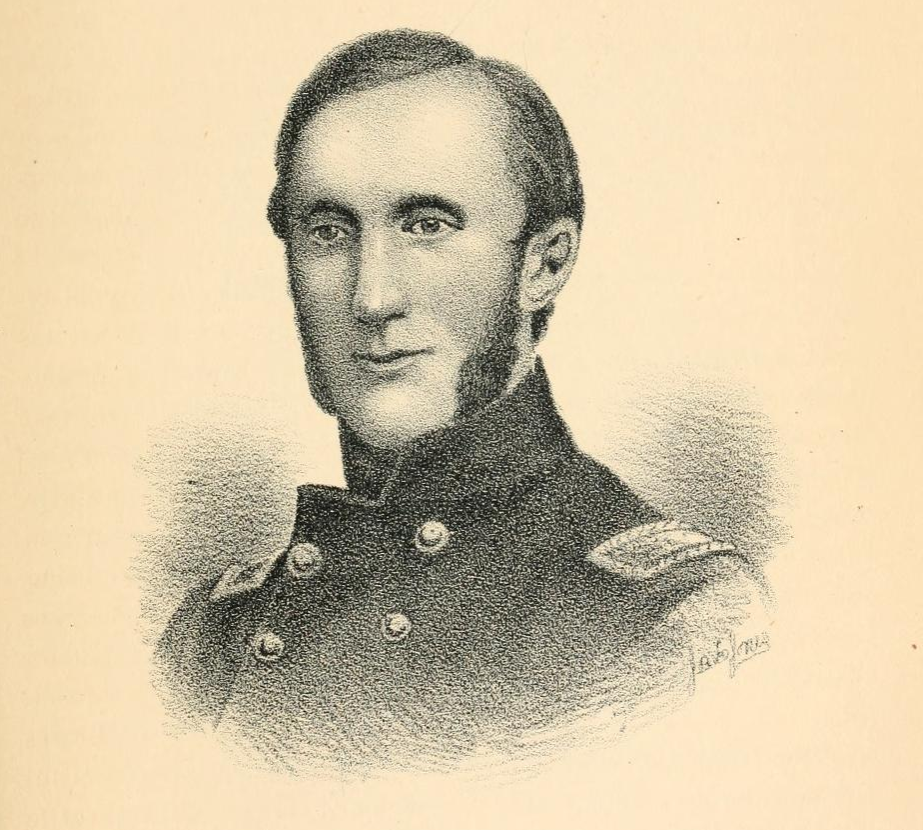
The fort was named for deceased Col. Thomas H. Marshall of the 7th Maine Volunteer Infantry Regiment

After hostilities broke out between the United States and the Confederacy in 1861, Lt. Col. Henry Brewerton of the Union Army was charged in August of that year with strengthening the defenses of Baltimore. The extant Fort McHenry and Fort Carroll were found to be dilapidated and inadequate to the city's protection. Brewerton launched a refurbishment of these fortifications, and established many new forts, such as Forts Federal Hill and Worthington. Lines of elaborate barricades on every approach to the city, and homes fortified for the occupancy of riflemen and sharpshooters demonstrated the military's commitment to holding the city at all costs, or at least denying it to the Confederates. The number of Union installations in the city was such that the army had "transformed Baltimore into something just short of a military base."

A key part of Brewerton's extensive defensive plan for the city, Fort Marshall was established on "Snake Hill," in a still rural area east of the city border. This site, also known as "Murray Hill" or "Potter's Hill," was located approximately a mile and a half from the city center, and was on higher ground than Fort McHenry, allowing its guns to survey a wider area. Designed as a four-pointed star fort, Fort Marshall was built principally by the 7th Maine Volunteer Infantry Regiment in the fall of 1861, and named for Colonel Thomas H. Marshall. Marshall had been an officer in the Maine 7th, but died at Baltimore shortly before, on October 25, 1861. The encampment outside the walls of the fort structure proper was known as Camp Emory, named for Union General Emory Upton. Armed with thirty-three heavy artillery pieces, the fort operated in tandem with Fort McHenry, which sat on the opposite side of Baltimore's Northwest Harbor. By war's end, its gun complement would further increase to 60 pieces. The fort also boasted a barracks capable of housing 400 soldiers, with a fully subterranean magazine.

== History ==
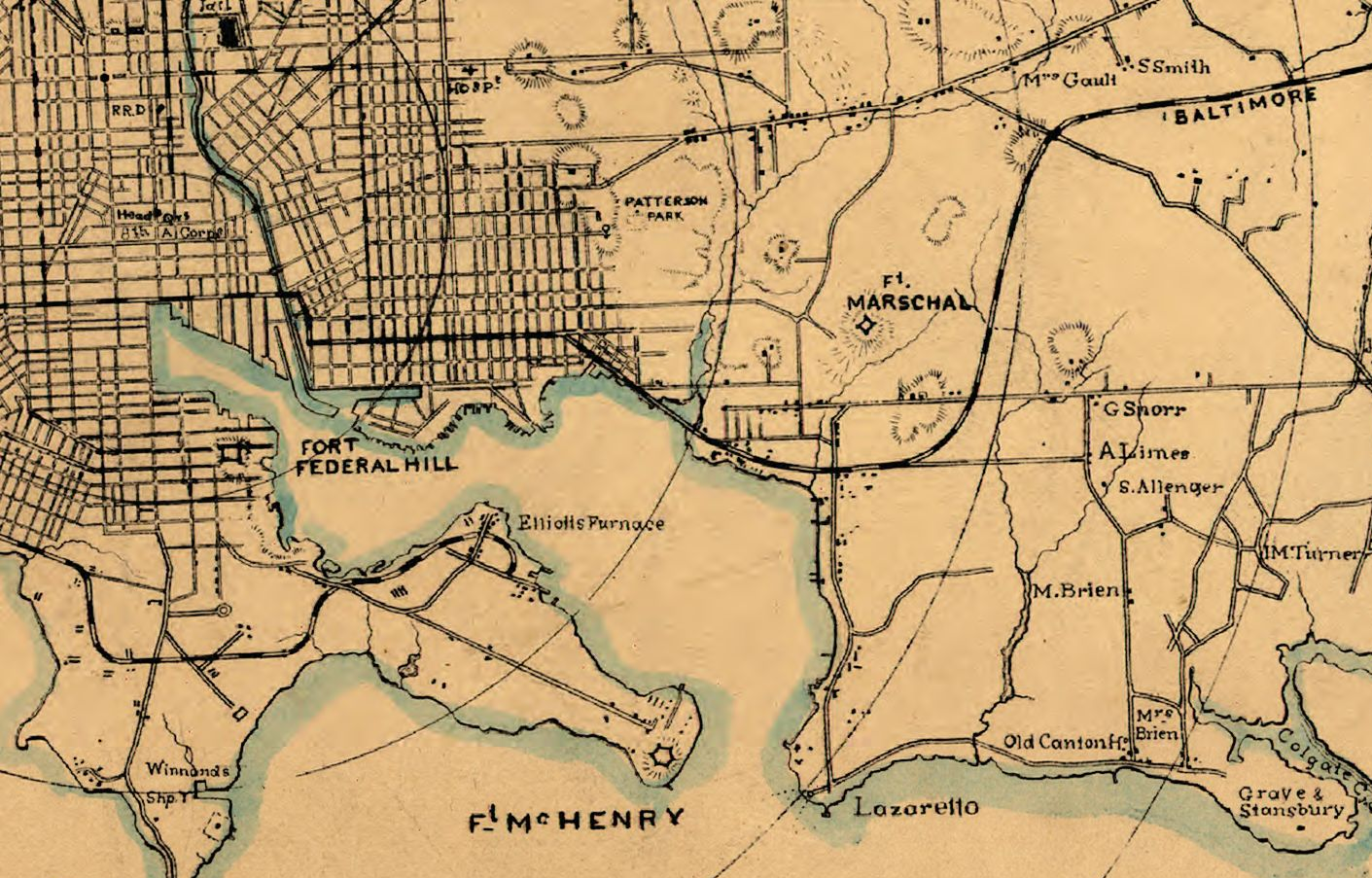
"Ft. Marschal (sic)" overlooking the harbor in an 1862 map, with Forts Federal Hill & McHenry across the water.

Fort Marshall was considered one of Baltimore's more important defenses during the war. Its strong earthwork fortifications were positioned near to the center of the city. There it protected the eastern flank of the city, along with nearby Fort Worthington, from the threat of Confederate raid or invasion. Fort Marshall also shielded the Union military hospital at nearby Patterson Park, half a mile to the west. In addition, as the riots of April 1861 had proven, Baltimore itself was hardly a bastion of Union sympathizers, and so the fortifications served the dual role of enforcing the compliance of hostile Baltimoreans within, while protecting the city from Confederate attack from without. To this end, units from the Fort conducted regular patrols and drills in the city proper, for the purpose of, as one contemporary Union account put it, "reminding the city rebels that their masters were not far away." Celebrations of the Fourth of July at the forts of Baltimore involved large artillery salutes, both to commemorate the day as well as to serve as a "gentle reminder to the Secesh [secessionists] of that city that Fort Marshall was prepared for any emergency." Patrols from the fort also guarded lines and bridges along the Baltimore and Philadelphia Railroad after several bridges had been burned by saboteurs. Detachments from the fort were sent to various towns in Maryland's Eastern Shore in order to defend the polls during the 1864 United States elections, when pro-Union voters were facing voter intimidation. Troops were also sent on raids of nearby warehouses suspected of dealing in contraband or goods intended for smuggling to the South. One such incident uncovered a stock of gunpowder, bowie knives and short rifled muskets, worth at least $4000 (equivalent to $129,000 in 2025) in a stash below Canton.

=== Life at the fort ===
Service at Fort Marshall (as well as the other fortifications and encampments around Baltimore) served as useful and conveniently-supplied training camps for recently raised Union regiments, prior to their deployment to active theaters. Reports from soldiers stationed there described service at Fort Marshall as "rather monotonous," but that they enjoyed the "greater privileges and more liberty than had been allowed in Fort McHenry." The fort's reputation for placidity was such that the 5th New York Heavy Artillery Regiment was able to offer "many inducements" in a recruitment advertisement in the Brooklyn Daily Eagle in 1862: "no long toilsome marches, no exposure in damp cold tents. Good warm and comfortable barracks in a healthy locality, provided for each man." Despite the relative peace of the post, it was subject to occasional night raids from Confederacy-aligned attackers, but without great effect or losses to the garrison. Diseases were also a frequent issue within the barracks. What casualties did occur were mostly the result of periodic weapons accidents. One dramatic instance was that of Commander Woodhall of the Navy, whose body was flung 30 feet when he walked in front of a firing artillery piece, part of a salute for the tour of visiting army brass including Major General Benjamin Butler.

== Decline and abandonment ==
The defenses at Fort Marshall were never seriously called upon for the duration of the war. By late 1864, the site was primarily used only as a hospital. Visitors in May of that year noted the 'dilapidated' nature of its buildings. In November 1865, with the Civil War now over, Capt. William Price Craighill was named the replacement for Lt. Col. Brewerton, and set about making upkeep repairs at Fort Marshall, which remained a military installation. Half a year later however, plans had changed, and the Chief of Ordnance announced in May 1866 that the stocks of the fort would be sold at cash auction, including nearly 3,000 kegs of rifle powder, almost 10,000 cartridges of cannon powder, and many gun carriages and chassis. Four days after the auction, the Ordnance sergeant and quartermasters themselves were either reassigned or discharged. By July, even the fort's buildings were being sold off as firewood. Much of the building's lumber was salvaged by the Freedmen's Bureau, which used the material from Marshall and nearby Hicks U.S. Army General Hospital to construct more than sixty new schoolhouses. The fort was so thoroughly dismantled that an 1869 account described its outline on the horizon as "but a mark of the times gone by," where "the cows and goats now pasture on its green bastions and parapets."

The final abandonment of the site by the Federal government had cleared the way for the area to begin redevelopment as a residential district, which around 1870 became known as "Highland Town." A congregation of Baltimore German Redemptorists purchased the site of the former Fort Marshall in 1872-1873, and leveled the hill (which had given 'Highland Town' its name), building in its place the Sacred Heart of Jesus Roman Catholic Church. One final legacy of the Fort was the Fort Marshall Brewing Company, established in 1869 by George F. Wiesnner and located partly on the site of the fortifications, at Highland and Eastern avenues. It would operate until 1899, but established the southeast of Baltimore as a hub for German-American brewing operations, a trend which would continue a bit further east into what would become the "Brewer's Hill" region of the city.

== Garrisoned units ==
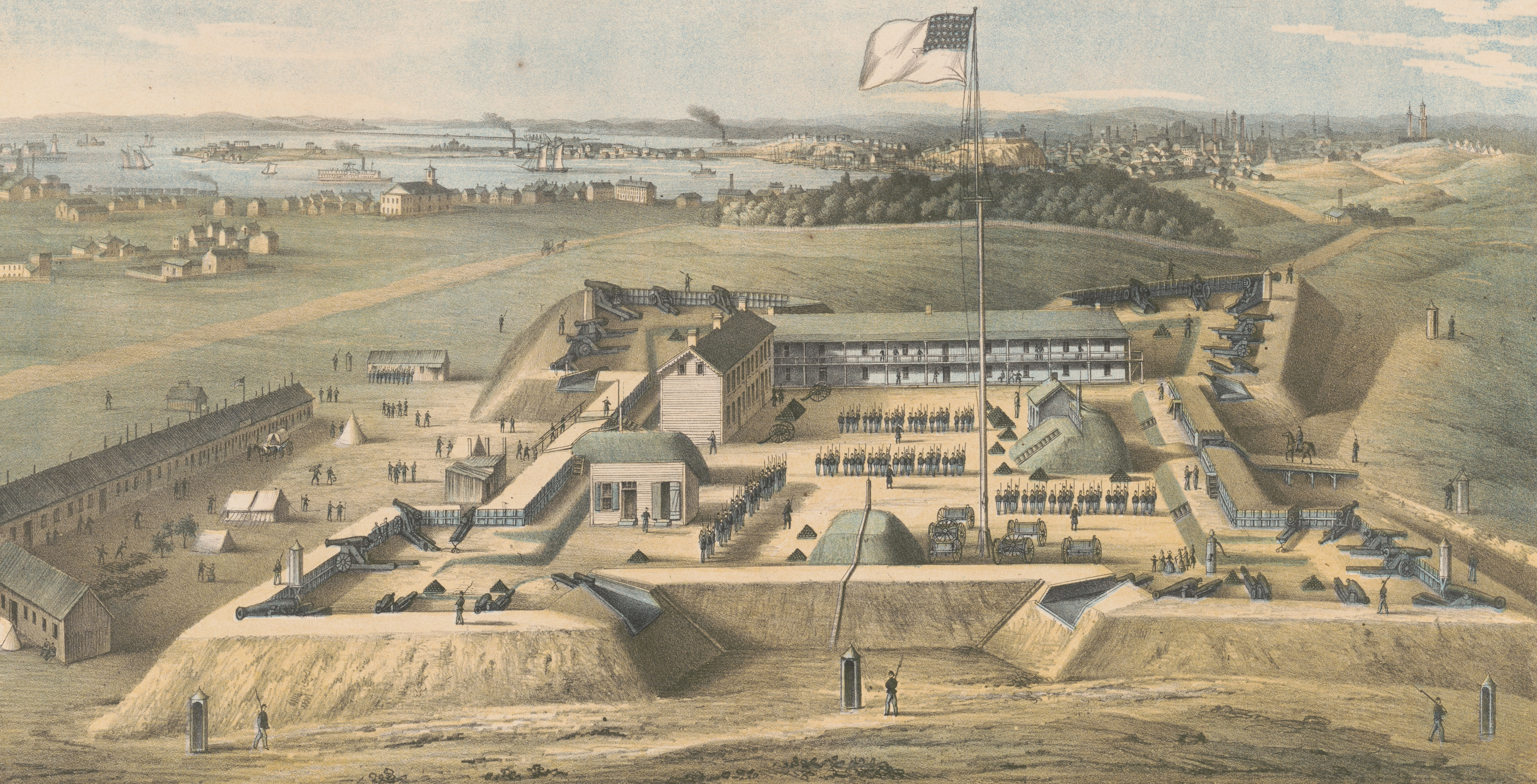
Lithograph of Fort Marshall ca.1862

- 17th Connecticut Infantry Regiment (1862)
- 18th Connecticut Infantry Regiment (1862-1863)
- 2nd Delaware Infantry Regiment (1862)
- 21st Regiment, Indiana Volunteer Infantry (1861-1862)
- 11th Indiana Infantry Regiment (Wallace's Zouaves) (1865)
- 7th Maine Volunteer Infantry Regiment (1861)
- 5th Regiment Massachusetts Volunteer Militia (1864)
- 17th Regiment Massachusetts Volunteer Infantry (1862)
- 18th Regiment Massachusetts Volunteer Infantry (1863)
- 5th New York Heavy Artillery Regiment (1862)
- 5th New York Volunteer Infantry (Duryée's Zouaves) (1862)
- 8th New York Heavy Artillery Regiment (1863)
- 7th New York Militia (1863)
- 17th Regiment New York National Guard Infantry (1863)
- 18th Regiment New York National Guard Infantry (1863)
- 19th Regiment New York National Guard Infantry (1862)
- 150th New York Volunteer Infantry Regiment (1862-1863)
- 131st Ohio Infantry (1864)
- 137th Ohio Infantry (1864)
