= Old Gaissert Homeplace =

Historic house in Georgia, United States

- U.S. National Register of Historic Places
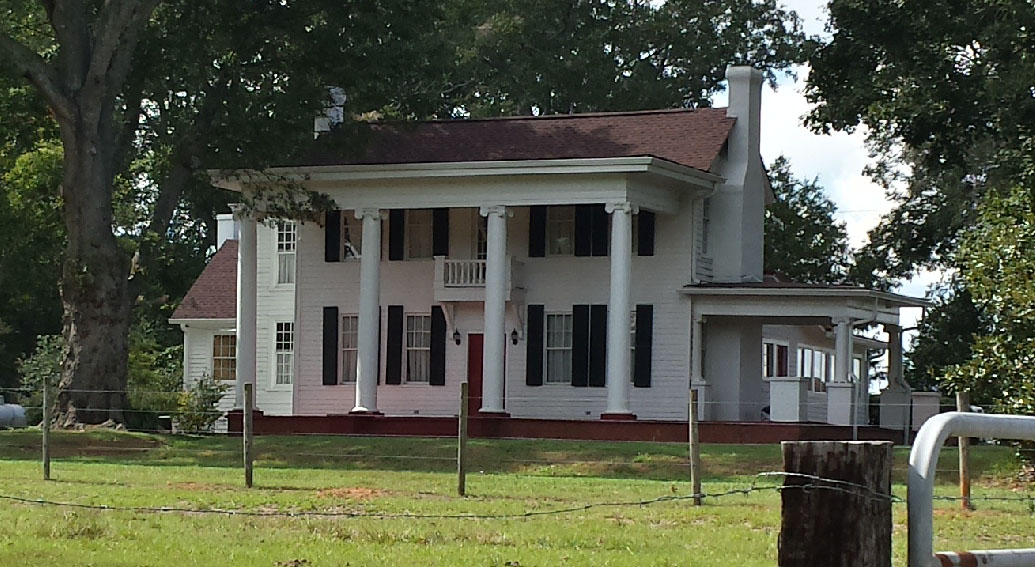

- Location within Georgia Location within the United States
- Nearest city: Williamson, Georgia
- Coordinates: 33.20834°N 84.33337°W
- Area: 86 acres (35 ha)
- Built: 1910
- NRHP reference No.: 73002145
- Added to NRHP: June 4, 1973

The Old Gaissert Homeplace, also known as Orr-Williamson-Gaissert Homeplace, Williamson Place, or Mary Brook Farm, is a historic building in Williamson, Georgia. It was originally built in 1827 and added to the National Register of Historic Places on June 4, 1973. It is located northeast of Williamson on Georgia State Route 362. The property owners won a 2002 Georgia Centennial Farm Award for family farmers preserving historic properties.

In 2025 The Georgia Trust for Historic Preservation placed this site on the list of places in Peril.

From the Trust: "Following the recent passing of the last family member without heirs to inherit the property, it was sold to a developer. The developer’s plans to transform the site into a commercial development threaten to erase the property’s historic integrity and its longstanding connection to the local community."

== See also ==
- National Register of Historic Places listings in Spalding County, Georgia
- The Georgia Trust for Historic Preservation - Gaissert Homeplace
