= 131st Ohio Infantry Regiment =

- Active: May – August 1864
- Country: United States of America
- Allegiance: Union
- Branch: Ohio National Guard
- Type: Infantry
- Role: garrison and guard duty
- Size: 871 soldiers at outset of the war
- Engagements: none

The 131st Ohio Infantry Regiment, sometimes 131st Regiment, Ohio Volunteer Infantry (or 131st OVI) was an infantry regiment in the Union Army during the American Civil War.

== History ==
The 131st OVI was mustered into the service at Camp Chase in Columbus on May 14, 1864, as an Ohio National Guard unit. It was a part of the Hundred Days Regiments commissioned by Ohio Governor John Brough as rear guard troops in an effort to free up veteran regiments for front-line combat duty in an all-out effort to seize Richmond, Virginia, and hasten the end of the war. Its commander was Col. John G. Lowe.

On May 15, the new regiment traveled by train to Baltimore, Maryland, where it was assigned to the Second Separate Brigade of the VIII Corps. The 131st never saw any combat. Instead, it primarily served on garrison duty at Fort McHenry, then at Fort Marshall and Federal Hill. Detachments served at Washington, D.C., Harpers Ferry, West Virginia, Fortress Monroe, and City Point, Virginia. On August 19 the regiment was ordered to return to Ohio because the soldiers were nearing the end of their short term of enlistment. The 865 remaining men mustered out at Camp Chase on August 25, 1864. The 131st Regiment lost two enlisted men by disease during its service, though others would succumb to complications of malaria in the years following.

== See also ==
- Ohio in the Civil War
