= Lewis H. Mills House =

Lewis H. Mills House may refer to:

- Lewis H. Mills House (1916), Portland, Oregon, listed on the National Register of Historic Places in Northwest Portland, Oregon
- Lewis H. Mills House (1929), Portland, Oregon, listed on the National Register of Historic Places in Multnomah County, Oregon

== See also ==
- Mills House (disambiguation)
