= Alfred T. Goshorn =

American businessman (1833–1902)

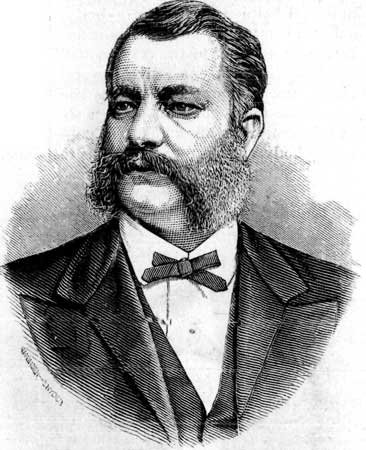
- Portrait of Goshorn, c. 1876
- Born: Alfred Traber Goshorn; July 15, 1833; Cincinnati, Ohio, U.S.
- Died: February 19, 1902 (aged 68)
- Education: Woodward College; Marietta College; Cincinnati Law School
- Occupations: Lawyer; businessman
- Spouse: Lorenia Cutter

Alfred Traber Goshorn (July 15, 1833 – February 19, 1902) was a Cincinnati, Ohio, businessman and booster who served as director-general of the 1876 Centennial Exposition in Philadelphia. That was the first world's fair in the United States and so resounding a success that Queen Victoria knighted Goshorn and the leaders of Europe presented him with numerous accolades.

== Biography ==
Alfred Traber Goshorn was born on July 15, 1833, in Cincinnati to Nicholas Goshorn. He attended Woodward College from 1848 to 1849. He graduated from Marietta College in 1854 and earned a law degree in 1857 from Cincinnati Law School. During the Civil War he enlisted in Company F, 137th Ohio Infantry, a 100 days service regiment, serving as captain. He never saw combat, having served as an officer at a Union prisoner of war camp, near Baltimore, Maryland. After the Civil War, he owned a paint company and led the Cincinnati City Council for two years.

Goshorn had a law firm with Lewis Este Mills and Edward Mills called Mills & Goshorn. After the death of Edward Mills and retirement of Lewis Mills, he practiced law with Drausin Wulsin under the firm Goshorn & Wulsin. He remained with that firm until 1867 when he became the proprietor of the Anchor White Lead Works.

== Baseball ==
"New York style" baseball boomed in the United States after the end of the Civil War. Scattered clubs from as far away as Fort Leavenworth, Kansas sent delegates to the meeting of the game's national association in December 1865, roughly tripling membership from 30 to 90. The "Queen City of the West," Cincinnati was not represented, but at least two baseball clubs were formally constituted that season and one established ballclub officially adopted the New York game.

Alfred Goshorn was the first president of the Cincinnati Base Ball Club, established July 23, 1866. The Cincinnati club would rise to the pinnacle as parent of the first professional baseball team, the 1869 Cincinnati Red Stockings. Goshorn served until that April, just before the opening of the famous season, presiding over three years of evolution from strictly amateur local membership and noncommercial play, ending in full professionalism. Affiliating with the Union Cricket Club before its second season, the club thereby arranged to share playing grounds and the services of "club pro" Harry Wright. The two built a grandstand and modern enclosure, putting competitive matches on a commercial basis and making Union Grounds the physical center of cricket and baseball in Cincinnati (Ellard [1908]).

== Expositions and civic leadership ==
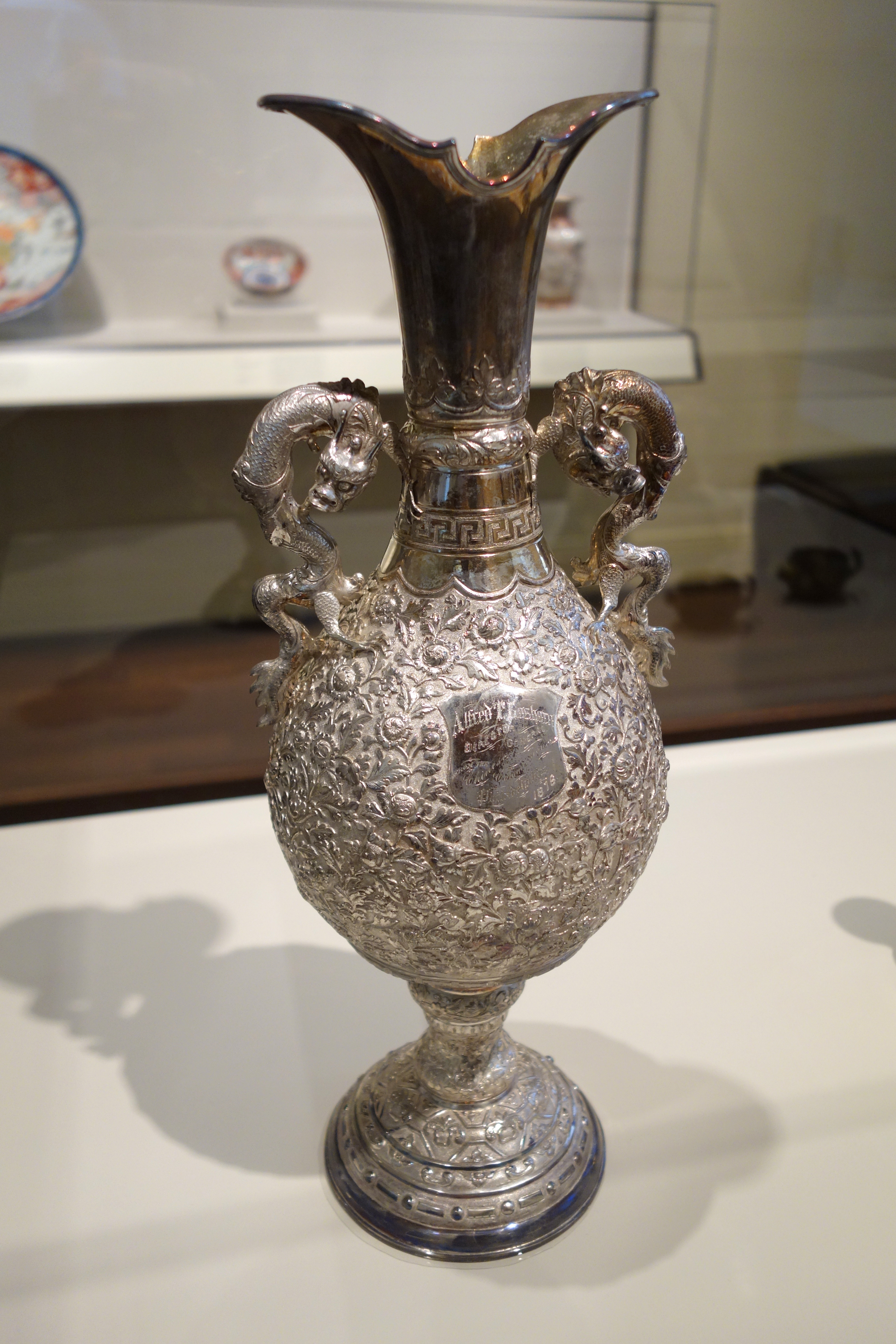
Trophy Vase presented to Alfred T. Goshorn, 1876 International Centennial Exposition

For two decades beginning in 1870, Goshorn organized the Cincinnati Industrial Expositions, public exhibitions of the arts and industry of Cincinnati people and companies. These local exhibitions grew to regional and occasionally national scope. "Goshorn became world famous for the expositions" according to the Ohio Historical Society (2005).

When planning for the Centennial Exposition began in 1873, Goshorn was appointed delegate from Ohio. Recognizing his achievement with the Cincinnati expos, the other delegates elected him Director-General. The World's Fair was a great success, attracting ten million visitors including thousands from Europe. Dignitaries celebrated the Director-General and Philadelphia presented him with hundreds of books, pamphlets, and photographs that had been on display, which now compose Goshorn's Centennial Collection at the Cincinnati Historical Society (Tolzmann n.d.).

"General Goshorn" returned to Cincinnati life as a civic leader, thereafter organizing the Cincinnati Art Museum as well as continuing the Cincinnati Expositions.

== Personal life ==
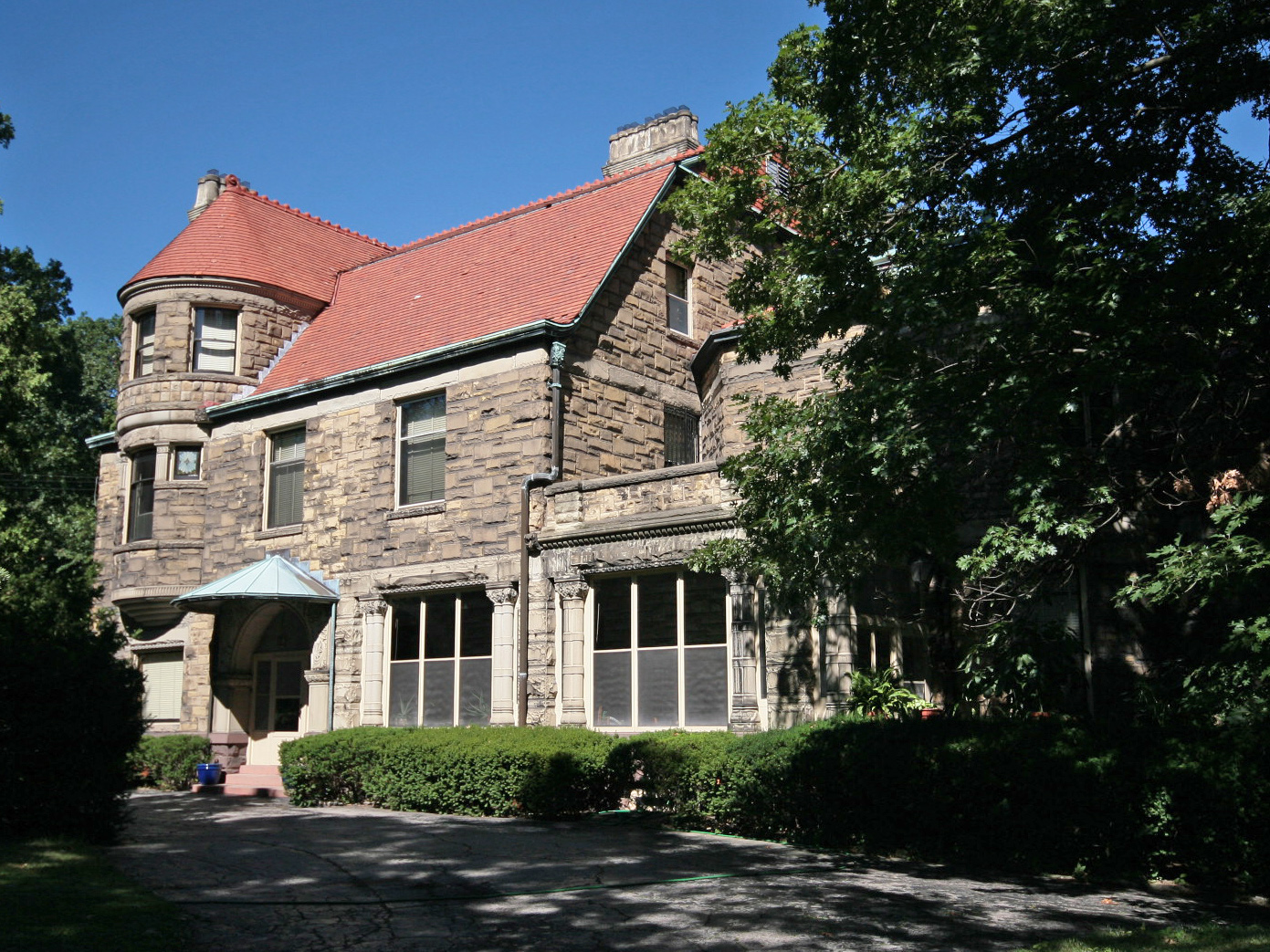
Goshorn's house in Clifton, Cincinnati

Goshorn married Lorenia Cutter, daughter of Seth Cutter. He died on February 19, 1902, at his home on Clifton Avenue in Cincinnati. His bequest to Marietta College financed A. T. Goshorn Gymnasium, opened in 1903.
