= Hill–Kurtz House =

Historic house in Georgia, United States

- U.S. National Register of Historic Places
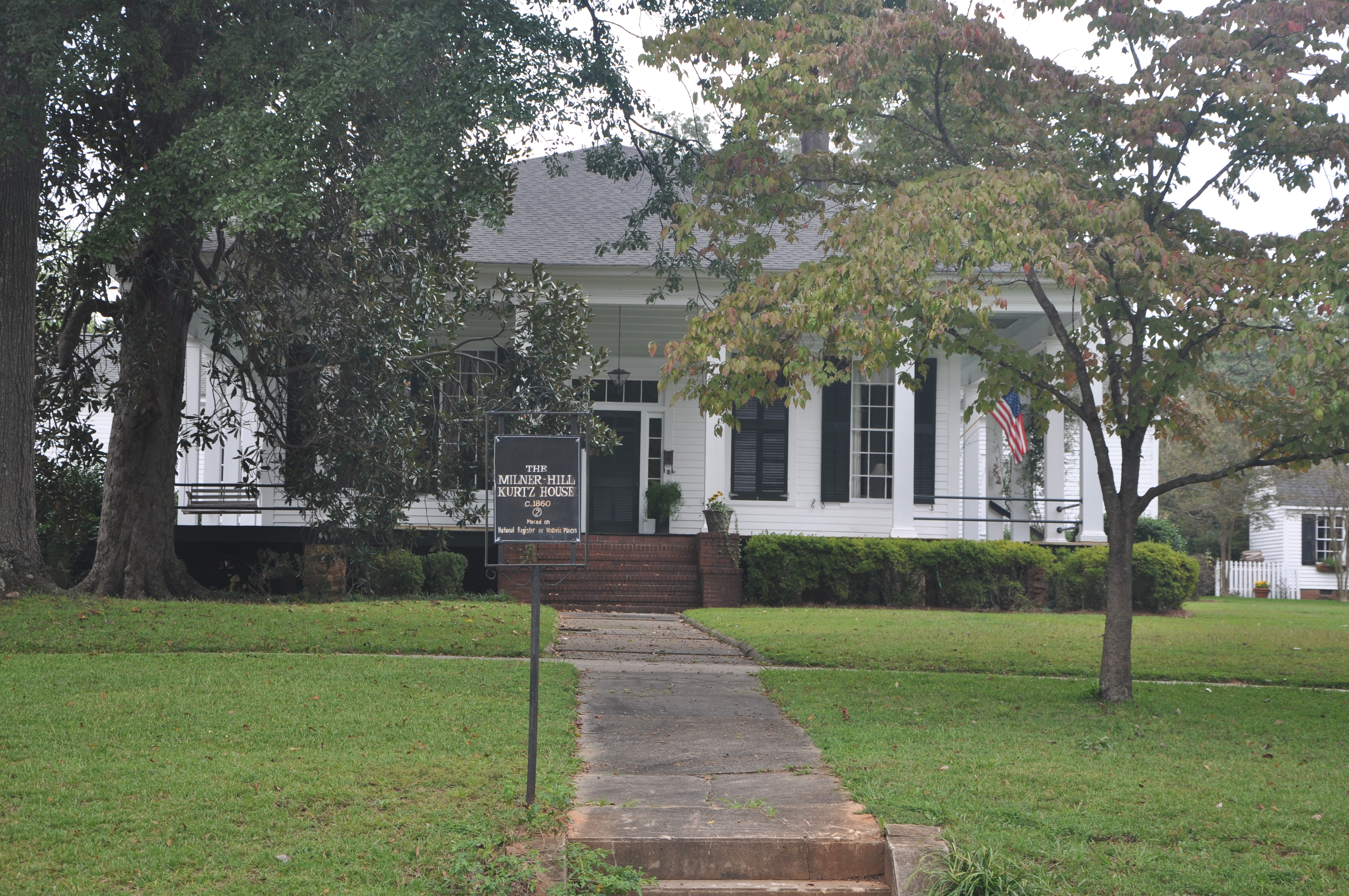

- Location within Georgia Location within the United States
- Location: 570 S. Hill St., Griffin, Georgia
- Coordinates: 33°14′8″N 84°15′45″W
- Area: 1 acre (0.40 ha)
- Built: 1860
- Built by: Gilman J. Drake
- Architectural style: Greek Revival
- NRHP reference No.: 73002141
- Added to NRHP: March 20, 1973

Hill–Kurtz House is a historic residence in Griffin, Georgia in Spalding County. It was added to the National Register of Historic Places on March 20, 1973. It is located at 570 South Hill Street. Built in 1860 for Benjamin J. Milner, who helped muster a cavalry unit from Spalding County during the American Civil War. H.P. Hill, a printer, bought the home in 1866.

== See also ==
- National Register of Historic Places listings in Spalding County, Georgia
