= Hunt House (Griffin, Georgia) =

Historic house in Georgia, United States

- Formerly listed on the U.S. National Register of Historic Places
- Location within Georgia
- Location: 232 S. 8th St., Griffin, Georgia
- Coordinates: 33°14′40″N 84°16′0″W
- Area: 1 acre (0.40 ha)
- Built: c.1860, c.1900
- Architectural style: Renaissance, Beaux Arts, Italianate
- NRHP reference No.: 73002142

Significant dates
- Added to NRHP: March 26, 1973
- Removed from NRHP: July 10, 2024

The Hunt House is a historic residence in Griffin, Spalding County, Georgia. Also known at the Chapman-Kincaid-Hunt House, it was added to the National Register of Historic Places in 1973 and removed in 2024. It was originally located at 232 South 8th Street.

It is a monumental Beaux Arts house that was built originally in c.1860 as an Italianate summer home for a rich south Georgia planter, W.W. Chapman.

It was remodelled into the Beaux Arts style by W.J. Kincaid, founder of a textile manufacturing firm in Griffin. Kincaid bought the house in 1874. His daughter, born in the house in 1875, married a Hunt and lived there until 1959. The house was moved to 525 North Pine Hill in 1978, apparently at 33.26214°N 84.31637°W.

== See also ==
- National Register of Historic Places listings in Spalding County, Georgia
