= Double Cabins =

Historic houses in Georgia, United States

- U.S. National Register of Historic Places
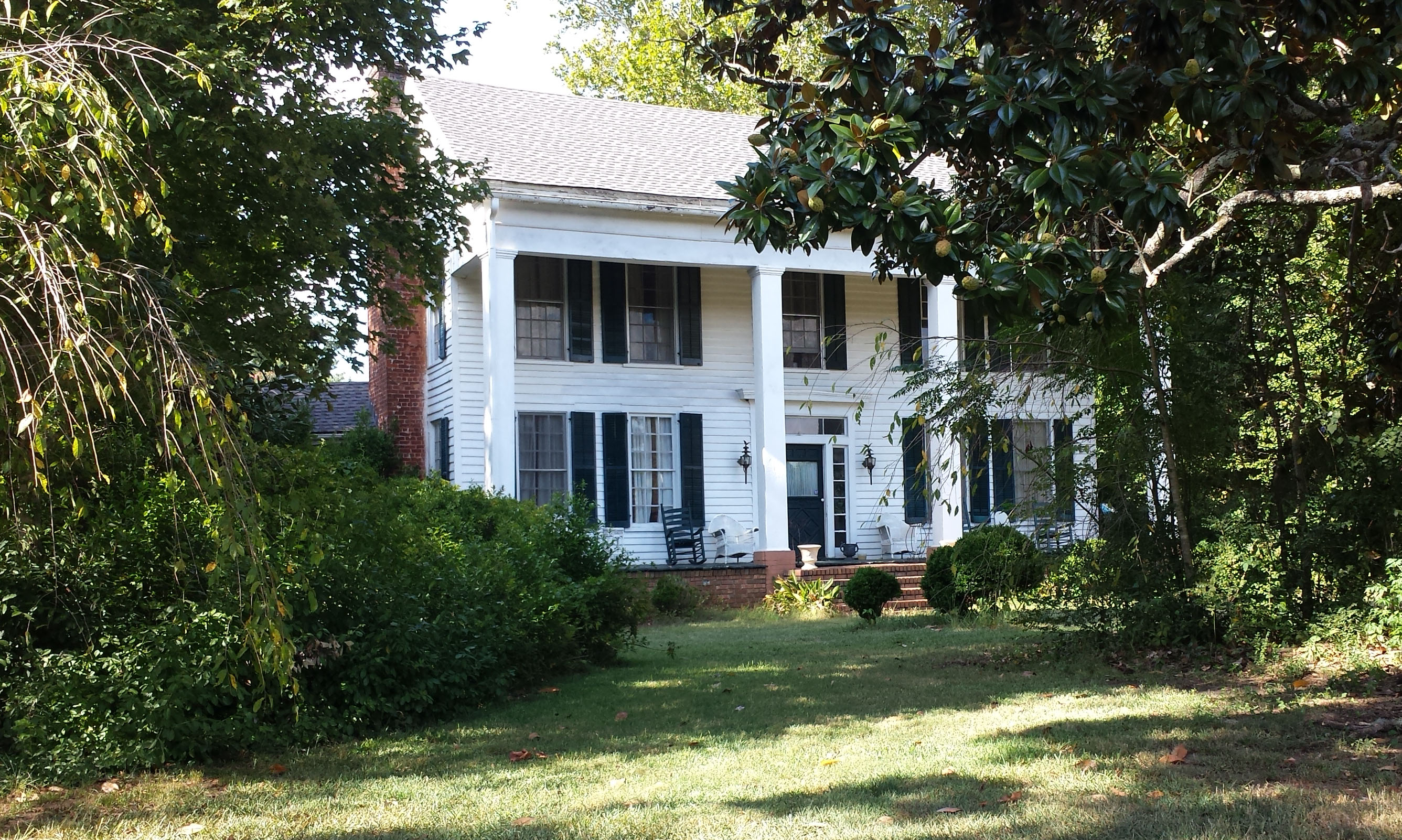

- Location within Georgia
- Nearest city: Griffin, Georgia
- Coordinates: 33.29384°N 84.19322°W
- Area: 112 acres (45 ha)
- Built: 1842
- Architectural style: Greek Revival, Greek revival vernacular
- NRHP reference No.: 73002147
- Added to NRHP: March 7, 1973

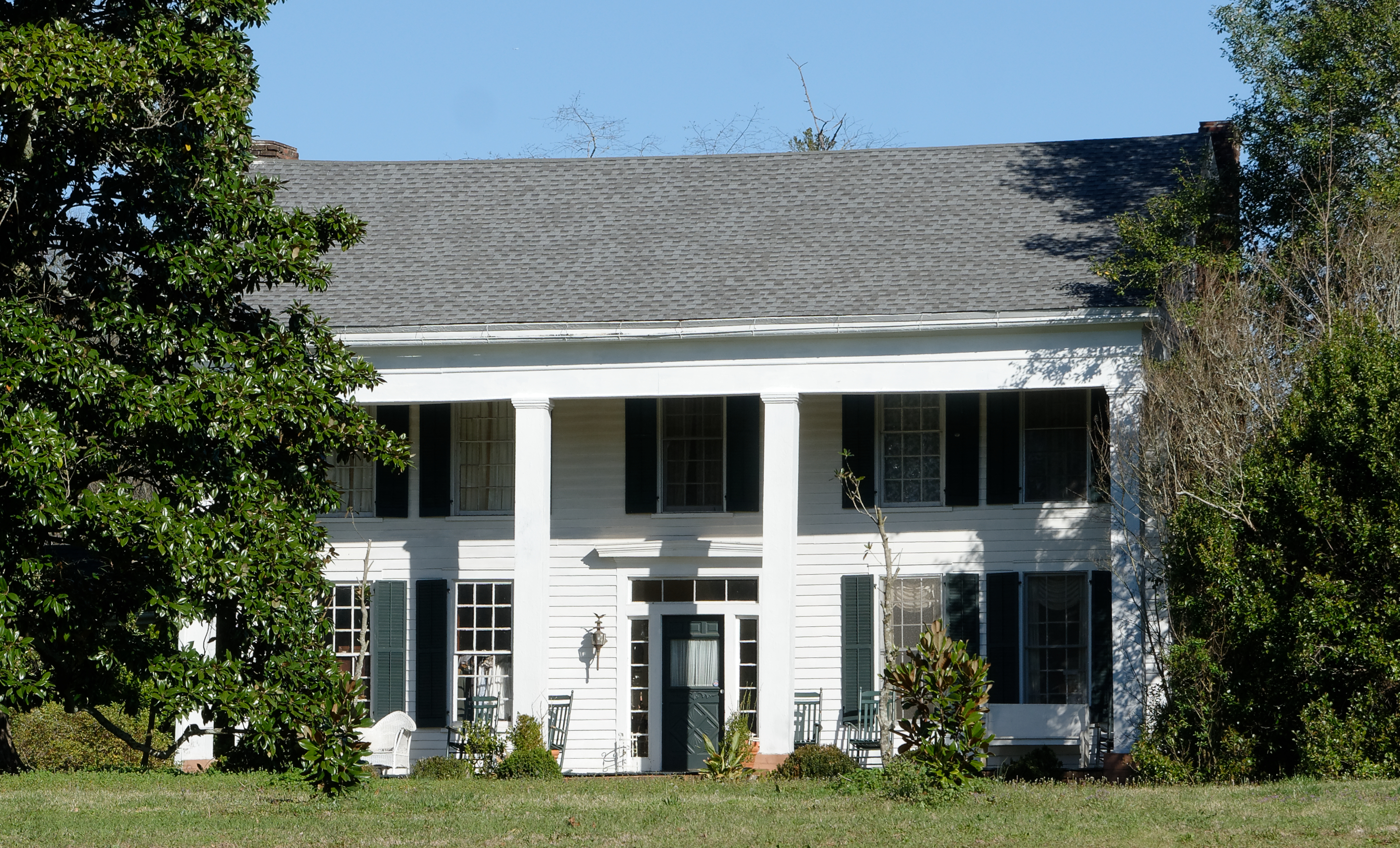
The house in 2018

Double Cabins, also known as Mitchell-Walker-Hollberg House, is a historic site outside Griffin, Georgia in Spalding County, Georgia. The site was added to the National Register of Historic Places on March 7, 1973. It is located northeast of Griffin on Georgia State Route 155, at 3335 Jackson Road.

The Greek Revival house, built in 1842, was named "Double Cabins" because that was the name of the stage coach stop across the road. The house was built by Shatteen Mitchell and "is a good example of the provincial adaptation of Greek Revival forms to an upcountry Georgia plantation home."

== See also ==
- National Register of Historic Places listings in Spalding County, Georgia
