= Fort Carroll Light =

Lighthouse in Maryland, United States

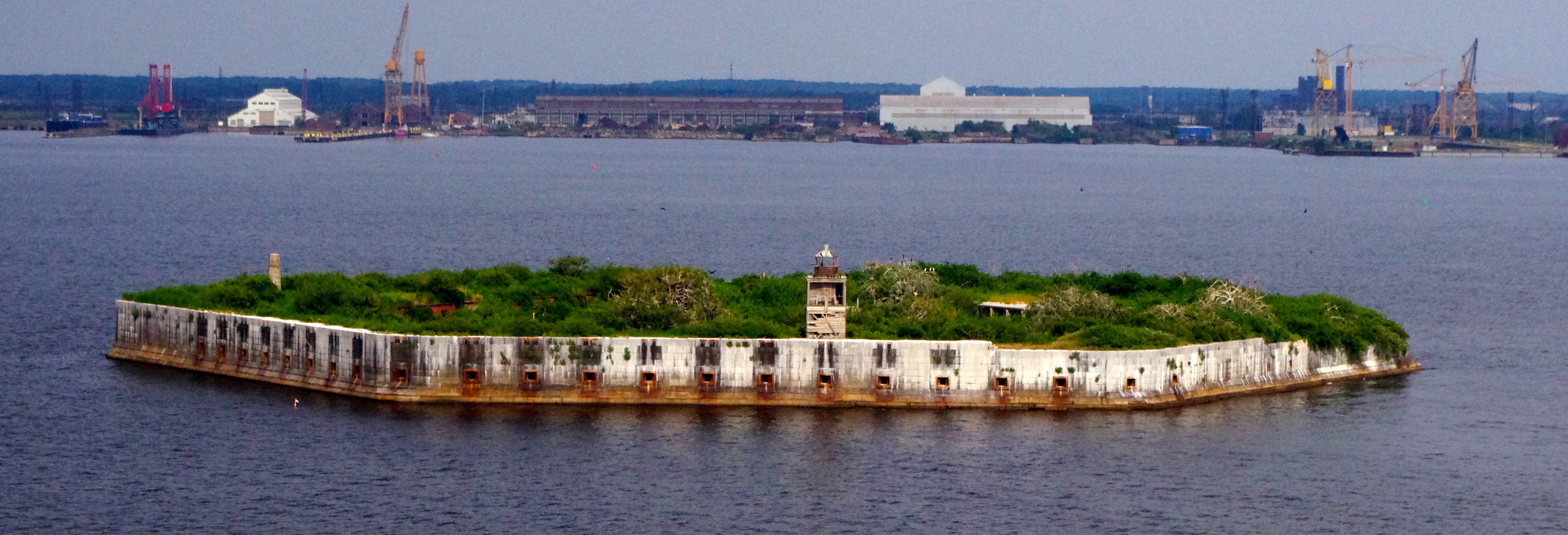
- Fort Carroll in 2016
- Location: Fort Carroll in Baltimore, Maryland harbor approach
- Coordinates: 39°12′52.92″N 76°31′11.64″W

Tower
- Construction: wood frame
- Automated: 1920
- Shape: square tower on fort walls

Light
- First lit: 1854 (current structure 1900)
- Deactivated: 1964

Fort Carroll Light is a derelict lighthouse consisting of a short wooden tower on the walls of its namesake fortifications in the Patapsco River.

== History ==
The construction of Fort Carroll beginning in 1847 set a large new hazard to navigation immediately adjacent to the ship channel, and a keeper's house with a light tower on it was constructed in 1854. At the time, the light keeper was the only resident of the artificial island.

The fort was never completed as envisioned, but nonetheless changes to the fortifications brought about a number of changes to the light. The tower was moved to the southwest corner of the fort in 1875, and a new keeper's house was built in 1888. The Spanish–American War prompted a project to upgrade the fort's guns to (then) modern naval weapons, and this displaced the light to a new location on the northwest corner. In 1900 the tower was moved again to a more central location on the western wall. This tower, a short square wooden structure with a fog bell, survives to this day.

The fort was strategically obsolete almost before construction began, and the army finally abandoned the fort in 1921, one year after the light was automated. The federal government retained the property, however, and the coast guard used it for a pistol range and for temporary quarters for seamen whose ships were being fumigated. By this time the light had been discontinued. Various schemes for reuse ensued, and eventually in 1958 the property was sold to Benjamin Eisenberg, a Baltimore lawyer who intended to build a casino there. Jurisdictional issues nixed this, and the property has never been put to commercial use, though at one point a large number of peach trees were planted. In its neglect the fort has become a seabird refuge, by default. The light remains perched on the fortress walls, but in extreme disrepair.
