= David Demarest =

David Demarest may refer to:

- David D. Demarest (1819–1898), American clergyman
- David P. Demarest (1931–2011), American academic
- David Demarest (politician)
- David Demarest (builder) (1811–1879), American builder of Old Spalding County Courthouse, Griffin, Georgia and other notable buildings
