= Lewis Mill (Telluride, Colorado) =

- U.S. National Register of Historic Places
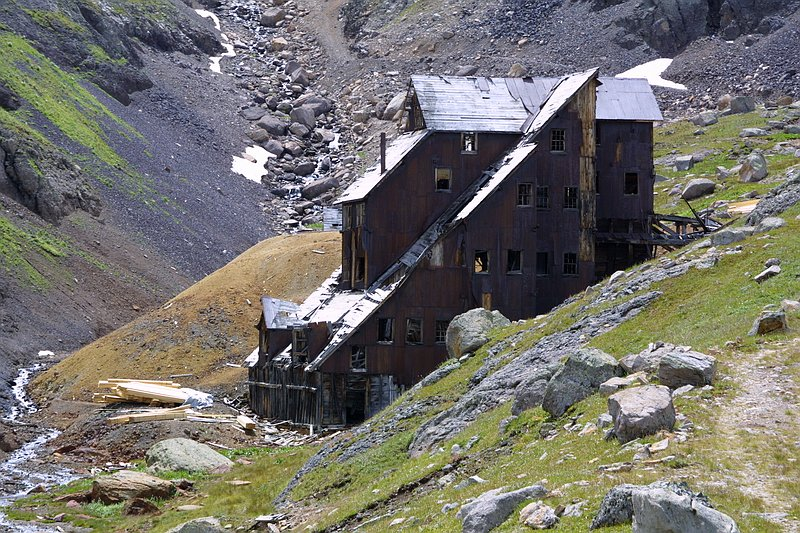

- Location within Colorado
- Nearest city: Telluride, Colorado
- Coordinates: 37°52′44″N 107°46′30″W
- Area: less than one acre
- Built: 1910
- Built by: Maxwell, Charles
- MPS: Mining Industry in Colorado, MPS
- NRHP reference No.: 09000267
- Added to NRHP: May 6, 2009

The Lewis Mill, near Telluride, Colorado, was built in 1910. It was listed on the National Register of Historic Places in 2009.

It is located 3.5 miles (5.6 km) southeast of Telluride at the head of Bridal Veil Basin, at 12,450 ft. elevation.

It is a 60-ton capacity ore concentration mill.

== See also ==
- Matterhorn Mill, a full flotation mill, also NRHP-listed in San Miguel County
