= Sam Bailey Building =

- U.S. National Register of Historic Places
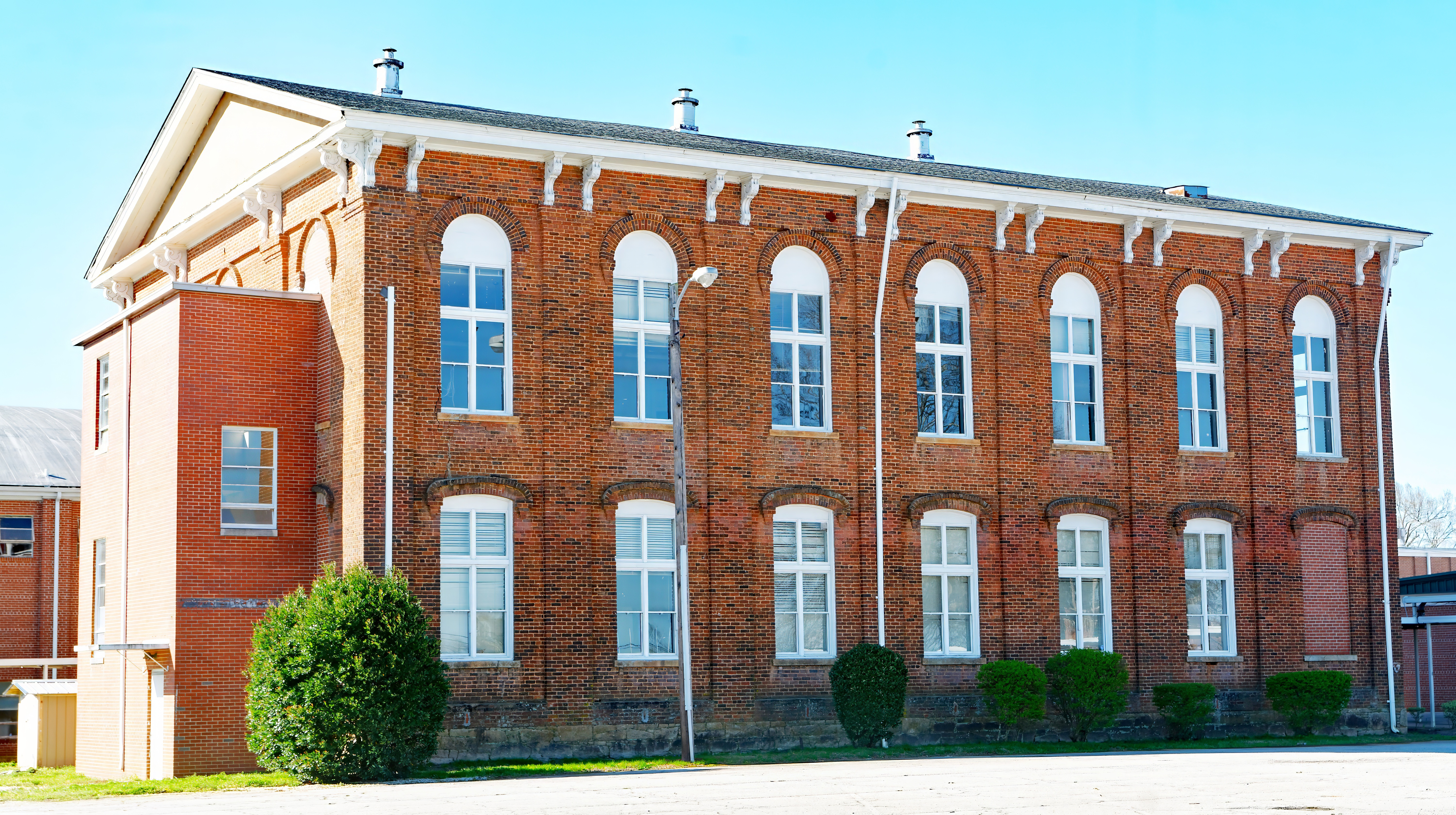
- The building in 2018

- Location within Georgia Location within the United States
- Location: E. Poplar and 4th Sts., Griffin, Georgia
- Coordinates: 33°14′47″N 84°15′35″W
- Area: less than one acre
- Built: 1870
- Built by: Jonathan Gilman Drake
- Architectural style: Italianate
- NRHP reference No.: 73002144
- Added to NRHP: March 20, 1973

The Sam Bailey Building, formerly the Sam Bailey Male Institute, is a historic school building in Griffin, Georgia. It was constructed in 1870 and is the oldest public school building in Griffin. Originally a private school, it became a public school in August 1873 before becoming private again in 1877. Eight years later it became public again. It was built for the Griffin Male Institute and was named for Sam Wesley Bailey, a banker and landowner who came to Griffin after the American Civil War and helped fund the school. A two-story brick structure with Italianate details, it is part of the Griffin High School and is connected to other buildings via covered walkways.

The school building was constructed by Jonathan Drake, a major building firm in Griffin. It is located at the corner of East Poplar Street and 4th Street. It was added to the National Register of Historic Places In 1973.

== See also ==
- National Register of Historic Places listings in Spalding County, Georgia
