= Richard W. and Margaret Mills House =

Historic house in Wisconsin, United States

- U.S. National Register of Historic Places
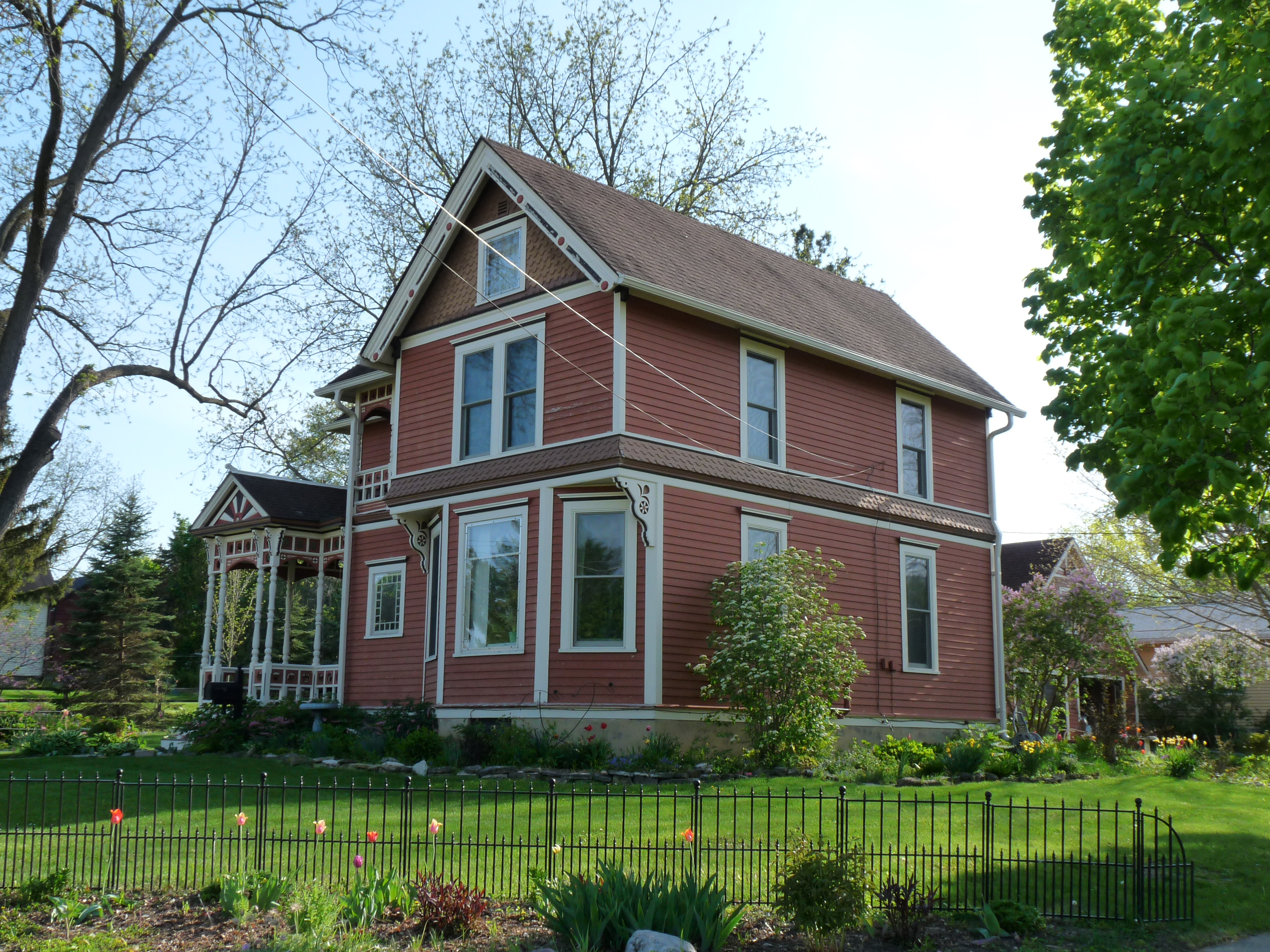

- Location within Wisconsin Location within the United States
- Location: 104 Grand Ave., Lodi, Wisconsin
- Coordinates: 43°18′51″N 89°31′57″W
- Area: less than one acre
- Built: 1896
- Architectural style: Queen Anne
- NRHP reference No.: 09000048
- Added to NRHP: February 18, 2009

The Richard W. and Margaret Mills House is located in Lodi, Wisconsin, United States. It was added to the National Register of Historic Places in 2009.

== History ==
The house was originally built from 1895 to 1896 and belonged to Richard and Margaret Mills. In 1898 it was expanded.

Richard Mills' brother, Job, built the Job Mills Block, which is also listed on the National Register of Historic Places.
