= Job Mills Block =

- U.S. National Register of Historic Places
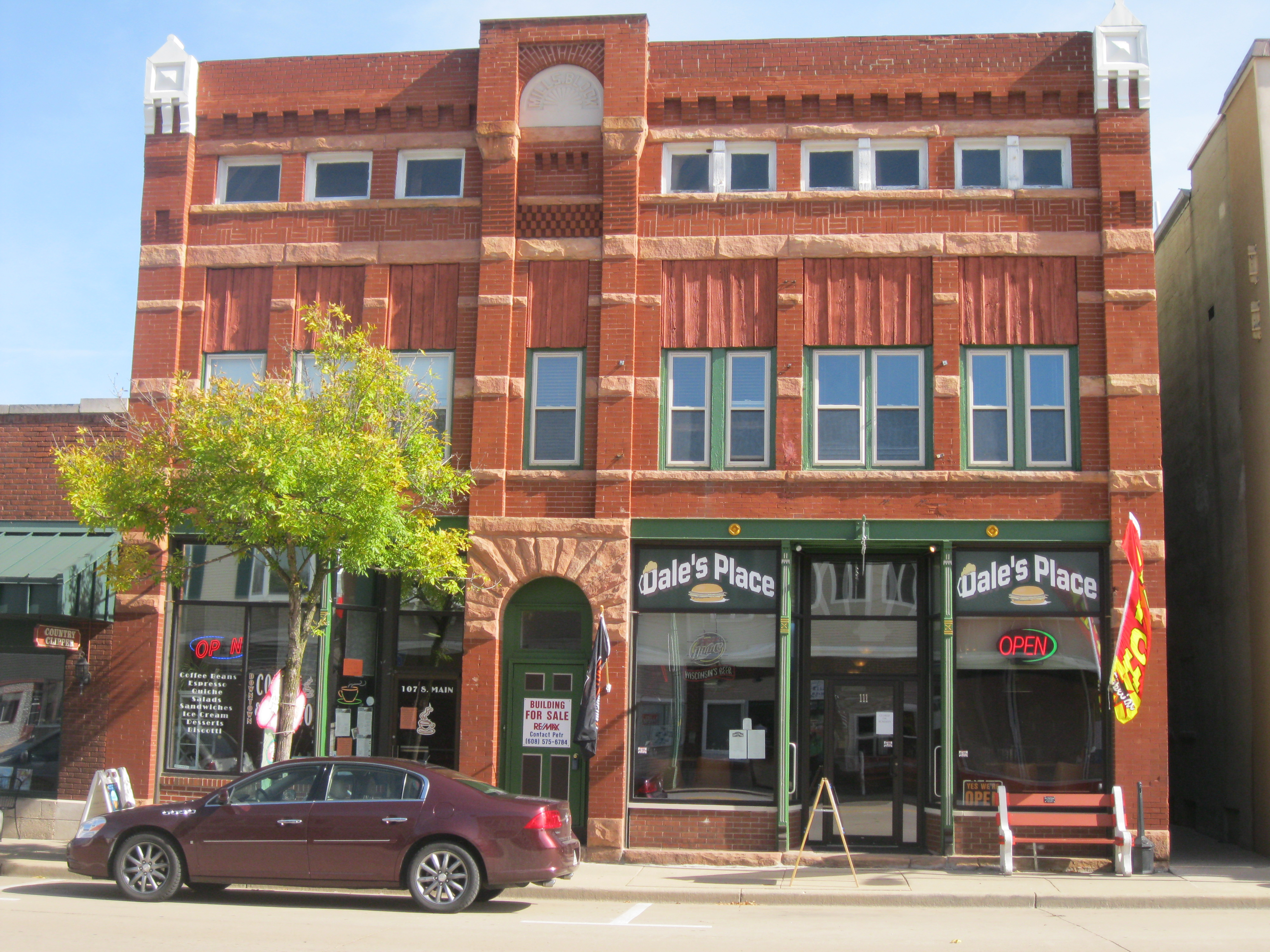

- Location within Wisconsin Location within the United States
- Location: 109-111 S. Main St., Lodi, Wisconsin
- Coordinates: 43°18′50″N 89°31′34″W
- Area: less than one acre
- Built: 1895
- Architectural style: Romanesque
- NRHP reference No.: 08001115
- Added to NRHP: November 26, 2008

The Job Mills Block is located in Lodi, Wisconsin, United States. It was added to the National Register of Historic Places in 2008.

== History ==
The building was built by English immigrant Job Mills. Historically, it has been used as a specialty store and a post office. It is currently a restaurant.

Job Mills' brother, Richard, owned the Richard W. and Margaret Mills House, which is also listed on the National Register of Historic Places.
