= Lewis Este Mills =

American lawyer (1836–1878)

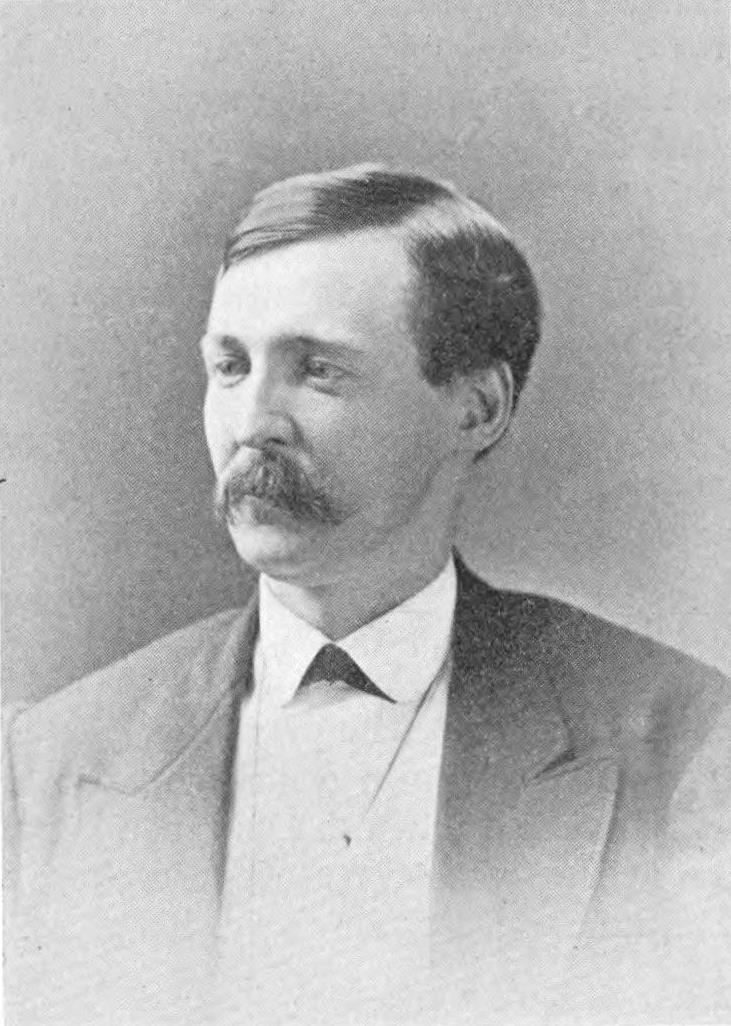
- Mills in an 1897 publication
- Born: August 13, 1836; Morristown, New Jersey, U.S.
- Died: April 10, 1878 (aged 41); Florence, Italy
- Resting place: St. Peter's Cemetery; Cincinnati, Ohio, U.S.
- Education: Yale College
- Occupations: Lawyer; author
- Spouse: Jean Springer (m. 1864)

Lewis Este Mills (August 13, 1836 – April 10, 1878) was an American lawyer and author.

== Early life ==
Lewis Este Mills was born on August 13, 1836, in Morristown, New Jersey, to Sarah Ann (née Este) and Lewis Mills. He graduated from Yale College in 1856. He studied law at first in Morristown, and later completed his studies in Cincinnati, where he was admitted to the bar in November 1858.

== Career ==
Mills became a partner of the firm Mills & Hoadly. His brother was a senior member of the firm. In 1859, he formed the law practice Mills & Goshorn with Alfred T. Goshorn and Edward Mills in Cincinnati.

Mills enlisted late to the Union Army as a volunteer aide-de-camp on the staff of Robert Brown Potter. He served in the Army of the Southwest and participated in the Siege of Vicksburg. Following the war, he left his practice and put time into travel and literary pursuits. He printed privately a volume of Glimpses of Southern France and Spain in 1867. He wrote General Pope's Virginia Campaign of 1862 in 1870. He published a revision of Handy's Reports of the Superior Court of Cincinnati in 1877.

== Personal life ==
Mills married Jean Springer, daughter of Charles Gordon Springer, on January 7, 1864. Her father died in the SS Arctic disaster of 1854. They had no children.

While traveling in Normandy, Brussels, and Florence, Italy, in 1877, Mills suffered from a kidney disease. He died of heart disease on April 10, 1878, in Florence. His funeral was held on October 10, 1878. He was buried in St. Peter's Cemetery in Cincinnati.
