= Mills House (Griffin, Georgia) =

Historic house in Georgia, US

- U.S. National Register of Historic Places
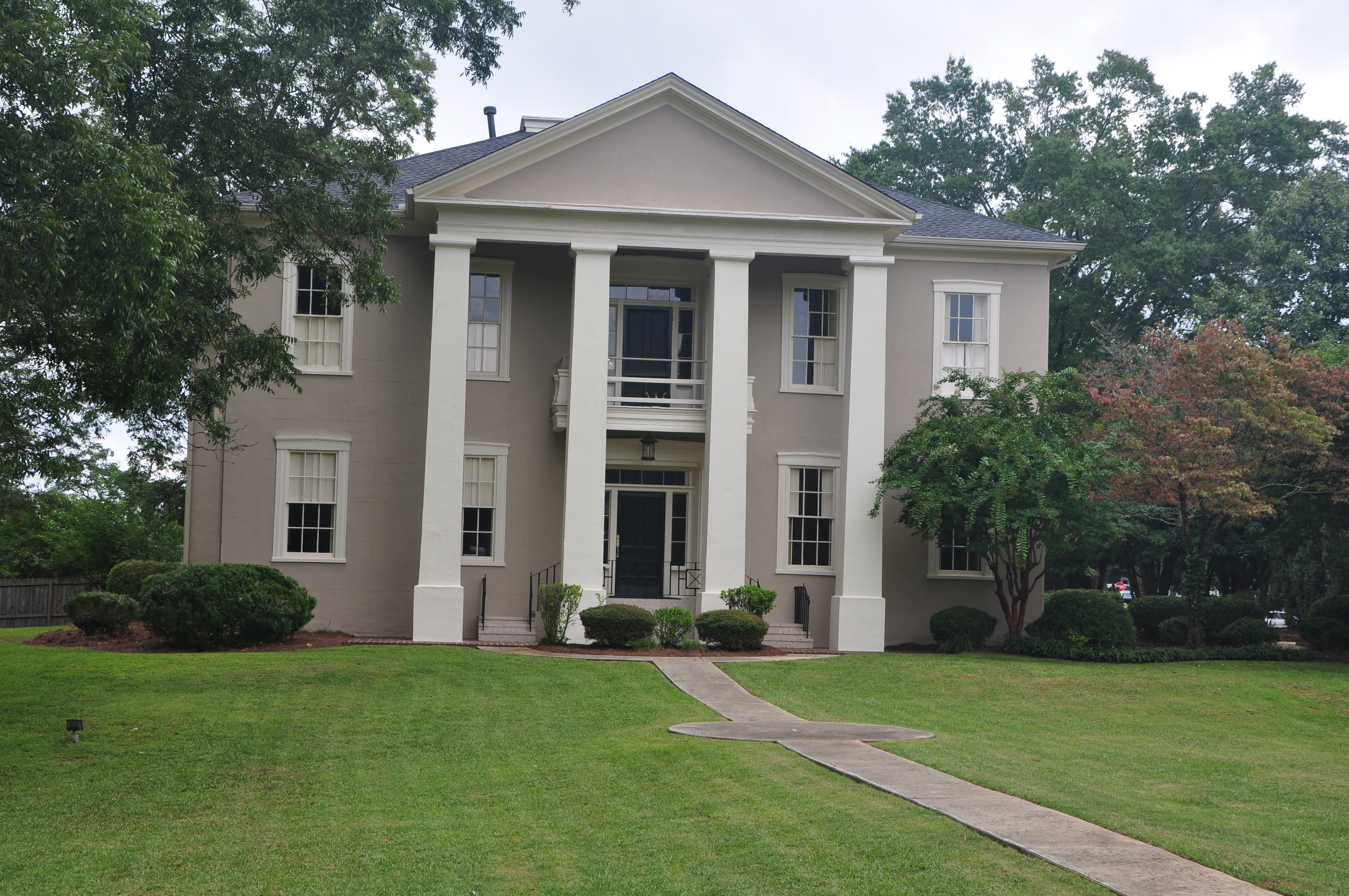

- Location within Georgia
- Location: 406 N. Hill St., Griffin, Georgia
- Coordinates: 33.254°N 84.263°W
- Area: 0.8 acres (0.32 ha)
- Built: c.1855
- Architectural style: Greek Revival
- NRHP reference No.: 72001468
- Added to NRHP: October 18, 1972

The Mills House, also known as the Lewis-Mills House, is a historic residence in Griffin, Spalding County, Georgia. It was added to the National Register of Historic Places on October 18, 1972. It is located at 406 North Hill Street.

It is a fine example of a Greek Revival "temple-front" house, and perhaps was designed by Charles B. Cluskey. It was built in the 1850s for the Lewis family, and was long occupied by the Mills family. In 2018 it is currently a law office.

== See also ==
- National Register of Historic Places listings in Spalding County, Georgia
