= William T. Goodrich House =

Historic house in Iowa, United States

- U.S. National Register of Historic Places
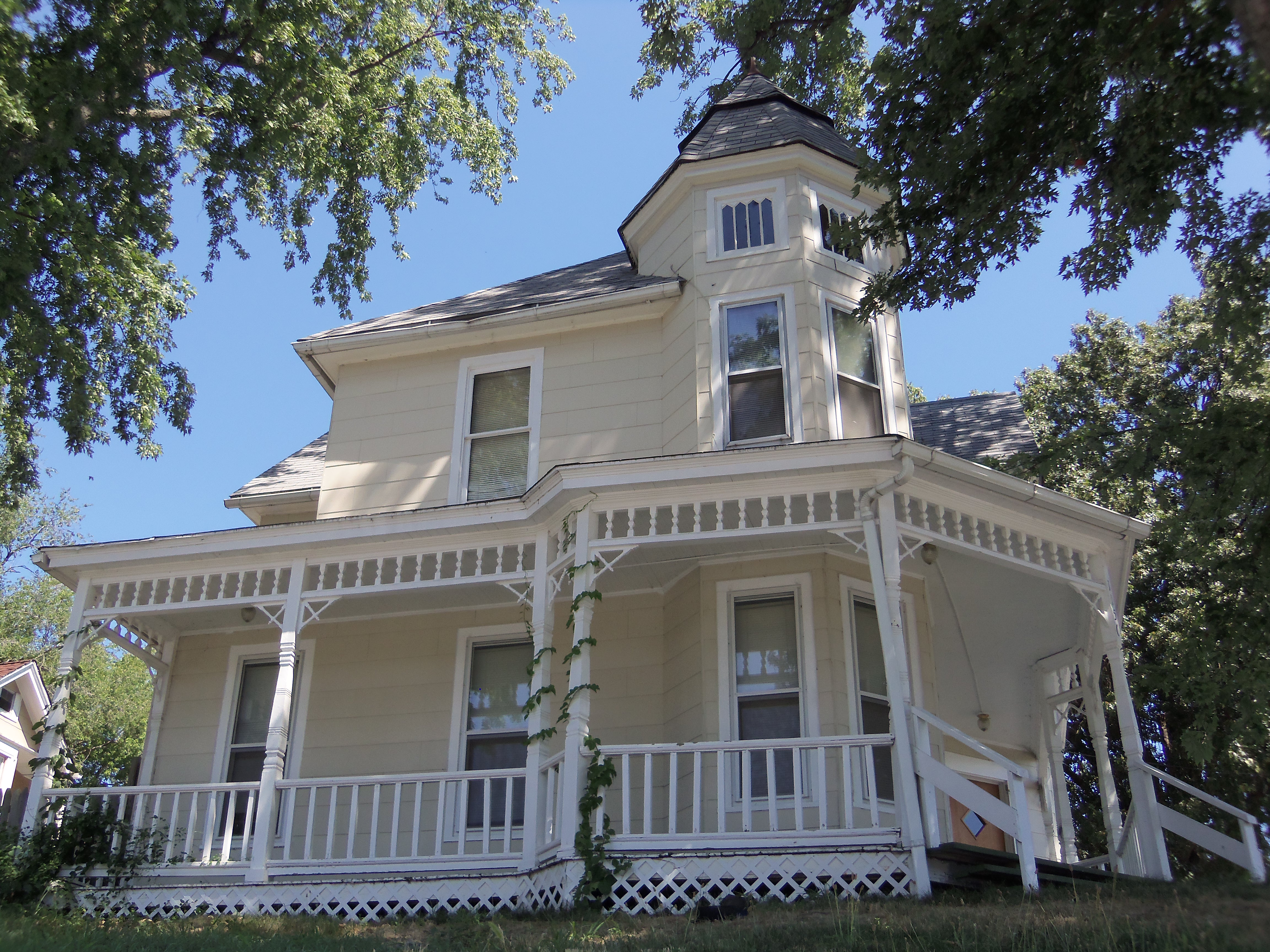

- Location within Iowa Location within the United States
- Location: 1156 E. 15th St. Davenport, Iowa
- Coordinates: 41°32′24″N 90°34′32″W
- Area: less than one acre
- Built: 1900
- Architectural style: Queen Anne
- MPS: Davenport MRA
- NRHP reference No.: 83002441
- Added to NRHP: July 7, 1983

The William T. Goodrich House is located on the east side of Davenport, Iowa, United States. It has been listed on the National Register of Historic Places since 1983. William T. Goodrich was a harness maker and a foreman at the Rock Island Arsenal. The 2½-story frame structure features the asymmetry and irregular plan that are typical of the Queen Anne style. The corner tower and the broad wrap-around porch are prominent features. It is located on a raised corner lot that gives the house an added sense of prominence.
