= Valley View Leasing and Mining Company Mill =

- U.S. National Register of Historic Places
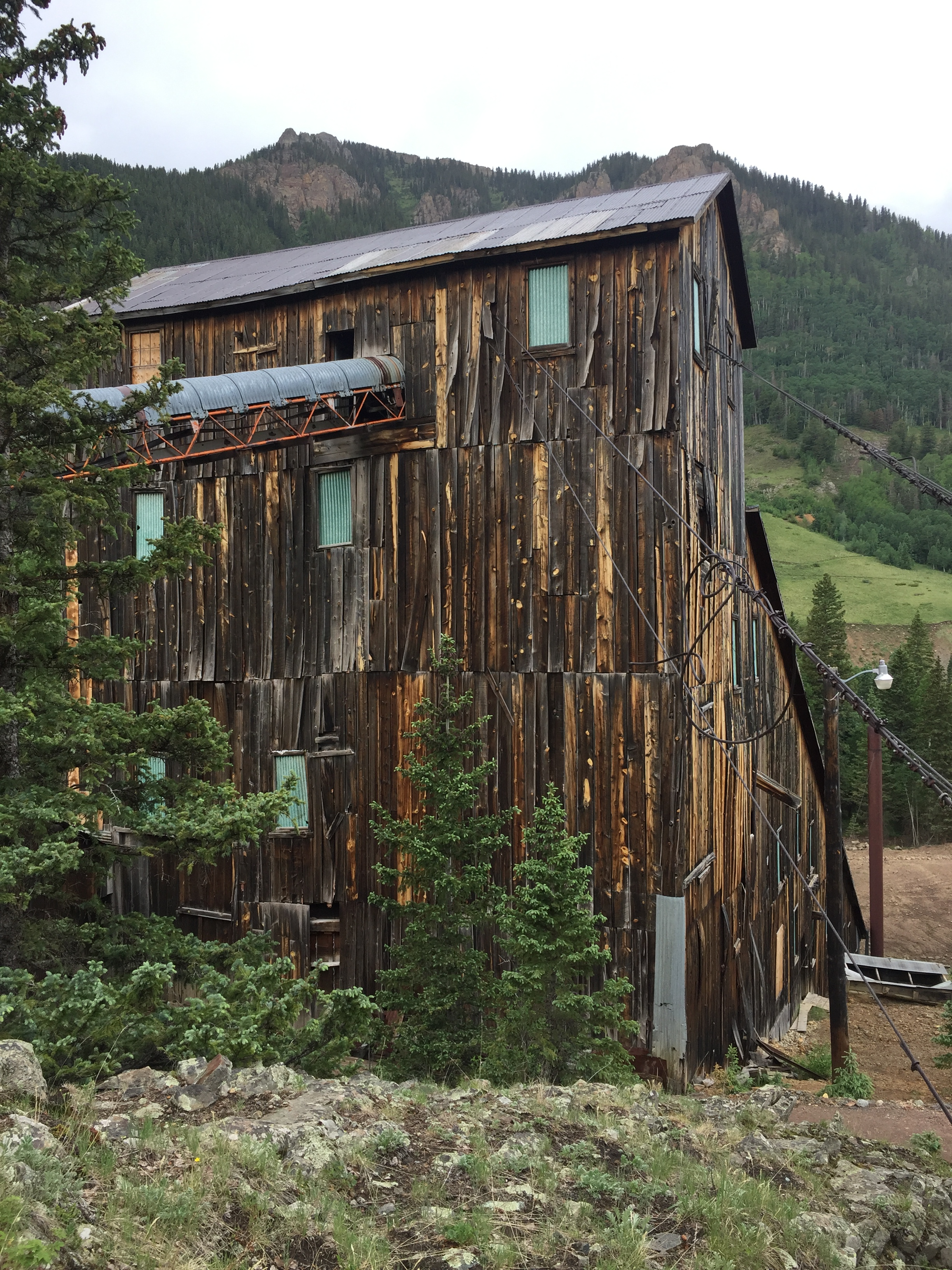
- Mill building in 2023

- Location within Colorado
- Location: State Highway 145, 2.8 miles south of Ophir, Colorado
- Coordinates: 37.84917°N 107.88466°W
- Area: less than one acre
- Built: 1920
- Built by: Otto Beselack
- Architect: Walter L. Reed
- MPS: Mining Industry in Colorado, MPS
- NRHP reference No.: 10000035
- Added to NRHP: February 24, 2010

The Valley View Leasing and Mining Company Mill, also known as the Matterhorn Mill, near Ophir, Colorado, is a flotation mill which was built in 1920 and was renovated in 1961. It was listed on the National Register of Historic Places in 2010.

It is 146 by 46 feet (45 m × 14 m) in plan and 96 feet (29 m) tall.

The mill is located in the valley of the Lake Fork of the San Miguel River at an elevation of 9,431 feet, and at the base of the east slope of 11,845 foot high San Bernardo Mountain in the Trout Lake Mining District just north of Lizard Head Pass. The mill is located approximately 30 degrees from true north, however, the following description refers to nominal directions. Thus, the structure extends roughly 146 feet east to west and 46 feet north to south. At its highest point at the east, the mill is ninety-six feet in height and is visible above the surrounding forest from the highway. To the west, the 146-foot long mill extends down a west slope in five steps to the mill tailings pond located on what was a bench above the Lake Fork of the San Miguel River. The area around the mill is forested, though to the east it is sparse within the 150-foot setback from the highway. Access is by a circular roadway system that connects to the highway north and south of the mill site. The dirt access road leads to the 1960s storage bin of the mill. Beyond is the original grade of the abandoned Rio Grande Southern Railroad spur that extended 200 feet northerly from the Matterhorn Depot across the east elevation of the mill and terminating at the northeast corner according to the 1922 Sanborn Map. The spur passed through a rock cut constructed in 1919 in preparation for the construction of the mill. The Sanborn Map also noted that the mill was electrified, steam heated, and supplied with water from the nearby “creek” that was stored in a 10,000 gallon tank located on the hillside above the mill.

Designated a San Miguel County Landmark December 16, 2005, the Matterhorn Mill was typical of the first generation of flotation mills used to concentrate ores prior to shipment to distant smelters for final processing. The Matterhorn Mill included the four systems of a typical mill, as described in period texts, such as Antoine Marc Gaudin's Flotation (New York: McGraw Hill, 1932): 1) an ore delivery system, 2) a crushing and storage section, 3) the concentration section, and 4) filtration and bagging/shipping section. Typical of a flotation mill, the ore from the mine traveled down through fifteen levels to be reduced into concentrates. The levels augmented the economical processing of ore utilizing gravity. Nearly all the equipment remaining in the mill clearly illustrates the flotation process.

It was designed by Walter L. Reed and was built by Otto Beselack.

In 2009 it was owned by the U.S. Forest Service.

In 2020, at 100 years of age, it was announced that the mill was "undergoing a restoration project that will stabilize the remaining architecture, improve the structural integrity and cleanup the mining waste and tailings piles. Following the completion of the mill repairs and cleanup, a historic preservation easement will facilitate the conveyance of the mill from the U.S. Forest Service to San Miguel County to sustain the Matterhorn Mill for public enjoyment and education."

It is located off Colorado State Highway 145, about 2.8 miles (4.5 km) south of Ophir, within what was the historic townsite of Matterhorn, Colorado, which was known as San Bernardo, Colorado before 1908.

== See also ==
- Trout Lake (Colorado)
