= Pritchard-Moore-Goodrich House =

Historic house in the US state of Georgia

- U.S. National Register of Historic Places
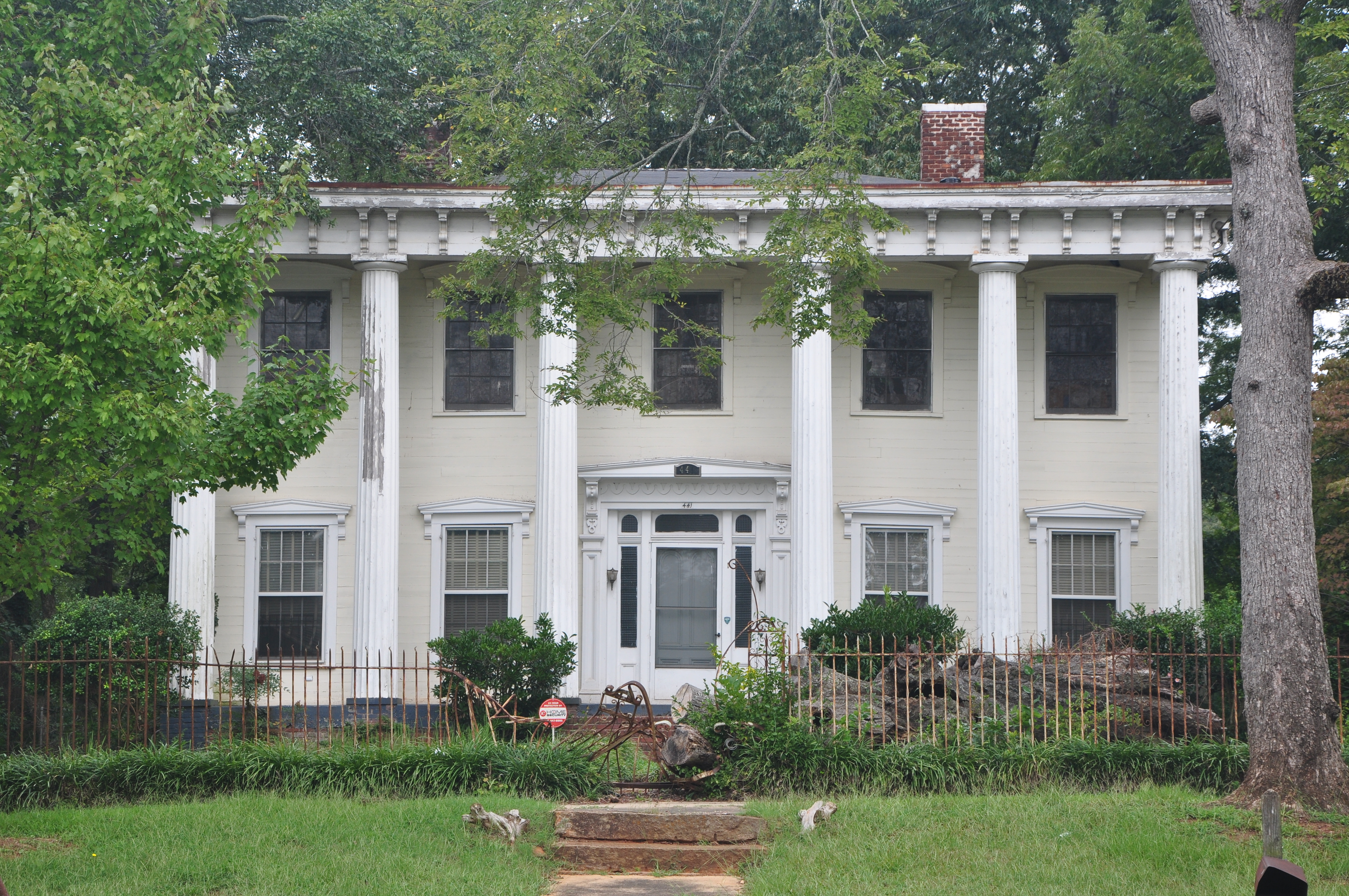

- Location within Georgia
- Location: 441 N. Hill St., Griffin, Georgia
- Coordinates: 33.2551°N 84.26411°W
- Area: 0.5 acres (0.20 ha)
- Built: 1850
- Architectural style: Greek Revival, Greek revival transitional
- NRHP reference No.: 73002143
- Added to NRHP: March 7, 1973

Pritchard-Moore-Goodrich House is a historic residence in Griffin, Georgia in Spalding County, Georgia. It was constructed by Dr. William Prichard in 1850 on land purchased from attorney Robert Lanier, father of Georgia poet Sidney Lanier. The home had a series of owners beginning with William Wadsworth in 1872 until 1919 when it was purchased by Lucien P. Goodrich, Dr. Prichard's grandson. The home is Greek Revival architecture and includes Doric columns as well as some Italianate architecture features. It was added to the National Register of Historic Places on March 7, 1973. It is located at 441 North Hill Street.

== See also ==
- National Register of Historic Places listings in Spalding County, Georgia
