= Oliver W. Mills House =

Historic house in Connecticut, United States

- U.S. National Register of Historic Places
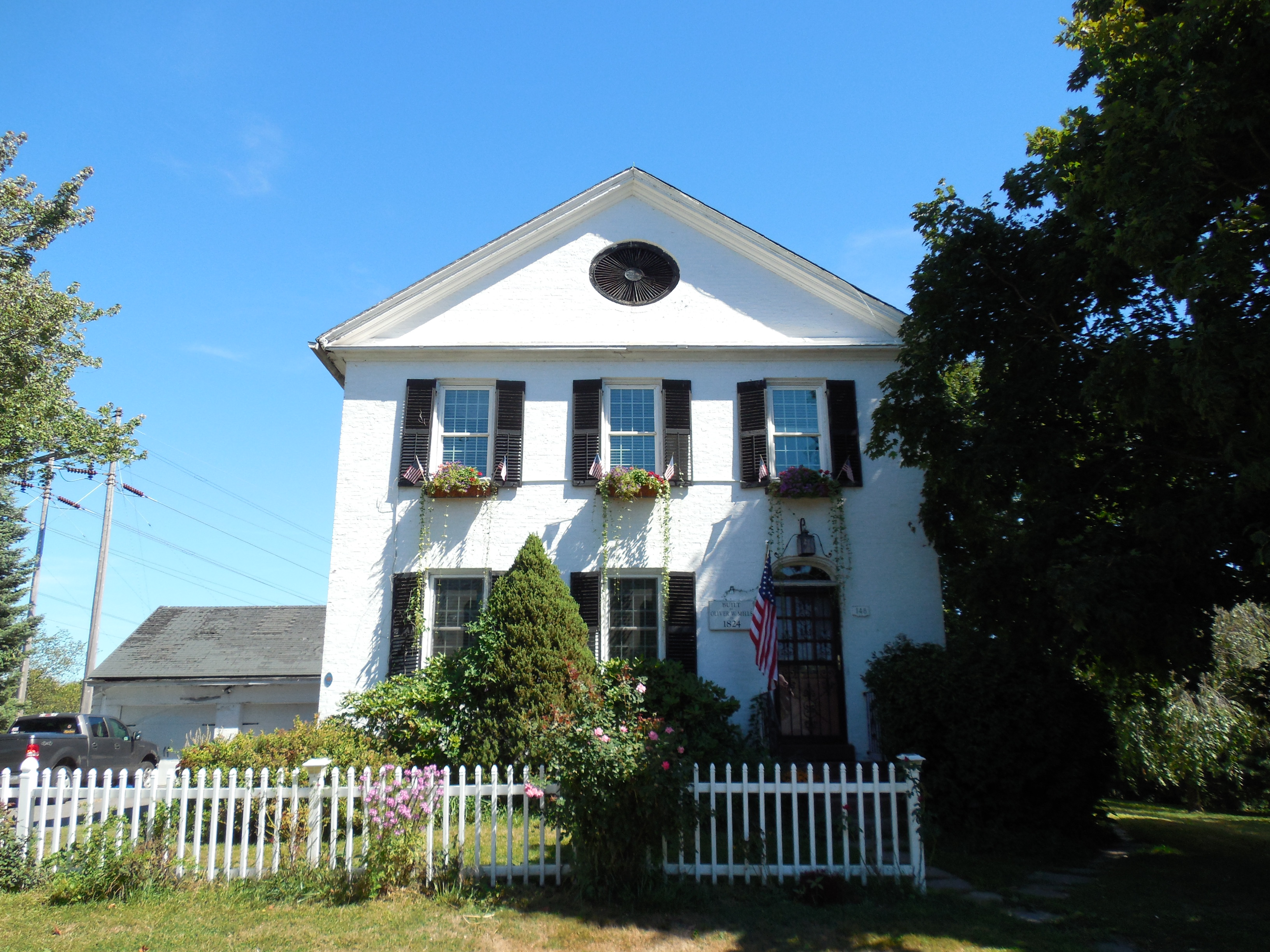

- Location within Connecticut Location within the United States
- Location: 148 Deerfield Road, Windsor, Connecticut
- Coordinates: 41°49′16″N 72°39′9″W
- Area: 1.6 acres (0.65 ha)
- Built: 1824; 202 years ago
- Built by: Mills, Oliver W.
- Architectural style: Federal
- MPS: 18th and 19th Century Brick Architecture of Windsor TR (AD)
- NRHP reference No.: 82004443
- Added to NRHP: February 19, 1982

The Oliver W. Mills House is a historic house at 148 Deerfield Road in Windsor, Connecticut. Built in 1824, it is a well-preserved local example of a Federal period brick house. It was listed on the National Register of Historic Places in 1985.

== Description and history ==
The Oliver W. Mills House is located in southern Windsor, on the east side of Deerfield Road at its northeast corner with Logans Way. It is a 2 1/2-story brick building, with a front-facing gable roof and two interior brick chimneys. The gable is fully pedimented, with a slightly oval fan in the center. The main facade is three bays wide, with the entrance in the rightmost bay, set in a round-arch opening with transom window. Windows are set in rectangular openings, with brownstone sills and headers of soldier bricks in a splayed layout. A two-story brick ell, apparently contemporary to the main part of the house, extends to the rear. The interior layout has three rooms in the main block along with the entry hall, and the kitchen in the ell. The stair and front parlor feature the most elaborate interior woodwork, which is otherwise relatively modest. In some rooms, the original wide floor boards have been overlaid with modern flooring.

The house was built about 1824 by Oliver W. Mills, whose family operated one of the Windsor brickyards. The house is notable for its use of brick in places many period houses do not normally have it, including for the walls and floors of the cellar area. Similar uses are seen the Elijah Mills House, just down the road. In addition to being a brickmaker, Mills was a successful farmer.

== See also ==
- National Register of Historic Places listings in Windsor, Connecticut
