= Fort Carroll =

- U.S. National Register of Historic Places
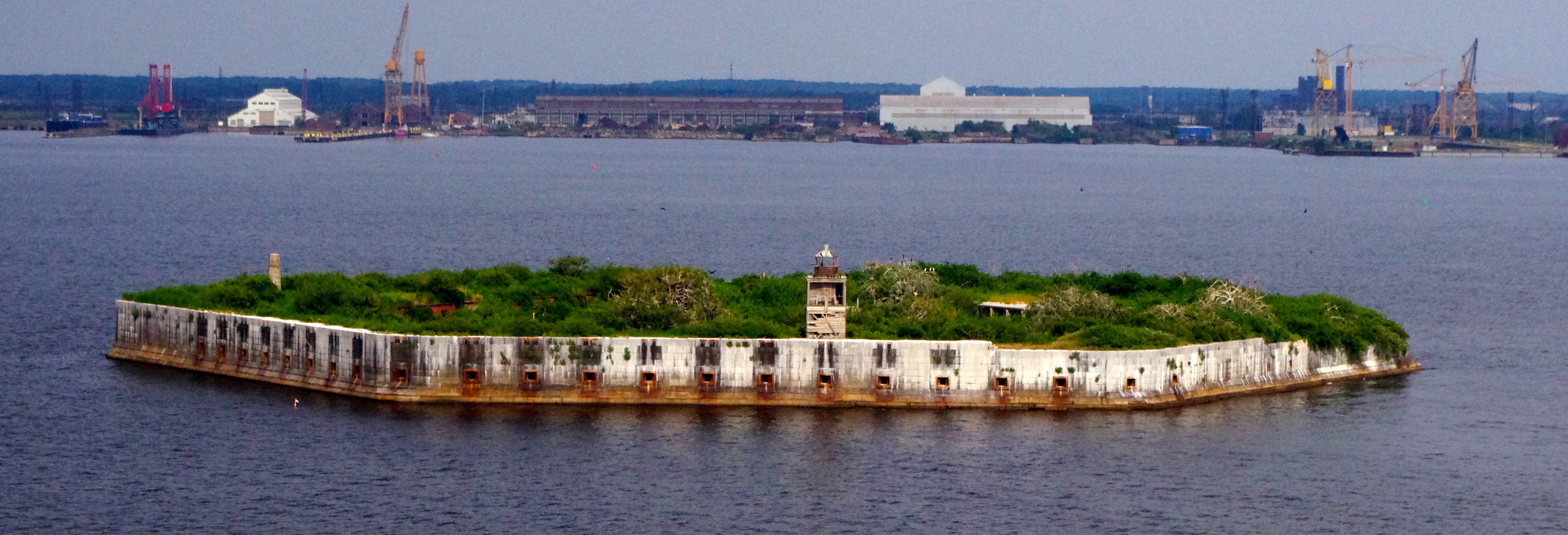
- Fort Carroll, Baltimore, Maryland

- Location within Maryland Location within the United States
- Location: Soller's Flats, in the Patapsco River, near Curtis Bay, Maryland
- Coordinates: 39°12′53″N 76°31′09″W
- Area: 3.4 acres (1.4 ha)
- NRHP reference No.: 14000955
- Added to NRHP: April 14, 2015

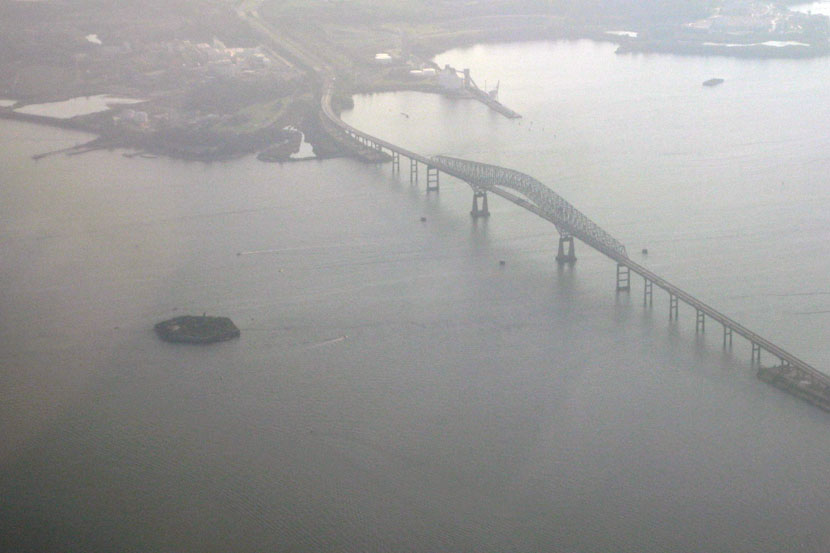
Fort Carroll, next to the Key Bridge

Fort Carroll is a 3.4-acre (1.4 ha) artificial island and abandoned hexagonal sea fort in the middle of the Patapsco River, just south of Baltimore, Maryland. It is named for Charles Carroll of Carrollton (1737–1832), a signer of the Declaration of Independence.

== Design and construction ==
In 1847, the State of Maryland permitted the United States War Department to construct a fort in the shallow water of Soller's Point Flats to protect the city of Baltimore. Fort Carroll was important for the defense of Baltimore—before the fort's construction, Fort McHenry just outside the city was the only military defensive structure between Baltimore and the Chesapeake Bay. The fort was part of the "Permanent System" or Third System construction program, which aimed to defend America's most important ports.

Then Brevet-Colonel Robert E. Lee designed the hexagonal structure and supervised the construction, which the U.S. Army Corps of Engineers commenced in 1848. The fort received its name on October 8, 1850. In 1852, Lee left Baltimore to become Superintendent of the United States Military Academy at West Point.

In 1853, a lighthouse, now abandoned, was built on the ramparts to aid navigation into Baltimore Harbor. In 1898, a new lighthouse was built, which is still seen today. It was automated in 1920 and discontinued operations sometime before 1945.

The original design foresaw the fort armed with 225 cannons on three levels. However, in April 1861, at the American Civil War outbreak, Fort Carroll's walls were still less than half the planned height of thirty feet. Only five gun platforms were ready, and only two were armed. Still, the Army placed about thirty cannons and occupied the fort throughout the war. In April 1864, torrential rains flooded the fort's magazines, which led the Army to move all the powder and ammunition to Fort McHenry.

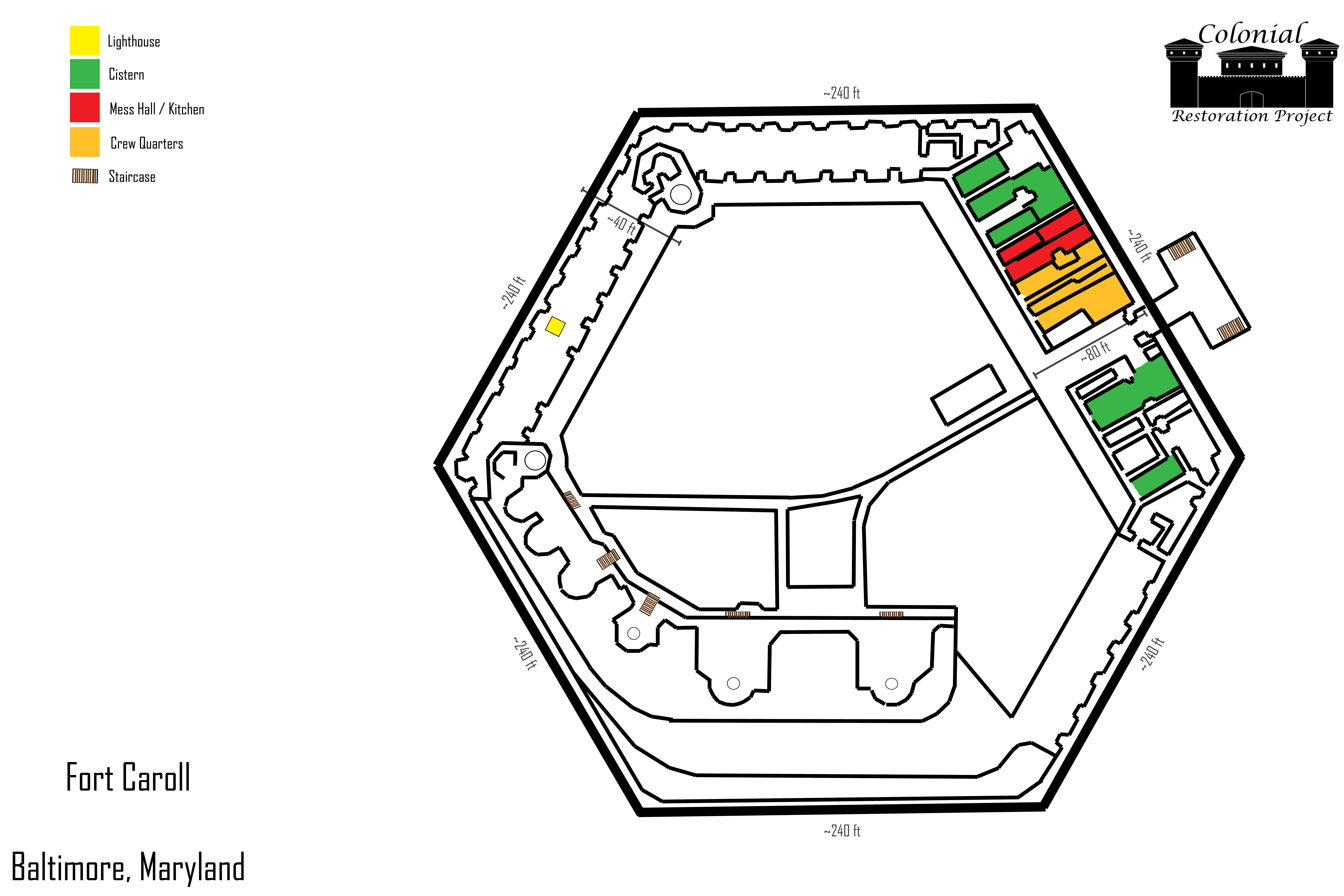
A diagram of the fort based on a 1914 topographic map

== Spanish–American War ==
When the United States entered the Spanish–American War in 1898, the Army again defended the fort, although the batteries were completely obsolete by then. The Army, therefore, commenced the construction of modern concrete gun emplacements following the Board of Fortifications designs. The Army created three batteries: Battery Towson (Note: The battery was named in honor of Major General Nathan Towson, U.S. Army. He had served in the War of 1812 and the Mexican War and died July 20, 1854, in Washington, District of Columbia.) (two 12" barbette carriage guns), Battery Heart (Note: The battery was named in honor of Major Jonathan Heart, 2nd U.S. Infantry, who served during the Revolutionary War. He died on November 4, 1791, in action with Indians near Fort Recovery, Ohio.) (two 5-inch M1897 guns on balanced pillar mounts) and Battery Augustin (Note: Battery Augustin was named in honor of 2nd Lieutenant Joseph N. Augustin, Jr., 24th U.S. Infantry, who died July 2, 1898 of wounds he had received the day before at the Battle of San Juan Hill.) (two 3" balanced pedestal-mount guns).

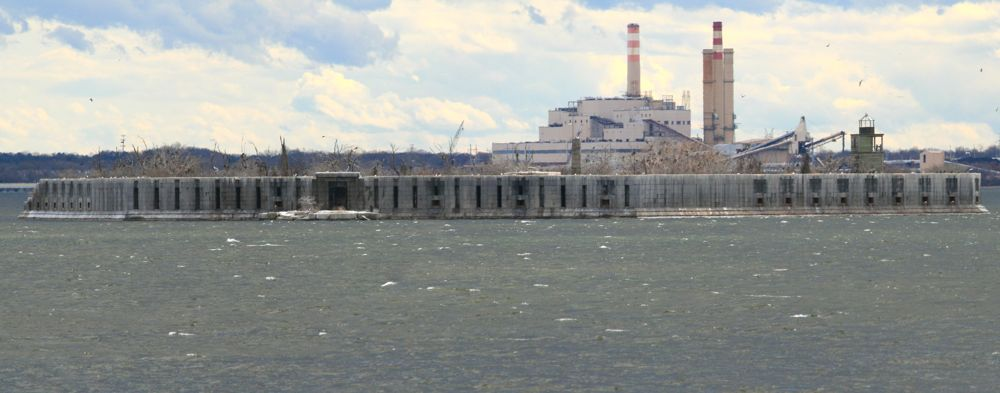
Fort Carroll. Note that the industrial plant in the background is not on the island.

The new batteries were ready by September 1900, well after the war's end. They received their names on March 30, 1903.

== World War I and afterwards ==
After World War I broke out, in 1917, the Army removed the guns from Battery Heart, and in 1918, those from Battery Towson to use elsewhere. By 1920, all guns had been removed from the fort.

In March 1921, the Army officially abandoned Fort Carroll and moved whatever military equipment was left to nearby Fort Howard. The War Department declared the island excess property in 1923 but took no immediate steps to sell the land. A variety of proposals for the use of the island were advanced, including a prison, as well as a 1923 plan advanced by Baltimore mayor William Broening to place an electric "Welcome to Baltimore" sign on the island, accompanied by a statue of Lord Baltimore.

In World War II, the Army used the fort as a firing range. It also served as a checkpoint for vessels.

In May 1958, Baltimore attorney Benjamin Eisenberg purchased the island for US$10,000 (equivalent to $111,592 in 2025), intending to put a casino there, but development plans never materialized. The fort is now an involuntary park. It is also a site for occasional urban explorations (which constitute trespass). In 2013, Preservation Maryland placed Fort Carroll on its list of threatened historic properties. It was listed on the National Register of Historic Places in 2015.

On April 19, 2024, the third temporary alternate channel established after the collapse of the Francis Scott Key Bridge was named after the fort, the beginning of which is to its immediate west.

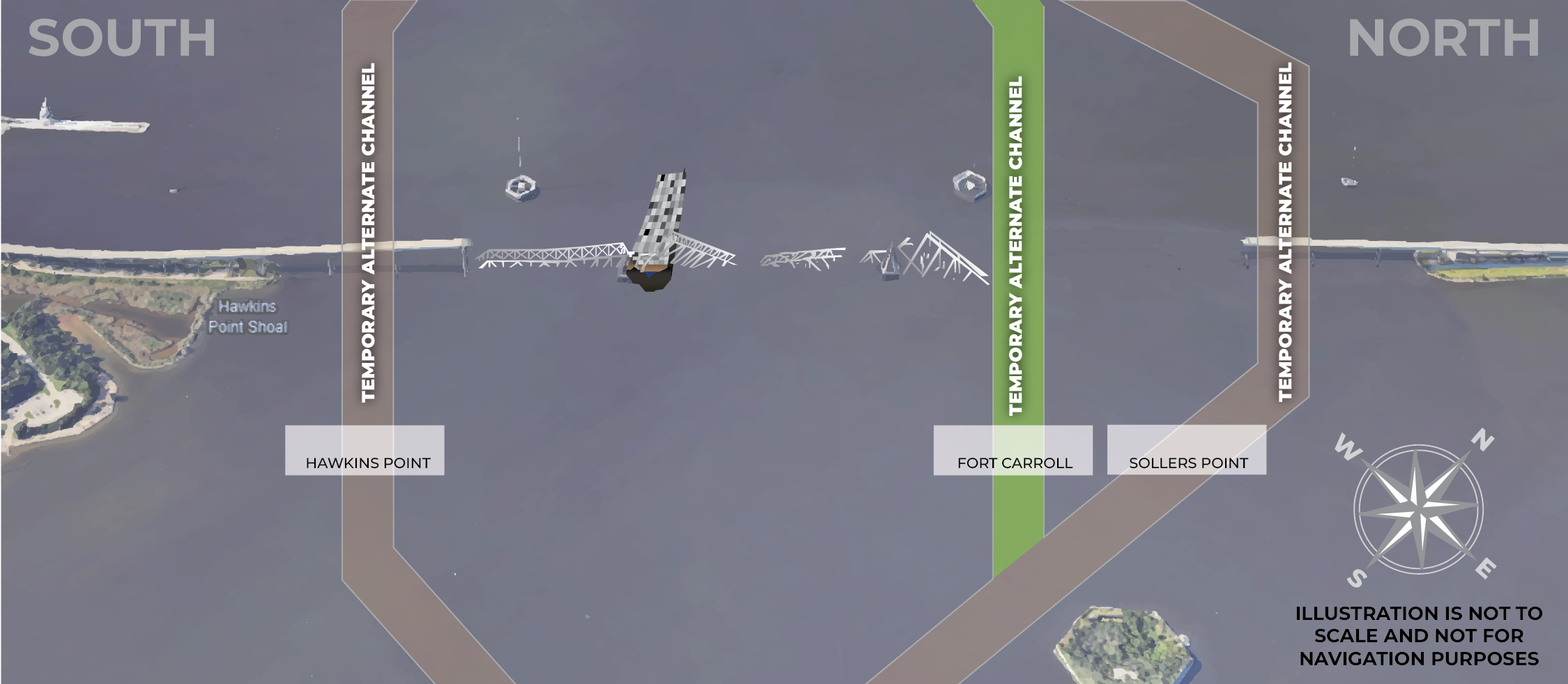
The three temporary channels as of April 20, 2024
