= Lewis H. Mills House (1916) =

Historic building in Portland, Oregon, U.S.

- U.S. National Register of Historic Places
- U.S. Historic district – Contributing property
- Portland Historic Landmark
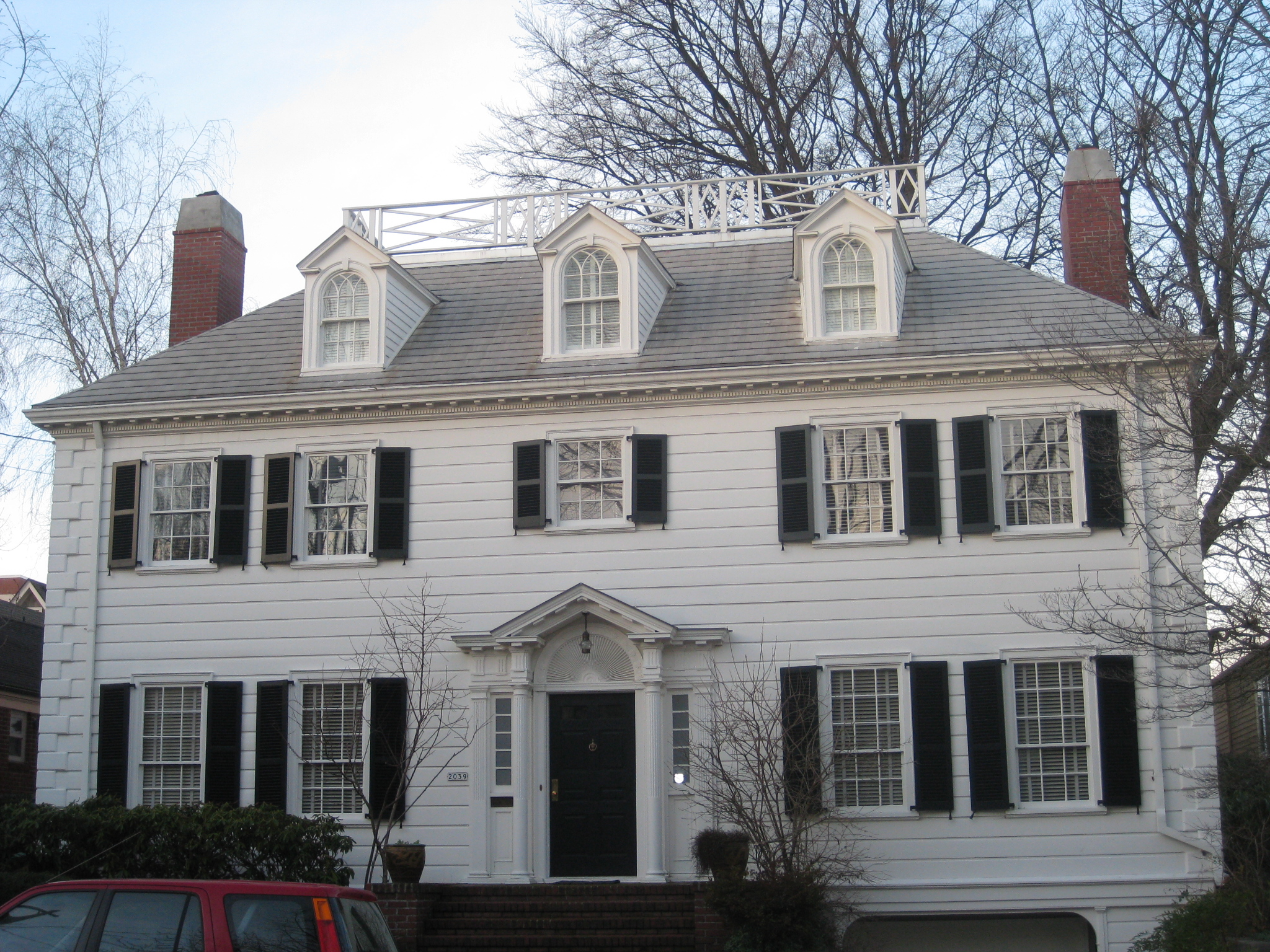

- Location within Oregon Location within the United States
- Location: 2039 NW Irving Street; Portland, Oregon
- Coordinates: 45°31′40″N 122°41′36″W
- Built: 1916
- Architect: Charles Allerton Coolidge
- Architectural style: Colonial Revival, Georgian Revival
- Part of: Alphabet Historic District (ID00001293)
- NRHP reference No.: 82003745
- Added to NRHP: August 26, 1982

The Lewis H. Mills House is a house located in northwest Portland, Oregon listed on the National Register of Historic Places.

== See also ==
- National Register of Historic Places listings in Northwest Portland, Oregon
