= Elijah Mills House =

Historic house in Connecticut, United States

- U.S. National Register of Historic Places
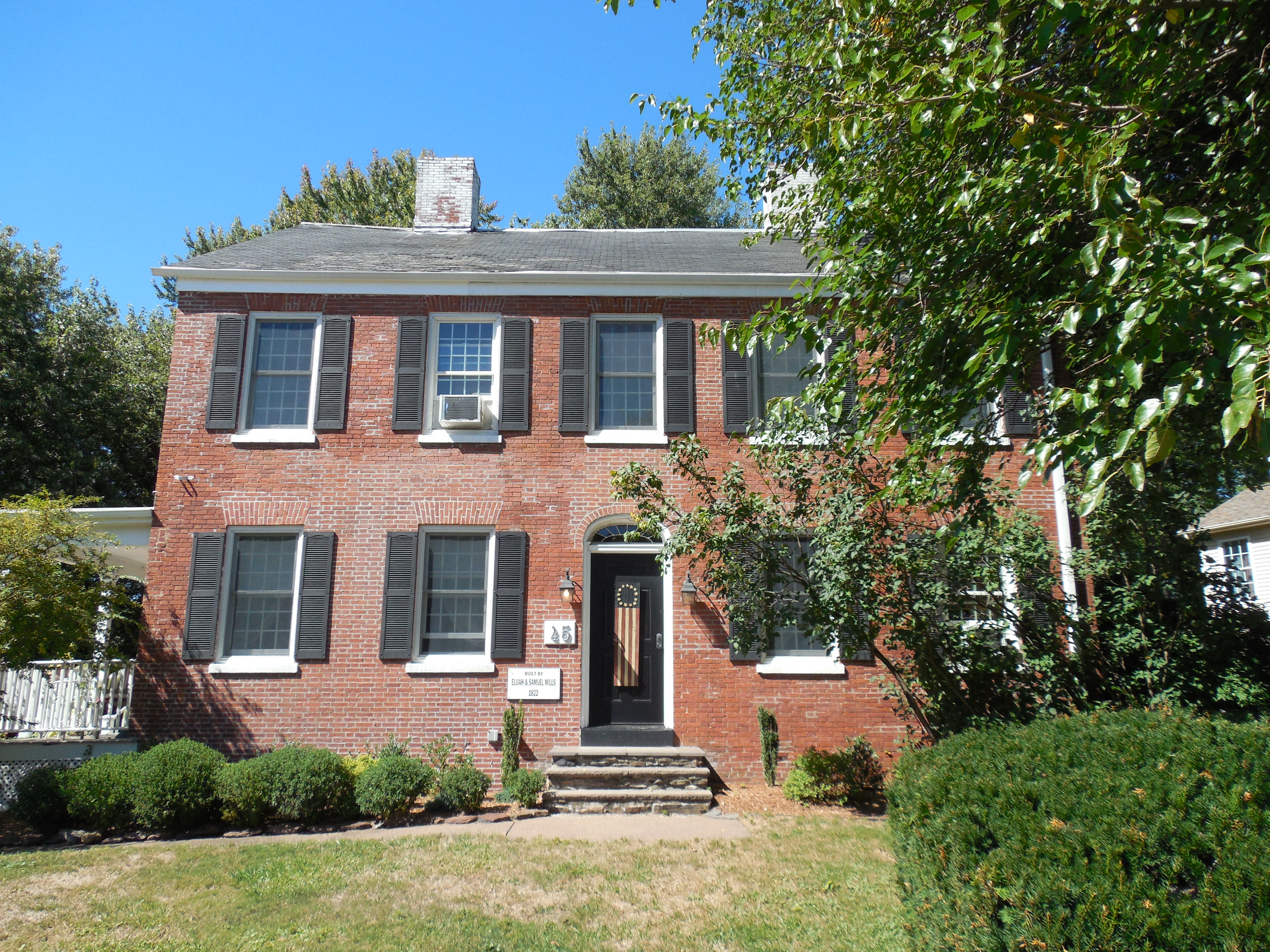

- Location within Connecticut Location within the United States
- Location: 45 Deerfield Road, Windsor, Connecticut
- Coordinates: 41°49′6″N 72°39′20″W
- Area: less than one acre
- Built: 1822
- Built by: Mills, Elijah
- Architectural style: Federal
- MPS: 18th and 19th Century Brick Architecture of Windsor TR (AD)
- NRHP reference No.: 85001829
- Added to NRHP: August 23, 1985

The Elijah Mills House is a United States historic house at 45 Deerfield Road in Windsor, Connecticut. Built in 1822, it is a well-preserved local example of a Federal period brick house. It was listed on the National Register of Historic Places in 1985.

== Description and history ==
The Elijah Mills House is located in southern Windsor, on the west side of Deerfield Road just north of Interstate 291. It is a 2 1/2-story brick building, with a side gable roof and two interior brick chimneys. The main facade is five bays wide and symmetrically arranged, with a center entrance. Windows are set in rectangular openings, with stone sills and headers of soldier bricks in a splayed layout. The entrance is framed by narrow boards and topped by a semi-elliptical transom window. A single-story wood frame porch extends along the south side, covered by a low-pitch shed roof. The southern gable end has a bricked-over semi-elliptical opening. A wood-frame ell extends to the rear of the main block, joining it to an old barn. The interior follows a central hall plan, with an archway separating the entry area from the two-run staircase. There are two rooms on either side of the hall, each of the front parlors featuring a decorative fireplace mantel. There are relatively few 20th-century alterations.

The house was built about 1822 by Elijah Mills, whose family operated one of the Windsor brickyards. The house is notable for its use of brick in places many period houses do not normally have it, including for the walls and floors of the cellar area. Similar uses are seen the Oliver W. Mills House, just up the road. The rear ell and barn both exhibit alterations supporting use of their attic spaces as housing for farm workers.

== See also ==
- National Register of Historic Places listings in Windsor, Connecticut
