= Mills House and Smokehouse =

- U.S. National Register of Historic Places
- Location within Georgia
- Nearest city: Griffin, Georgia
- Coordinates: 33°12′34″N 84°17′44″W
- Area: less than one acre
- Built: 1875
- Architectural style: Italianate, Italianate vernacular
- NRHP reference No.: 80004308
- Added to NRHP: January 20, 1980

The Mills House and Smokehouse, located south of Griffin, Georgia at 1590 Carver Rd., is an Italianate-style house built in 1875 and its smokehouse. It was listed on the National Register of Historic Places in 1980.

It is a two-story building, 40 by 32 feet (12.2 m × 9.8 m) in plan, with a low roof and wide eaves supported by decorative brackets. It has an original one-story front porch. The main part of the house is built of "a combination of heavy mortised and tenoned timbers and light dimensioned lumber fastened with cut nails. This structure is sheathed with weatherboards, painted white. The house was originally supported by brick piers; it now rests on a continuous brick foundation wall. Original wood shingles on the roof have been covered with large, diamond-shaped asphalt shingles."
