= Bradley International Airport =

Airport near Hartford, Connecticut, USA

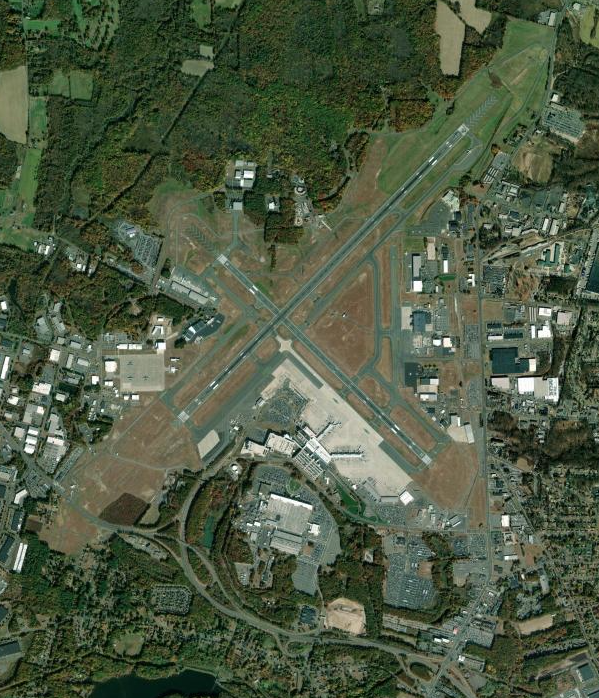
- Bradley International Airport, as seen from above
- IATA: BDL; ICAO: KBDL; FAA LID: BDL; WMO: 72508

Summary
- Airport type: Public
- Owner/Operator: Connecticut Airport Authority
- Serves: State of Connecticut, Western Massachusetts
- Location: Windsor Locks, Connecticut, U.S.
- Operating base for: Breeze Airways
- Time zone: Eastern Time (UTC−04:00)
- Elevation AMSL: 173 ft (53 m)
- Coordinates: 41°56′21″N 072°41′00″W
- Website: bradleyairport.com

Maps
- FAA airport diagram (2025)
- Interactive map of Bradley International Airport

Runways
Direction	Length		Surface
Direction	ft	m	Surface
06/24	9,510	2,899	Asphalt
15/33	6,847	2,087	Asphalt

Statistics (2025)
- Total enplanements: 3,327,905
- Total deplanements: 3,333,966
- Total passengers: 6,661,871 ▲0.1%
- Source: Federal Aviation Administration

Bradley International Airport (IATA: BDL, ICAO: KBDL, FAA LID: BDL), formerly known as Bradley Field, is a public international airport in Windsor Locks, Connecticut, United States. Owned and operated by the Connecticut Airport Authority, it is Connecticut's busiest airport and the second-largest airport in New England after Boston's Logan International Airport. The airport is about halfway between Hartford, Connecticut, and Springfield, Massachusetts. Bradley is also a dual-use military facility and home to the 103rd Airlift Wing of the Connecticut Air National Guard.

Part of the airport property extends into East Granby and Suffield. The airport is adjacent to the New England Air Museum.

The Federal Aviation Administration (FAA) categorizes Bradley as a medium-hub primary commercial service facility.

== History ==
=== 20th century ===
Bradley International Airport originated in 1940 when the state of Connecticut acquired 1,700 acres of land in Windsor Locks, Connecticut. In 1941, the land was transferred to the U.S. Army, as the United States began preparing for World War II.

The airfield was named for Lt. Eugene M. Bradley, a 24-year old pilot assigned to the 64th Pursuit Squadron, who died on August 21, 1941, when his P-40 crashed during a dogfight training drill.

The airfield began civilian operations in 1947 as Bradley International Airport, Eastern Air Lines operating the first commercial flight. International cargo operations also began that year. By the late 1940s several airlines, including American Airlines and United Airlines, had transferred service from Hartford-Brainard Airport to Bradley. During the 1950s and 1960s, additional carriers: Northeast Airlines, Mohawk Airlines, TWA, and Allegheny Airlines expanded service at the airport, helping Bradley become the primary commercial airport for the Hartford, Connecticut, and Springfield, Massachusetts region. The construction of Interstate 91 improved access between the airport and both cities.

In 1948, the federal government transferred ownership of the airport to the state of Connecticut for public and commercial use.

Passenger traffic grew rapidly during the postwar period, exceeding 100,000 annual passengers in 1950 and 500,000 by 1960.

In 1952, the Murphy Terminal opened. Later designated Terminal B, it remained in use until its closure in 2010.

In 1971, the Murphy Terminal was expanded with an International Arrivals wing. Instrument Landing Systems were installed on two runways in 1977.

Construction began in 1974 on an experimental People Mover connecting the main passenger terminal with a remote parking lot. The system was completed in 1975 but was never placed into service because of the high operating cost and limited parking demand. It was dismantled in 1984 to make way for a new terminal building, Terminal A. The vehicles were later preserved by the Connecticut Trolley Museum in East Windsor, Connecticut.

In 1979, the Windsor Locks tornado struck the eastern portions of the airport, causing severe damage to the New England Air Museum. The museum reopened in 1981.

Terminal A and the Bradley Sheraton Hotel were completed in 1986. Around the same time, the Roncari cargo terminal was also constructed.

=== 21st century ===
A Delta MD-88 at Gate 12

Delta ramp agents shoveling the snow concealing pavement markers during winter operations

In 2001, Bradley international Airport began a major terminal improvement project that included expansion of Terminal A, construction of a new internationals arrival facility, and centralized passenger screening. The project was intended to modernize the airport and improve passenger capacity. The new East Concourse, designed by HNTB, opened in September 2002.

In December 2002, a new International Arrivals Building opened west of the Murphy Terminal, The facility includes a Federal Inspection Station operated by U.S. Customs and Border Protection and the U.S. Department of Agriculture. The Federal Inspection Station can process international arrivals from aircraft as large as a Boeing 747. International arrivals from airports without customs preclearance are processed through the facility.

In July 2007, Northwest Airlines launched nonstop service between Bradley and Amsterdam, the airport's first direct route to Europe. The service ended in October 2008 due to rising fuel costs.

In 2008, Brazilian aerospace manufacturer Embraer selected Bradley as its Executive Jet Maintenance center for the Northeastern United States. The facility opened the same year, temporarily closed during the economic downturn, and reopened in 2011.

On October 21, 2015, Bradley and Aer Lingus announced the return of transatlantic with nonstop flights to Dublin. Service began on September 28, 2016. The route was temporarily suspended in 2020 due to the COVID-19 pandemic before resuming in March 2023. The route is currently operated on a A321LR. The route provides onward connections via Dublin to 28 destinations in the United Kingdom and Europe including Amsterdam, Barcelona, Berlin, London, Madrid, Prague, Rome, and Vienna.

In 2016, an Escape Lounge opened in the East Concourse of Terminal A, near Gates 1–12. The lounge closed in July 2025 for renovation and reopened in February 2026 following an expansion that increased seating capacity and food and beverage offerings, and operating hours.

In 2016, the airport completed demolition of the Murphy Terminal, which had formerly been designated as Terminal B. The International Arrivals Building was subsequently designated as Terminal B.

In 2017, Norwegian Air Shuttle began low-cost transatlantic service from Bradley to Edinburgh using Boeing 737 MAX aircraft. The service ended in March 2018 due to delays in a Scottish tax reduction.

In February 2022, Breeze Airways announced plans to establish an operating base at Bradley International Airport and expand service to multiple domestic destinations. Breeze Airways operates more than 20 nonstop destinations from Bradley International Airport.

In June 2022, a $210 million Ground Transportation Center was opened at the airport following construction during the COVID-19 pandemic. The facility consolidated rental car operations on airport property and added additional covered parking capacity.

In July 2024, Avelo Airlines announced plans to establish an operating base at Bradley International Airport, expanding service to a mix of domestic and international destinations, including Cancun, Montego Bay, and Punta Cana. In October 2025, Avelo announced that it would cease all flight operations from Bradley.

In 2025, the airport constructed two new exit corridors to the east and west sides of Terminal A replacing the former central exit adjacent to the TSA checkpoint, which was closed and reconfigured to expand screening capacity and add additional security lanes. The arrivals levels was also reconfigured with new meet-and-greet areas. As part of a broader modernization program, the airport opened a new approximately 80,000-square-foot in-line baggage screening facility, replacing the former explosive detection equipment located in the Terminal A ticketing area.

In 2026, the airport opened an extension to Terminal A, located above the in-line baggage screening facility, which added a new concourse. The expansion included one relocated gate, two additional gates, expanded passenger facilities, including new seating areas with integrated power access, updated restroom facilities, additional family and nursing rooms, and space for food and retail concessions. The new concourse is exclusively used by Breeze Airways.

=== Future ===
On July 3, 2012, the Connecticut Department of Transportation released an Environmental Assessment and Environmental Impact Evaluation proposing the redevelopment of the former Terminal B area at Bradley. The proposal included the demolition of the Murphy Terminal and existing International Arrivals Building, and the construction of a new Terminal B complex with two concourses totaling 19 gates, including facilities capable of accommodating international widebody aircraft. The plan also included a new Federal Inspection Services facility, a central utility plant, roadway realignments, and a consolidated parking garage and rental car facility.

The proposal was intended to be implemented in multiple hashes, beginning with demolition and infrastructure relocation, followed by phased terminal and roadway construction. Estimated project costs were approximately $630–650 million, with completion ordinally in stages through the 2010s and 2020s.

Although the Murphy Terminal was later demolished, the overall redevelopment plan has not advanced beyond the planning stage, and the International Arrivals Building remains in use.

== Facilities ==
=== Runways and taxiways ===
Bradley International Airport covers 2,432 acres (984 ha) at an elevation of 173 feet (53 m). It has two asphalt runways:

- 6/24: 9,510 by 200 feet (2,899 × 61 m), asphalt
- 15/33: 6,847 by 150 feet (2,087 × 46 m), asphalt

=== Terminals ===
==== Current terminals ====
The airport has two terminals. Terminal A is divided into three concourse areas: Gates 1–12, Gates 18–20, and Gates 21–30. The East Concourse (Gates 1–12) contains 12 gates and is primarily used by Aer Lingus, Delta, Frontier, JetBlue, Southwest, and Sun Country. The West Concourse is split into two sections: Gates 18–20, used by Breeze, and Gates 21–30, used by American, Breeze, and United.

Escape Lounge is a premium common-use airport lounge located in the East Concourse of Terminal A, just before Gate 1. It is the only lounge at Bradley.

The third floor of Terminal A has the administrative offices of the Connecticut Airport Authority.

The International Arrivals Building serves as Terminal B and is used for international flights requiring U.S. Customs and Border Protection processing. It consists of one gate.

==== Former terminal ====
The Murphy Terminal (formerly Terminal B) opened in 1952 and closed to passenger service in 2010. Demolition began in late 2015 and was completed in early 2016. The building previously housed administrative offices for the Connecticut Airport Authority and Transportation Security Administration.

== Airlines and destinations ==
=== Passenger ===
Airlines	Destinations	Refs
Aer Lingus	Dublin	
American Airlines	Charlotte, Chicago–O'Hare, Dallas/Fort Worth, Miami, Washington–National; Seasonal: Philadelphia	
American Eagle	Chicago–O'Hare, Philadelphia, Washington–National	
Breeze Airways	Charleston (SC), Columbus–Glenn, Daytona Beach, Fort Myers, Jacksonville (FL), Las Vegas, New Bern, Norfolk, Pittsburgh, Raleigh/Durham, Richmond, Sarasota, Savannah, Tampa, Vero Beach, Wilmington (NC); Seasonal: Cincinnati, Greensboro, Greenville/Spartanburg, Louisville, Myrtle Beach, Orlando, Phoenix–Sky Harbor	
Delta Air Lines	Atlanta, Detroit, Minneapolis/St. Paul	
Frontier Airlines	Orlando, San Juan	
JetBlue	Fort Lauderdale, Fort Myers, New York–JFK, Orlando, San Juan, West Palm Beach	
Southwest Airlines	Baltimore, Chicago–Midway, Nashville, Orlando, Tampa; Seasonal: Denver, Fort Lauderdale, Fort Myers	
United Airlines	Chicago–O'Hare, Denver, Houston–Intercontinental, San Francisco (begins March 28, 2027), Washington–Dulles	
United Express	Washington–Dulles; Seasonal: Chicago–O'Hare	

=== Cargo ===
Bradley International Airport has shifted its cargo operations from a modest contributor to an explicit pillar of the airport's growth strategy, with significant volume increases in the late 2010s and early 2020s. The airport is pushing to become a key regional cargo hub.

=== Military operations ===
- Connecticut Air National Guard
  - 103rd Airlift Wing (103 AW) "Flying Yankees"
    - 118th Airlift Squadron (118 AS): operates the C-130 Hercules.
- Connecticut Army National Guard
  - 169th Aviation Regiment, 104th Aviation Regiment, 142nd Aviation Regiment.
    - UH-60 Blackhawk, CH-47 Chinook, C-12 Huron
- The Connecticut Wing Civil Air Patrol 103rd Composite Squadron (NER-CT-004) operates out of the airport.

== Statistics ==
=== Aircraft operations ===
In the year ending July 31, 2023, the airport had 77,685 aircraft operations, averaging 213 per day: 71% airline, 16% general aviation, 13% air taxi, and <1% military. At that time, 52 aircraft were based at this airport: 27 jet, 18 military, 5 helicopter, and 2 multi-engine.

=== Top destinations ===
Top 10 Destination Airports (U.S. Only, March 2025 – February 2026)
Rank	Airport	Passengers	Carriers
1	Atlanta, Georgia	327,630	Delta, Frontier
2	Orlando, Florida	293,820	Breeze, Frontier, JetBlue, Southwest
3	Charlotte, North Carolina	244,760	American
4	Chicago–O'Hare, Illinois	222,360	American, United
5	Baltimore, Maryland	208,900	Southwest
6	Denver, Colorado	148,860	Southwest, United
7	Detroit, Michigan	136,930	Delta
8	San Juan, Puerto Rico	127,030	Frontier, JetBlue
9	Washington D.C.	123,280	American
10	Tampa, Florida	121,590	Breeze, JetBlue, Southwest

=== Airline market share ===
Carrier Shares for March 2025 - February 2026
Rank	Airline	Total passengers	Share
1	American Airlines	1,093,000	17.11%
2	Delta Air Lines	1,079,000	16.88%
3	Southwest Airlines	1,076,000	16.84%
4	JetBlue Airways	1,040,000	16.28%
5	Breeze Airways	707,000	11.07%
6	Other	1,394,000	21.82%

=== Annual traffic ===
Year	Enplaned passengers	% change	Aircraft movements	% change
1977	~2,900,000	n/a	~70,000	n/a
2000	3,651,943	▲25.92%	169,736	▲142.48%
2001	3,416,243	▼6.45%	165,029	▼2.77%
2002	3,221,081	▼5.7%	146,592	▼11.17%
2003	3,098,556	▲1.8%	135,246	▼3.8%
2004	3,326,461	▲7.36%	144,870	▲7.11%
2005	3,617,453	▲8.75%	156,090	▲7.7%
2006	3,409,938	▼5.74%	149,517	▼30.3%
2007	3,231,374	▼5.2%	141,313	▼5.48%
2008	3,006,362	▼6.96%	122,837	▼13.0%
2009	2,626,873	▼12.62%	105,594	▼14.03%
2010	2,640,155	▲0.51%	103,516	▼1.96%
2011	2,772,315	▲5.01%	106,951	▼3.31%
2012	2,647,610	▼4.50%	99,019	▼7.41%
2013	2,681,181	▲1.26%	95,963	▼3.08%
2014	2,913,380	▲8.66%	96,477	▲0.53%
2015	2,926,047	▲0.43%	93,507	▼3.07%
2016	3,025,166	▲1.9%	94,748	▲1.32%
2017	3,214,976	▲6.3%	96,312	▲1.65%
2018	3,330,734	▲3.6%		
2019	3,379,093	▲1.4%		
2020	1,208,233	▼64.2%		
2021	2,308,733	▲91.0%		
2022	2,885,124	▲24.97%		
2023	3,118,359	▲8.1%		
2024	3,327,272	▲6.7%		
2025	3,327,905	▲0.01%		

== Ground transportation ==
=== Bus ===
Bus connections
System	Route(s)	Refs
CT Transit Hartford	24,30	

CT Transit provides bus transportation to and from Bradley International Airport through two routes. Route 24 connects the airport with the Windsor Locks train station while Route 30 (Bradley Flyer) provides semi-express service between the airport and Downtown Hartford, including Hartford Union Station and Connecticut Convention Center.

=== Rail ===
Amtrak and CTRail Hartford Line serve both the nearby Windsor Locks and Windsor stations.

== Environment ==
The Connecticut Air National Guard 103rd Airlift Wing leases 144 acres (0.58 km^{2}) in the southwest corner of the airport for their Bradley ANG Base. The base is a designated Superfund site.

Bradley has also been identified as one of the last remaining tracts of grassland in Connecticut suitable for a few endangered species of birds, including the upland sandpiper, the horned lark, and the grasshopper sparrow.

== Awards and recognition ==
In 2017, Bradley International Airport was ranked the fifth-best airport in the United States in the Condé Nast Traveler Readers’ Choice Awards.

In 2018, Bradley International Airport was ranked the third-best airport in the United States in the Condé Nast Traveler Readers’ Choice Awards.

In 2020, Bradley International Airport was ranked among the top ten airports in the United States in the Condé Nast Traveler Readers’ Choice Awards.

In 2021, Bradley International Airport was ranked the third-best airport in the United States in the Condé Nast Traveler Readers’ Choice Awards.

Also in 2021, the airport was named among the top ten “Best Small Airports” in the USA Today 10Best Readers’ Choice Awards.

In 2022, Bradley International Airport was ranked the second-best airport in the United States in the Condé Nast Traveler Readers’ Choice Awards.

In 2023, Bradley International Airport was again recognized as one of the top ten airports in the United States in the Condé Nast Traveler Readers’ Choice Awards.

In 2024, Bradley International Airport was named among the top ten airports in the United States by Condé Nast Traveler for the eighth consecutive year.

== Accidents and incidents ==
- On March 4, 1953, a Slick Airways Curtiss-Wright C-46 Commando N4717N on a cargo flight from New York-Idlewild Field crashed. Bradley was experiencing light rain and a low ceiling at the time of the incident. After being cleared to land on Runway 06, the pilot reported problems intercepting the localizer, and continued to circle down to get under the weather. The plane struck trees approximately 1.6 miles (2.6 km) southwest of the airport, killing the crew of two.
- On January 15, 1959, a USAF Douglas DC-4 impacted a wooded hillside in fog without the use of a compass during approach, the pilot survived, the co-pilot and mechanic were killed.
- On July 16, 1971, a Douglas C-47B N74844 of New England Propeller Service crashed on approach. The aircraft was on a ferry flight to Beverly Municipal Airport, Massachusetts, when an engine lost power shortly after take-off due to water in the fuel. At the time of the accident, the aircraft was attempting to return to Bradley Airport. All three occupants survived.
- On June 4, 1984, a Learjet 23 operated by Air Continental crashed on approach to runway 33 due to asymmetric retraction of the spoilers, two crew and one passenger were killed.
- On May 3, 1991, a Ryan International (wet-leased by Emery Worldwide) Boeing 727-100QC, N425EX, caught fire during take-off. The take-off was aborted and the three crew members escaped while the aircraft was destroyed by the fire. The fire was determined to have started in the number 3 engine. It was determined that the 9th stage HP compressor had ruptured.
- On November 12, 1995, American Airlines Flight 1572 crashed while trying to land at Bradley. The plane, a McDonnell Douglas MD-83, was substantially damaged when it impacted trees while on approach to runway 15 at Bradley International Airport. The airplane also impacted an instrument landing system antenna as it landed short of the runway on grassy, even terrain. The cause of the accident was determined to be the pilot's failure to reset the altimeter, however, severe weather may have played a factor. One of the 78 passengers and five crew on board were injured.
- On October 2, 2019, a vintage Boeing B-17 Flying Fortress owned by the Collings Foundation carrying three crew and ten passengers crashed into deicing tanks and a shed while attempting an emergency landing and caught fire. Seven deaths and seven injuries were reported including one person injured on the ground. Witnesses reported that an engine failed upon takeoff and then the aircraft circled back at low altitude.

== See also ==
- Connecticut World War II Army Airfields
- Hartford–Brainard Airport (HFD)
- FlightSimCon
- Tweed New Haven Airport (HVN)
- Westover Metropolitan Airport (CEF), previously marketed by defunct Skybus Airlines as "Hartford (Chicopee, Massachusetts)"
- Yankee Terminal Radar Approach Control (Y90)
