= Wallingford station (Connecticut) =

Train station in Wallingford, Connecticut, US

Wallingford
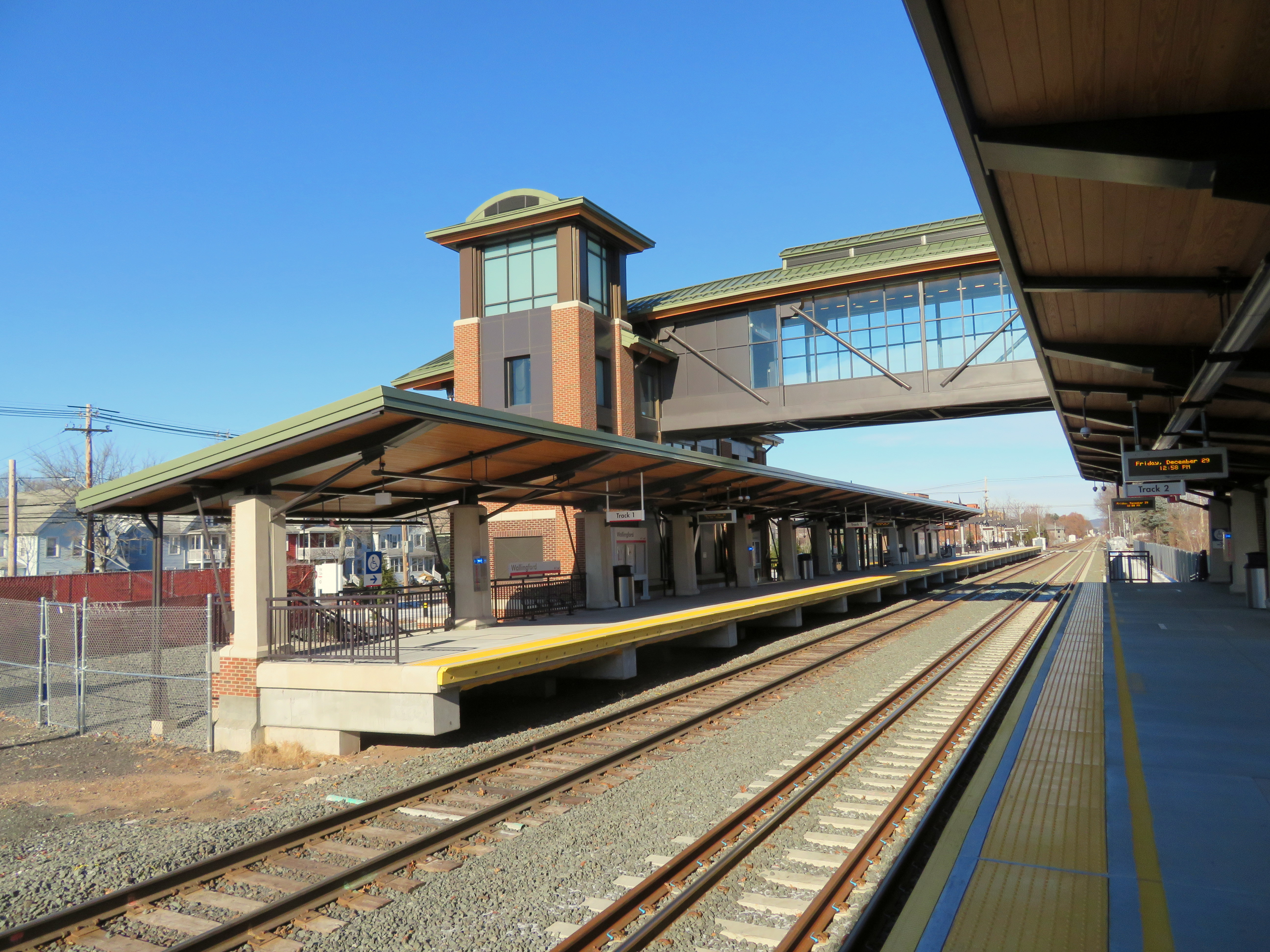
- Wallingford station in December 2017

General information
- Location: 343 North Cherry Street; Wallingford, Connecticut; United States
- Coordinates: 41°27′25″N 72°49′29.5″W
- Owner: ConnDOT
- Line: New Haven–Springfield Line
- Platforms: 2 side platforms
- Tracks: 2
- Connections: CTtransit: 215, 291, 292

Construction
- Parking: 221 spaces
- Cycle facilities: Racks
- Accessible: Yes
- Architect: Michael Baker International

Other information
- Station code: Amtrak: WFD

History
- Opened: December 3, 1838
- Rebuilt: 1871; 2014–2017 (current station)

Passengers
- FY 2025: 12,605 (Amtrak)
Services
Preceding station	Amtrak	Following station
New Haven State Street toward Norfolk, Newport News or Roanoke	Northeast Regional	Meriden toward Springfield
New Haven State Street toward New Haven	Hartford Line	Meriden toward Springfield
New Haven State Street toward New Haven	Valley Flyer	Meriden toward Greenfield
Vermonter does not stop here
Preceding station	CT Rail	Following station
New Haven State Street toward New Haven Union Station	Hartford Line	Meriden toward Springfield
Former services
Preceding station	Amtrak	Following station
New Haven toward Atlantic City	Atlantic City Express 1991–1995	Meriden toward Springfield
New Haven toward Washington, D.C.	Vermonter 2006–2018	Meriden toward St. Albans
- Wallingford Railroad Station
- U.S. National Register of Historic Places
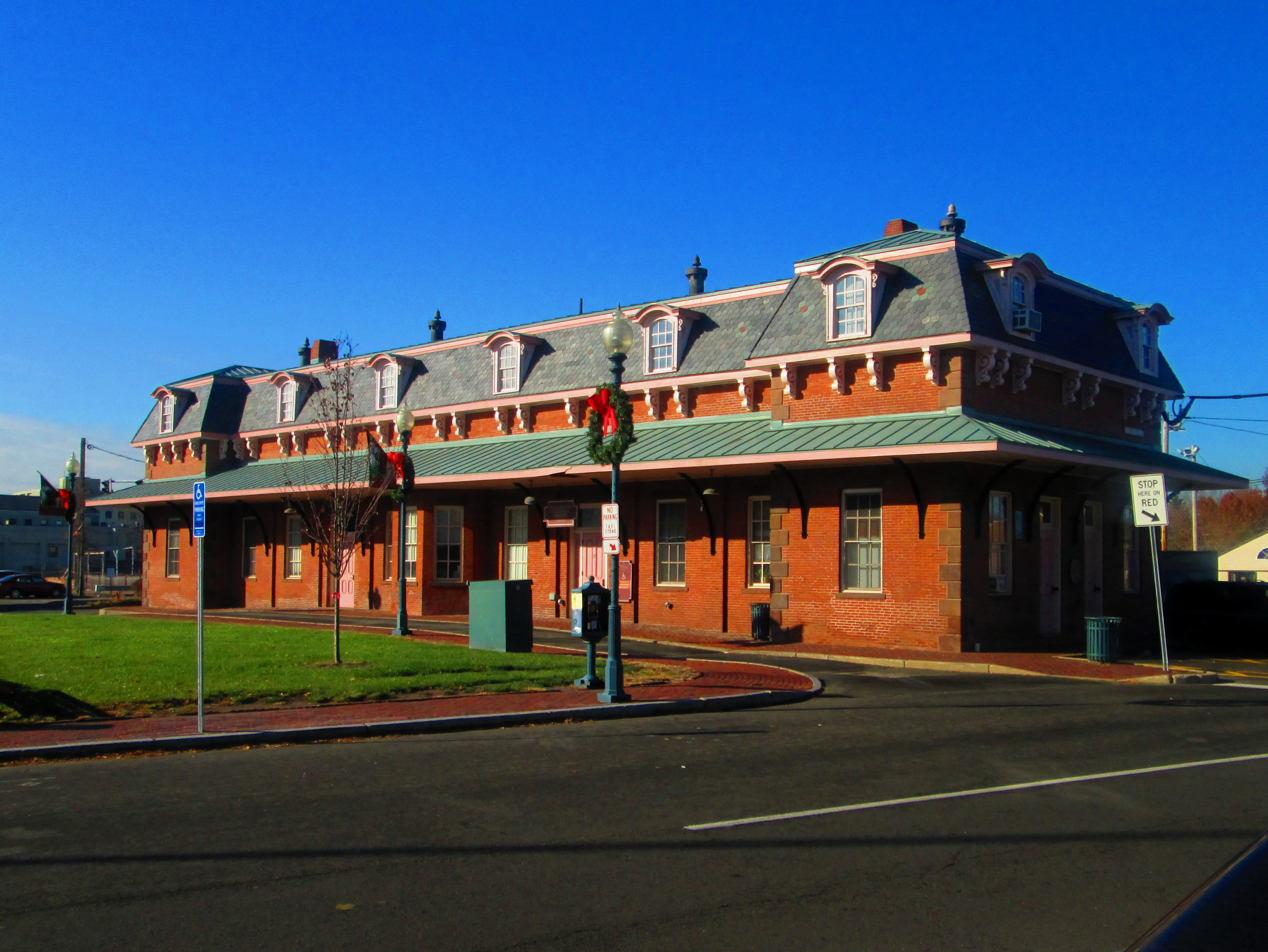
- Wallingford station in November 2013
- Interactive map of Wallingford Railroad Station
- Built: 1871
- Architect: W.P. Dickerman
- Architectural style: Second Empire
- NRHP reference No.: 93001245
- Added to NRHP: November 19, 1993
Location

Wallingford station is a train station on the New Haven–Springfield Line located in Wallingford, Connecticut. It is served by the CT Rail Hartford Line (consisting of Connecticut Department of Transportation and Amtrak trains) and by Amtrak's Northeast Regional, and Valley Flyer. A new station with high-level platforms opened on November 6, 2017 to the north of the original station. The former station building is listed on the National Register of Historic Places as Wallingford Railroad Station.

== History ==
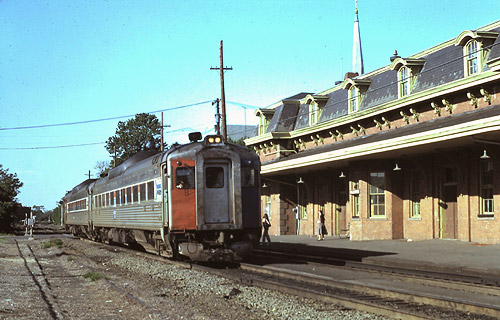
An Amtrak train at Wallingford in 1980

The depot at Wallingford was built in 1871 by the Hartford & New Haven Railroad on the Springfield Line, and was built in a French Second Empire style similar to that of the Windsor train station.

The original station building was closed to the public in 1994 and is now used for adult education and the New Haven Model Railroad Club. The line through Wallingford was double-tracked until 1990 when the second track was removed. The original Wallingford station building has been listed on the National Register of Historic Places since 1993.

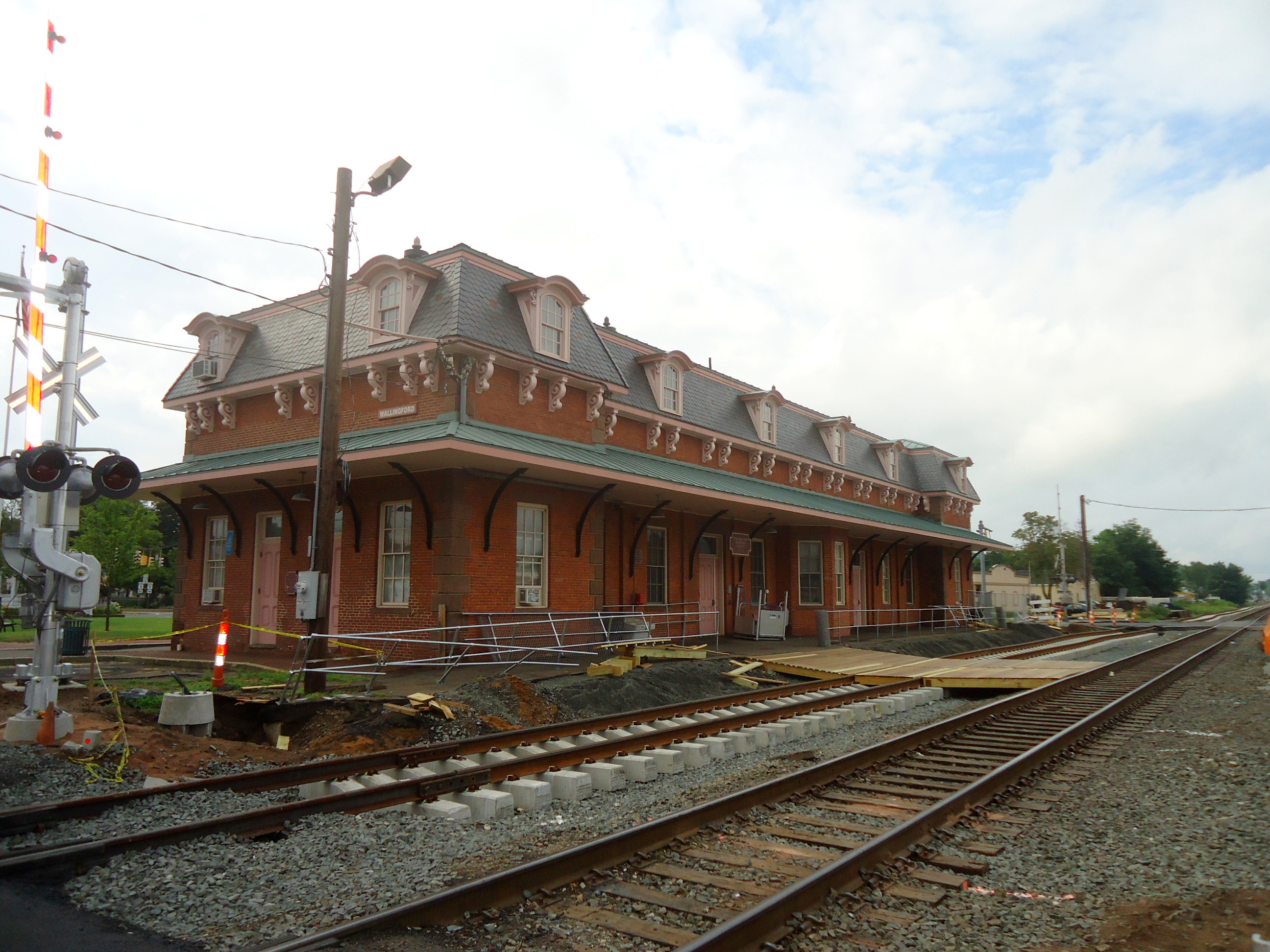
Temporary platform used in mid-2016

A temporary platform replaced the former station platform on April 25, 2016. The temporary platform was used until the new station was completed.

In fall 2016, the Wallingford Planning and Zoning Commission adopted a Transit-Oriented Development Plan, which outlined recommendations for development and infrastructure changes around the station. The existing commercial, industrial zone near the station, as part of the plan, will be replaced with medium- and high-density residential zoning. New commercial and residential development will be encouraged near the station and improvements will be made in the area of the station to connect to downtown Wallingford.

Wallingford has two high-level side platforms serving both tracks, each 6 cars long. The new station, which cost about $21 million to construct, opened on November 6, 2017.

Amtrak's Vermonter stopped serving the Berlin and Wallingford stations on June 9, 2018 due to the addition of Hartford Line service by Amtrak and the Connecticut Department of Transportation.

== See also ==
- National Register of Historic Places listings in New Haven County, Connecticut
