= Grace Church Rectory =

Historic house in Connecticut, United States

- U.S. National Register of Historic Places
- U.S. Historic district – Contributing property
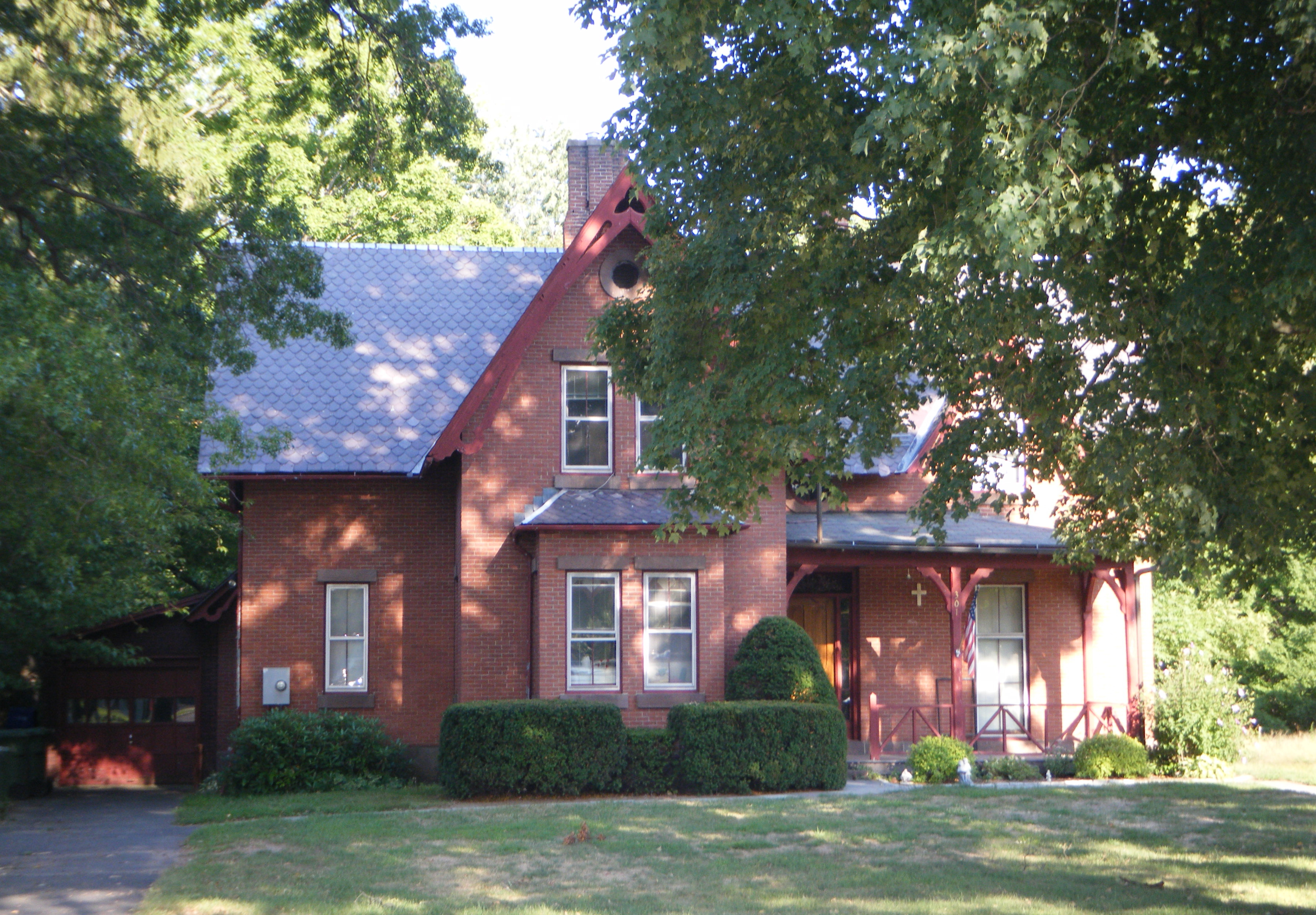

- Location within Connecticut Location within the United States
- Location: 301 Broad Street, Windsor, Connecticut
- Coordinates: 41°50′59″N 72°38′37″W
- Area: 1 acre (0.40 ha)
- Built: 1865
- Architectural style: Gothic Revival
- Part of: Broad Street Green Historic District (ID99001613)
- MPS: 18th and 19th Century Brick Architecture of Windsor TR
- NRHP reference No.: 88001477

Significant dates
- Added to NRHP: September 15, 1988
- Designated CP: December 30, 1999

The former Grace Church Rectory is a historic church rectory and house at 301 Broad Street in Windsor, Connecticut. Built about 1865, it is a good local example of Gothic Revival architecture executed in brick. It was listed the National Register of Historic Places in 1988.

== Description and history ==
The former Grace Church Rectory is located in the town center of Windsor, on the east side of Broad Street, just north of the church itself. It is a 2 1/2-story brick structure with a steeply pitched slate roof. A projecting pavilion in the front is decorated with vergeboard, as are the main entranceway and other gable ends. A single-story porch extends to the right of the pavilion, supported by chamfered posts with Gothic brackets. The main entrance is sheltered by this porch, and is framed by sidelights and a transom window. Gable sections on the building sides continue the Gothic decorations found on the front facade. Windows are set in groups of one to three in size, with stone sills and lintels. A single-story wood frame well extends to the main block's rear.

The house was built about 1865, and is one of the best local examples of Gothic Revival architecture. It was built by the church as a home for its rector, Revel H. Tuttle.

== See also ==
- National Register of Historic Places listings in Windsor, Connecticut
