= Hartford and New Haven Railroad Freight Depot (Windsor, Connecticut) =

- Hartford & New Haven Railroad Freight Depot
- U.S. National Register of Historic Places
- U.S. Historic district – Contributing property
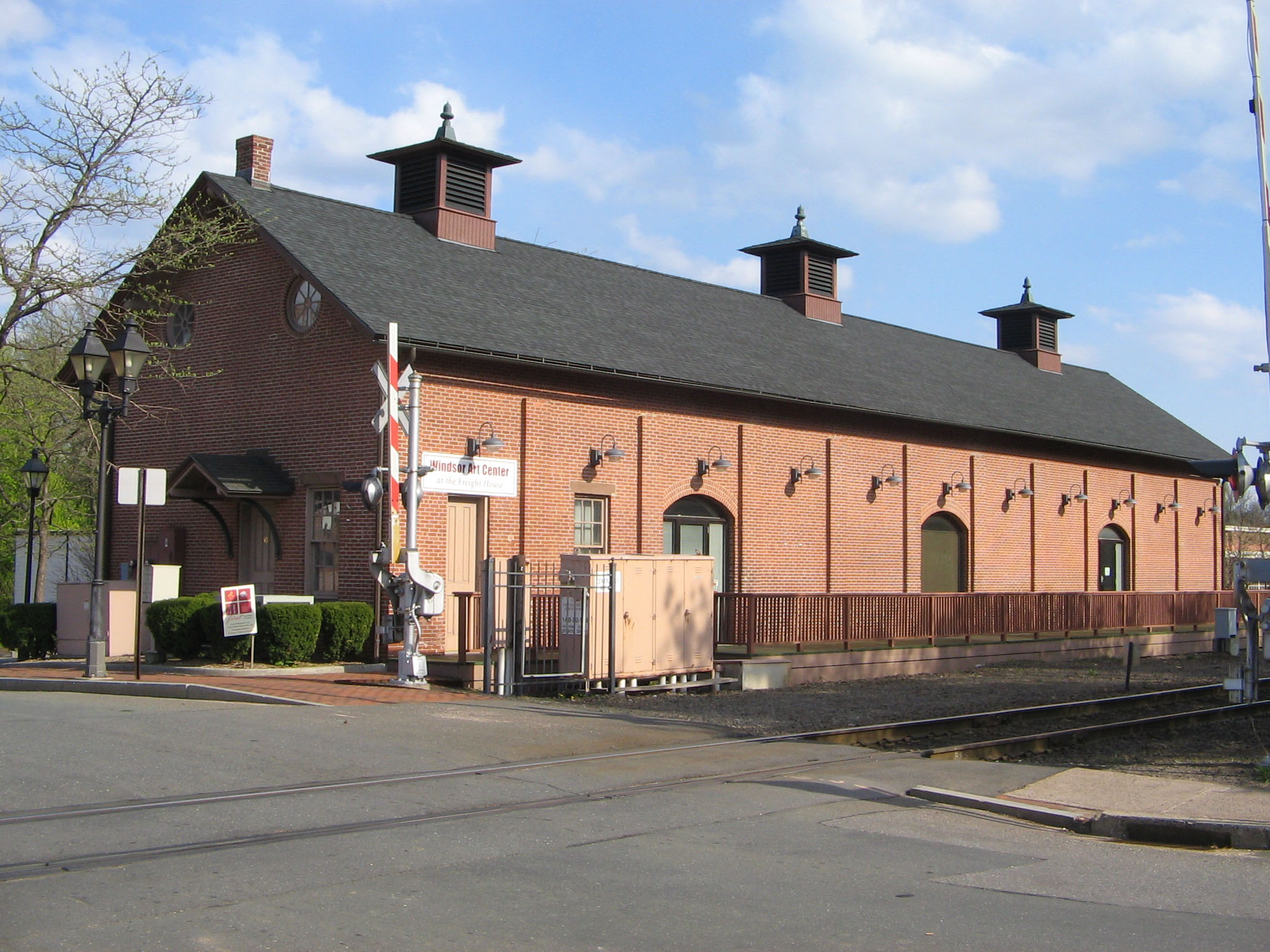
- The Hartford and New Haven Railroad Freight Depot
- Interactive map of Hartford & New Haven Railroad Freight Depot
- Location: 40 Mechanic Street, Windsor, Connecticut
- Coordinates: 41.8519°N 72.6421°W
- Area: less than one acre
- Built: c. 1870
- Architectural style: Gothic Revival
- Part of: Broad Street Green Historic District (ID99001613)
- MPS: 18th and 19th Century Brick Architecture of Windsor TR
- NRHP reference No.: 88001505

Significant dates
- Added to NRHP: September 15, 1988
- Designated CP: December 30, 1999

The Hartford & New Haven Railroad Freight Depot is a historic building at 40 Mechanic Street in downtown Windsor, Connecticut, across the street from the equally historic Hartford & New Haven Railroad Depot. Built about 1870, it is a well-preserved example of a Gothic Revival freight depot. It was listed on the National Register of Historic Places in 1988. It is now the home of the Windsor Arts Center, a non-profit place that exhibits the work of visual and performing artists.

== Description and history ==
The former Hartford & New Haven Railroad Freight Depot is located on the east side of Windsor's downtown area, on the west side of Mechanic Street at its junction with Central Street. It is a long rectangular two-story brick building, set between Mechanic Street and the tracks of the Hartford and New Haven Railroad, now the main line railroad between Hartford, Connecticut and Springfield, Massachusetts. It is located diagonally opposite the tracks and Center Street from the current Amtrak station. It has a largely utilitarian design with some Gothic Revival flourishes. Its roof is topped by square ventilators capped with pyramidal roofs. The present main entrance, on the short end facing Center Street, is sheltered by a gabled bracketed wood-frame hood. The long facades are eleven bays long, articulated by brick piers. Some bays have segmented-arch openings. The roof has extended eaves with exposed rafter and purlin ends.

The construction date of the building is uncertain. A small freight depot is documented as standing on this site in 1869, but it is possible that the current building replaced that one around the time that the adjacent passenger depot was built by the Hartford and New Haven Railroad. Since 2007, the building has housed the Windsor Arts Center.

== See also ==
- National Register of Historic Places listings in Windsor, Connecticut
