= Broad Street Green Historic District =

Historic district in Connecticut, United States

- U.S. National Register of Historic Places
- U.S. Historic district
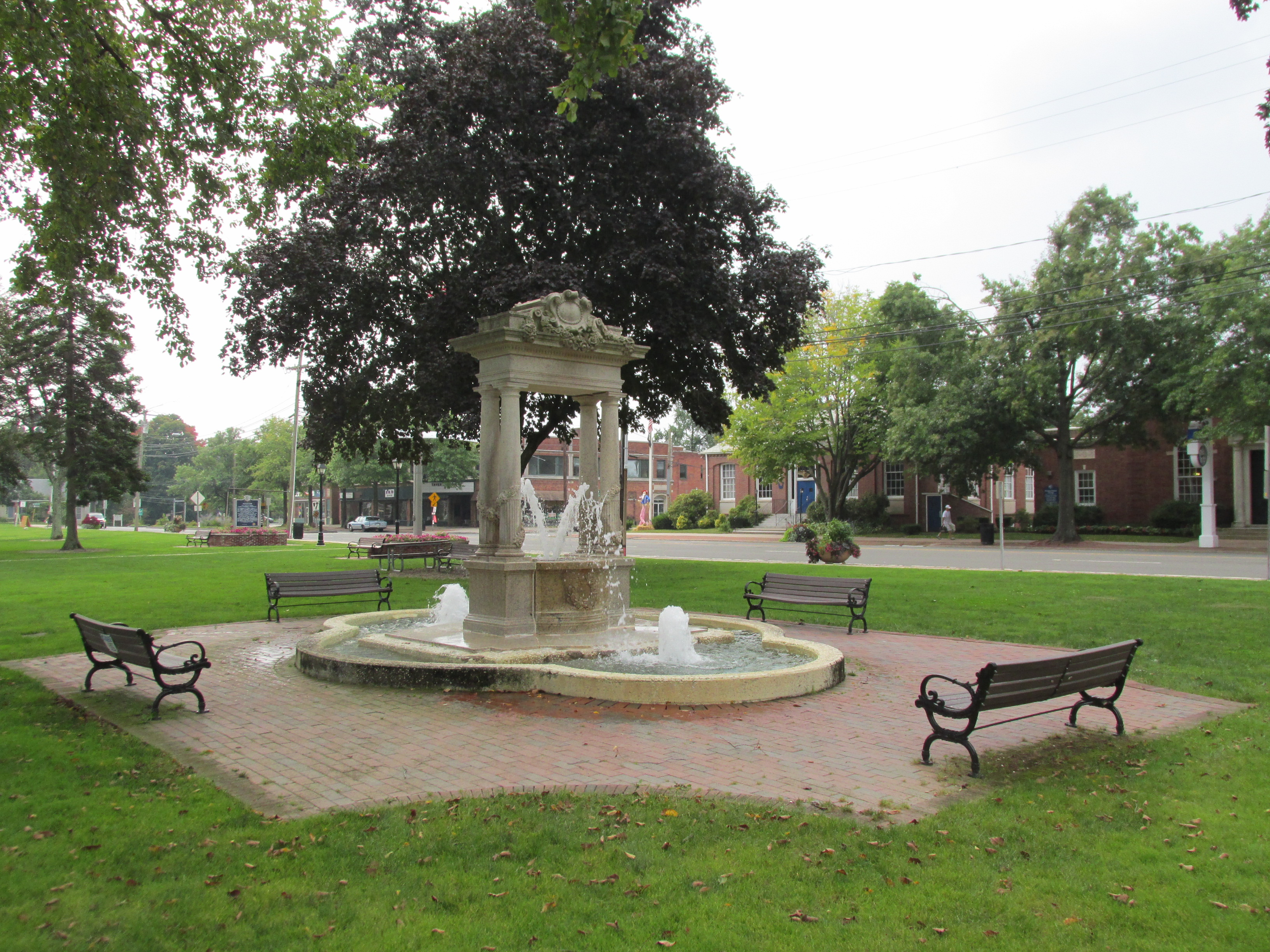
- Fountain, Broad Street Green

- Location within Connecticut Location within the United States
- Location: Roughly along Broad Street, from Batchelder Road to Union Street, Windsor, Connecticut
- Coordinates: 41°51′1″N 72°38′33″W
- Area: 30 acres (12 ha)
- Architectural style: Greek Revival, Gothic Revival
- NRHP reference No.: 99001613
- Added to NRHP: December 30, 1999

The Broad Street Green Historic District encompasses the historic late-19th century town center of Windsor, Connecticut. It is centered around the Broad Street Green, a public park extending on the East Side of Broad Street (Connecticut Route 159) between Union and Batchelder Streets, and includes a diversity of architecture spanning much of the town's long history. It was listed on the National Register of Historic Places in 1999.

== Description and history ==
The town of Windsor was one of the Connecticut's early settlements, dating to 1633. It has historically been centered around the mouth of the Farmington River where it enters the Connecticut River north of Hartford, with its earliest settlement area on the north side. The area to the south of the Farmington River was also a civically important area, serving as later secondary village center. The Broad Street Green was laid out as a common area in the 18th century, and was given its present park-like atmosphere in the late 19th century. The village grew in economic importance during the 19th century, and supplanted the original town center (the Palisado Green area) in civic importance as well. It is now where the town hall and other municipal buildings are located.

The historic district is about 30 acres (12 ha) in size, and includes all of the two dozen or so buildings facing the green between Batchelder and Union Streets. It also includes a few buildings on Union and Central Streets, just east of the green, extending down to the railroad tracks, where the historic station is included. Important civic buildings include the town hall, fire station, post office, and library. The library is partially housed in the Oliver Mather House, the district's oldest surviving building (1777). There are several two and three-story brick commercial blocks lining part of the green's west side.

== Contributing properties ==
- Grace Church Rectory (1865)
- Hartford & New Haven Railroad Depot (1870)
- Hartford & New Haven Railroad-Freight Depot (1870)
- Col. James Loomis House (1822)

== See also ==
- National Register of Historic Places listings in Windsor, Connecticut
