= Windsor station (Connecticut) =

Rail station in Windsor, Connecticut, US

Windsor
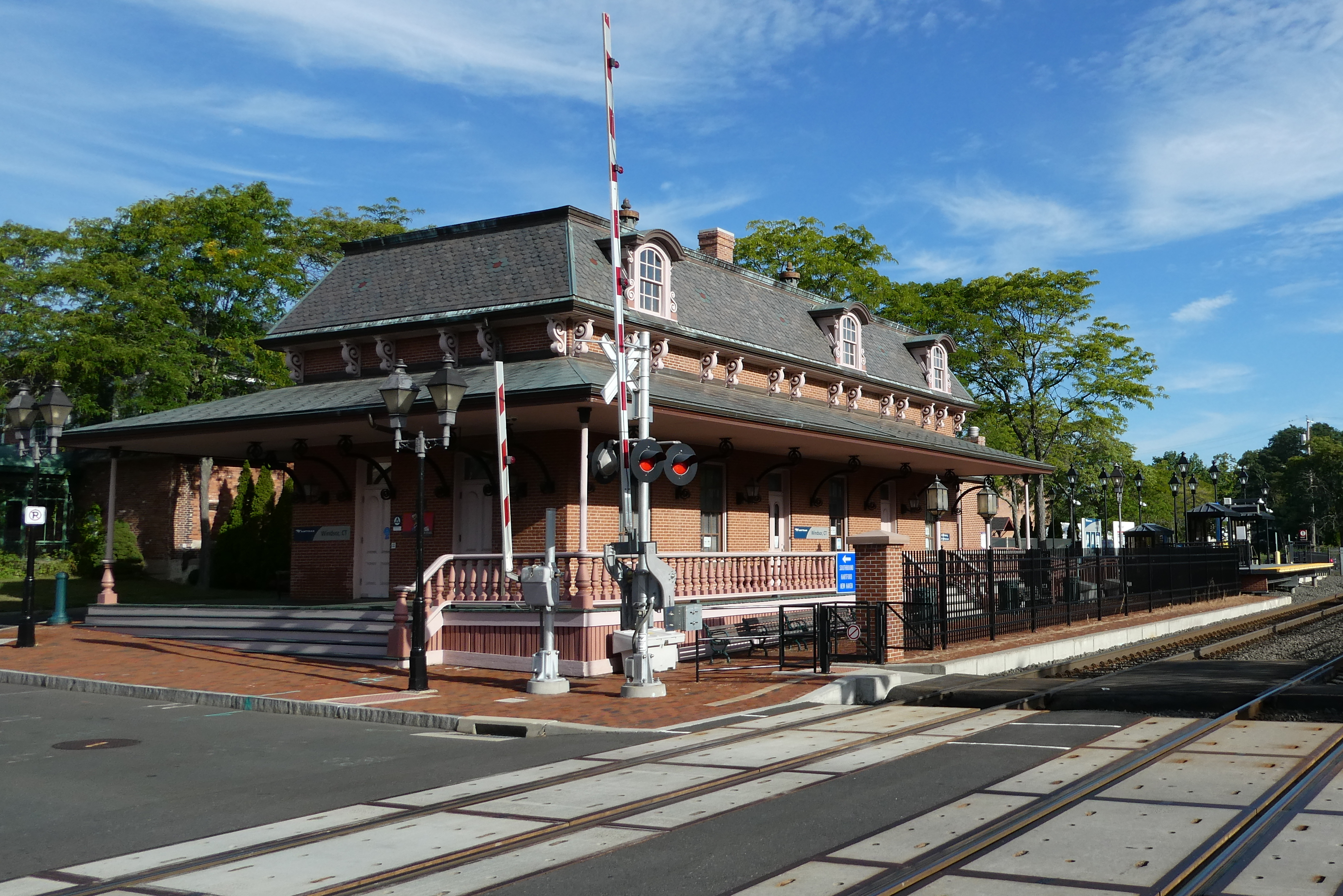
- Windsor station in September 2022

General information
- Location: 41 Central Street; Windsor, Connecticut; United States
- Coordinates: 41°51′07.5″N 72°38′32″W
- Owner: Amtrak
- Line: New Haven–Springfield Line
- Platforms: 2 side platforms
- Tracks: 2
- Connections: CTtransit: 32, 34, 36

Construction
- Parking: 22 spaces (free)
- Cycle facilities: No
- Accessible: Yes

Other information
- Station code: Amtrak: WND

History
- Opened: 1870
- Rebuilt: 1988

Passengers
- FY 2025: 21,054 (Amtrak)

Services
| Preceding station | Amtrak | Following station |
|---|---|---|
| Hartford toward Norfolk, Newport News or Roanoke | Northeast Regional | Windsor Locks toward Springfield |
| Hartford toward New Haven | Hartford Line | Windsor Locks toward Springfield |
| Hartford toward New Haven | Valley Flyer | Windsor Locks toward Greenfield |
Vermonter does not stop here
| Preceding station | CT Rail | Following station |
| Hartford toward New Haven Union Station | Hartford Line | Windsor Locks toward Springfield |
Former services
| Preceding station | Amtrak | Following station |
|---|---|---|
| Hartford toward Atlantic City | Atlantic City Express 1991–1995 | Windsor Locks toward Springfield |
- Hartford & New Haven Railroad Depot
- U.S. National Register of Historic Places
- U.S. Historic district – Contributing property
- Interactive map of Hartford & New Haven Railroad Depot
- Architectural style: Second Empire
- Part of: Broad Street Green Historic District (ID99001613)
- MPS: 18th and 19th Century Brick Architecture of Windsor TR
- NRHP reference No.: 88001479

Significant dates
- Added to NRHP: September 15, 1988
- Designated CP: December 30, 1999
Location

Windsor station is a historic railroad station on Amtrak's New Haven–Springfield Line, located in downtown Windsor, Connecticut. It is served by Amtrak Northeast Regional and Valley Flyer intercity service and CT Rail's Hartford Line commuter rail service. The nearby Hartford & New Haven Railroad-Freight Depot serves as the home of the Windsor Arts Center.

== History ==
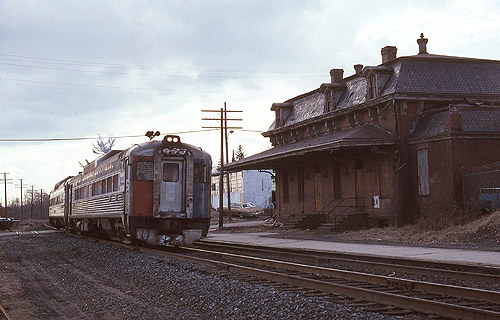
An Amtrak train at Windsor in 1980

Windsor Station was originally built in 1870 as the Hartford & New Haven Railroad Depot and rebuilt to its original Victorian architecture by Town of Windsor, Amtrak and the Greater Hartford Transit District in 1988, the same year it was listed on the National Register of Historic Places.

In February 2017, the state announced an additional $50 million in funds, including money to complete design of the rebuilt Windsor station. Design will be completed by 2020; the platforms will be moved slightly, and a parking deck built nearby.

Hartford Line commuter service commenced on June 16, 2018. A second low-level platform was opened on September 14, 2018, and the track one platform was temporarily closed until September 24 for track work.

The Connecticut Department of Transportation has proposed that the existing historic station be moved to a new site approximately 500 feet to the south of the existing station. If this occurs the existing station would be expanded to include high-level platforms on both sides of the tracks, as well as the installation of elevators, stairways, an overhead pedestrian bridge to cross the tracks.

== See also ==
- National Register of Historic Places listings in Windsor, Connecticut
- Wallingford, Connecticut, Amtrak station – a station with a similar design
