= Col. James Loomis House =

Historic house in Connecticut, United States

- U.S. National Register of Historic Places
- U.S. Historic district – Contributing property
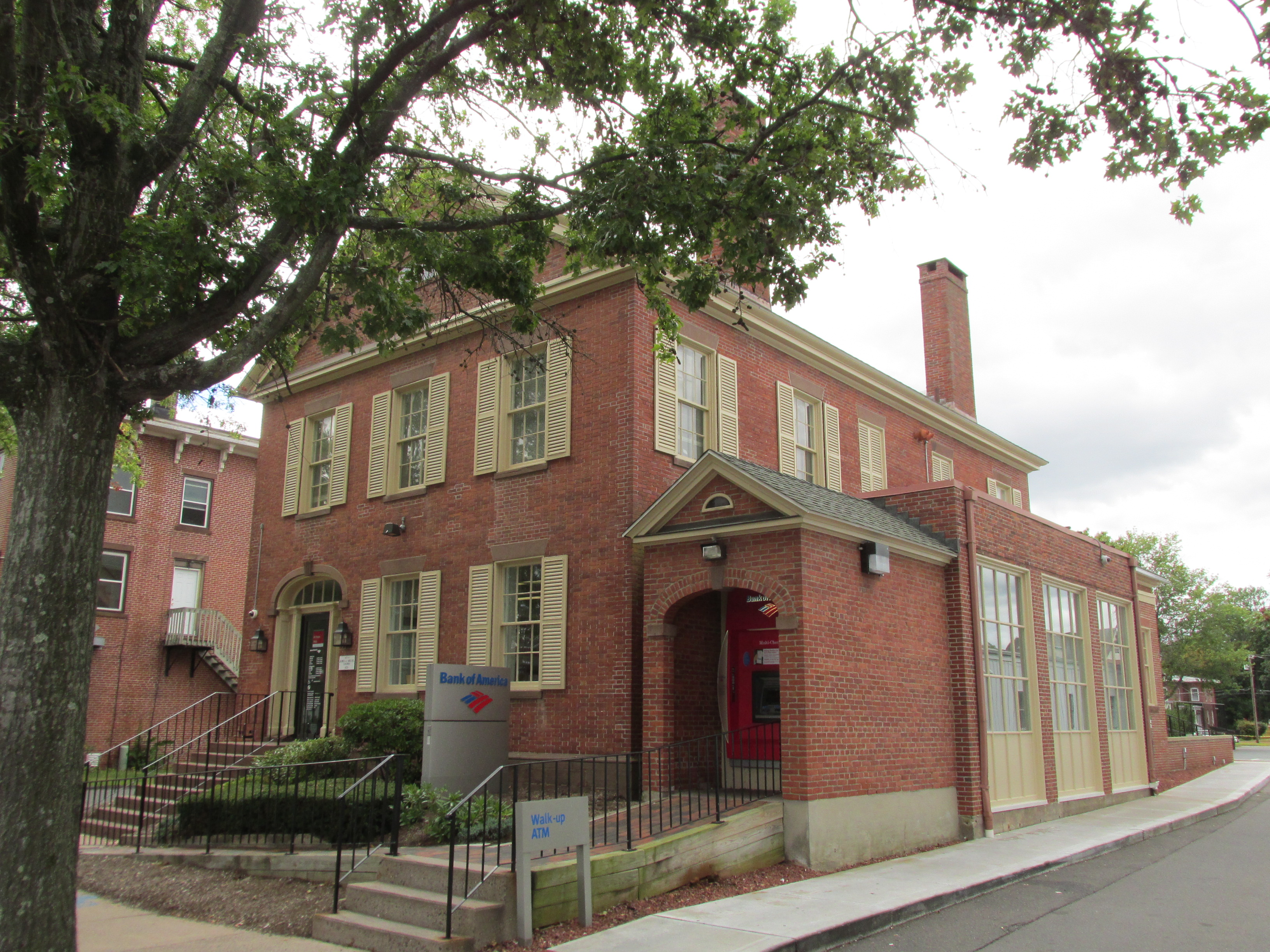

- Location within Connecticut Location within the United States
- Location: 208-210 Broad Street, Windsor, Connecticut
- Coordinates: 41°51′7″N 72°38′41″W
- Area: 0.8 acres (0.32 ha)
- Built: 1822
- Architectural style: Federal
- Part of: Broad Street Green Historic District (ID99001613)
- MPS: 18th and 19th Century Brick Architecture of Windsor TR
- NRHP reference No.: 88001476

Significant dates
- Added to NRHP: September 15, 1988
- Designated CP: December 30, 1999

The Colonel James Loomis House is a historic house at 208-210 Broad Street in Windsor, Connecticut. Built in 1822 for a prominent local family, it is a good local example of Federal architecture executed in brick. It was listed on the National Register of Historic Places in 1988.

== Description and history ==
The Colonel James Loomis House is located in the village center of Windsor, on the west side of the Broad Street Green, between Poquonock Avenue and Maple Avenue. It is a 2 1/2-story brick building, with a gabled roof. Its street-facing main facade is three bays wide, with the main entrance in the left bay, topped by a half-oval fanlight window. Windows in the other bays are set in rectangular openings, with stone sills and splayed stone lintels. The gable above is fully pedimented, with a half-oval fanlight at the center. Sympathetic modern additions have been made to the right side of the building as part of its conversion to a commercial space.

The house was built in 1822 by James Loomis, who at the time operated the town's only store directly adjacent. Loomis was one of many descendants of Joseph Loomis, one of Windsor's first colonial settlers, and his children were instrumental in the founding of The Loomis Chaffee School.

== See also ==
- National Register of Historic Places listings in Windsor, Connecticut
