= Windsor Locks station =

Train station in Windsor Locks, Connecticut, US

Windsor Locks
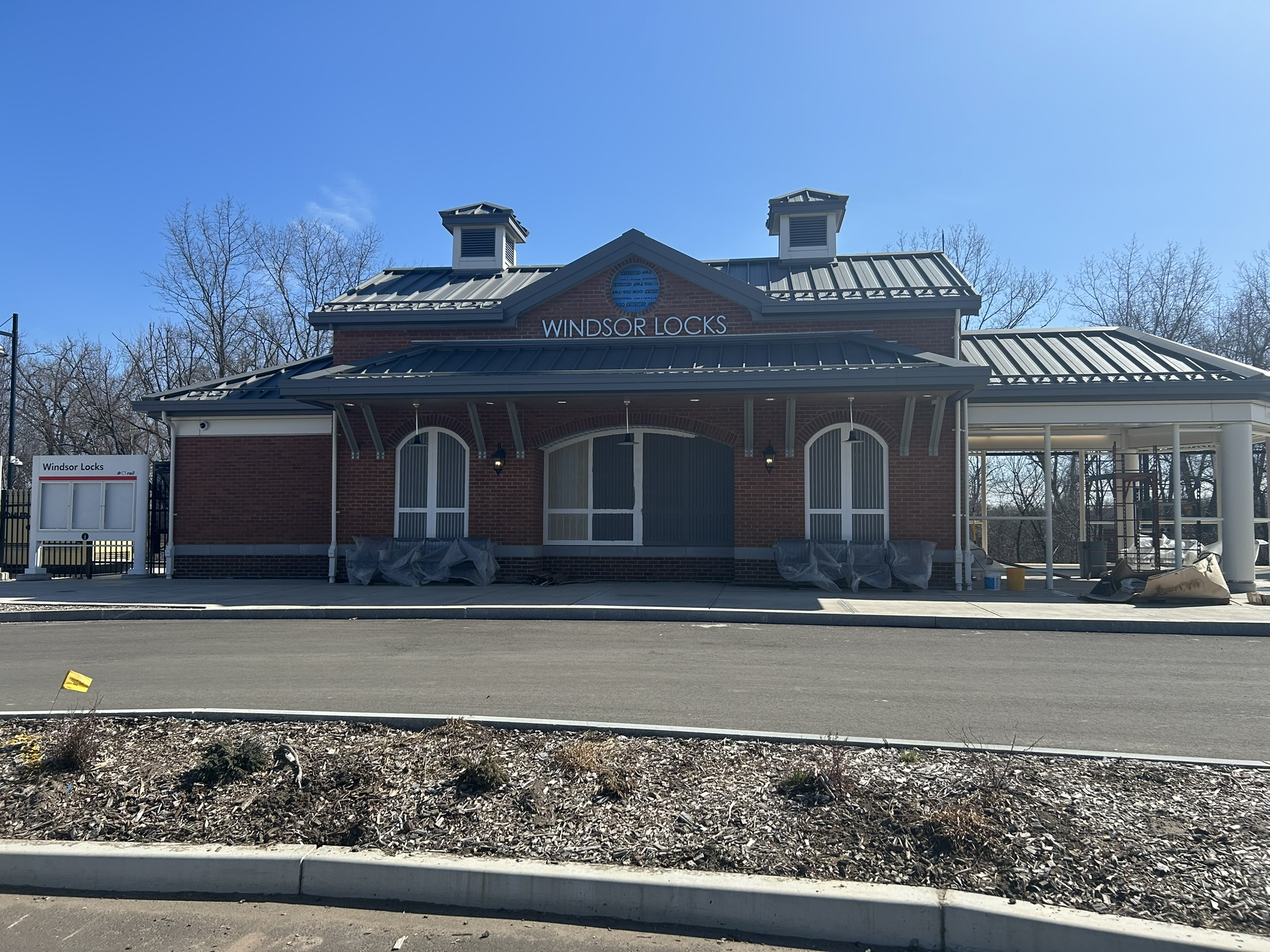
- The station under construction in 2026

General information
- Location: 229 Main Street; Windsor Locks, Connecticut; United States
- Coordinates: 41.9328°N 72.62746°W
- Line: New Haven–Springfield Line
- Platforms: 1 side platform
- Tracks: 1
- Connections: CTtransit Hartford: 24, 96, 905

Construction
- Parking: 160 spaces
- Accessible: Yes

Other information
- Station code: Amtrak: WNL

History
- Opened: c. 1844
- Rebuilt: 1859, 1875, 1981, 2026

Passengers
- FY 2025: 32,655 (Amtrak)
Services
Preceding station	Amtrak	Following station
Windsor toward Norfolk, Newport News or Roanoke	Northeast Regional	Springfield Terminus
Windsor toward New Haven	Hartford Line	Springfield Terminus
Windsor toward New Haven	Valley Flyer	Springfield toward Greenfield
Hartford toward Washington, D.C.	Vermonter	Springfield toward St. Albans
Preceding station	CT Rail	Following station
Windsor toward New Haven Union Station	Hartford Line	Springfield Terminus
Former services
Preceding station	Amtrak	Following station
Windsor toward Atlantic City	Atlantic City Express 1991–1995	Springfield Terminus
- Windsor Locks Passenger Station
- U.S. National Register of Historic Places
- Location: 225 Main Street; Windsor Locks, Connecticut
- Coordinates: 41.93187°N 72.62748°W
- NRHP reference No.: 75001937
Location

Windsor Locks station is an Amtrak and CT Rail train station in Windsor Locks, Connecticut, on the New Haven–Springfield Line. It is served by four Amtrak intercity services – the Hartford Line, Northeast Regional, Valley Flyer, and Vermonter – as well as CT Rail Hartford Line commuter rail trains.

The first station in Windsor Locks opened in the mid-1840s on the Hartford and New Haven Railroad. It was rebuilt in 1859 and again in 1875. The latter building was listed on the listed on the National Register of Historic Places as Windsor Locks Passenger Station in 1975. Amtrak opened a new station south of the downtown area in 1981. A new station, adjacent to the historic station in the center of Windsor Locks, opened on October 18, 2026.

== History ==
=== Previous stations ===
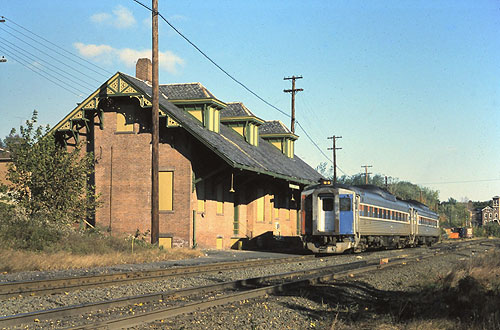
An Amtrak train at the 1875-built station in 1979

The Hartford and New Haven Railroad opened the Hartford and Springfield Railroad – an extension north from Hartford, Connecticut, to Springfield, Massachusetts – in December 1844. A station in the manufacturing village of Windsor Locks was open by 1846. (Note: Windsor Locks was part of Windsor until being incorporated in 1854.) The combination depot, which handled both passengers and freight, was located on the east side of Main Street north of Oak Street. The two railroads merged in 1845 as the New Haven, Hartford and Springfield Railroad; the name reverted to Hartford and New Haven Railroad in 1847.

In 1859, the railroad constructed a new station about 100 feet (30 m) north at Grove Street. The Windsor Locks and Suffield Railroad was formed in 1868 to build a branch line between Windsor Locks and Suffield. The 5-mile (8.0 km) line opened on December 12, 1870. It was operated by the Hartford and New Haven, and was formally merged into that company in 1871. The branch separated from the main line north of downtown Windsor Locks. The Hartford and New Haven merged with the New York and New Haven Railroad in 1872 to become the New York, New Haven and Hartford Railroad (New Haven). The New Haven built a new station in the town center in 1875. The station building was closed by Penn Central in 1971; Penn Central and later Amtrak passengers continued to use the platform, but Penn Central used the interior as a signal workshop. Penn Central later attempted to demolish the station, but a local group succeeded in having it listed on the National Register of Historic Places in 1975. Amtrak bought the Springfield Line infrastructure, including the "remarkably intact" station, in 1976. Service moved to a new site – a new park and ride stop just south of Interstate 91 – in 1981.

=== Planning ===
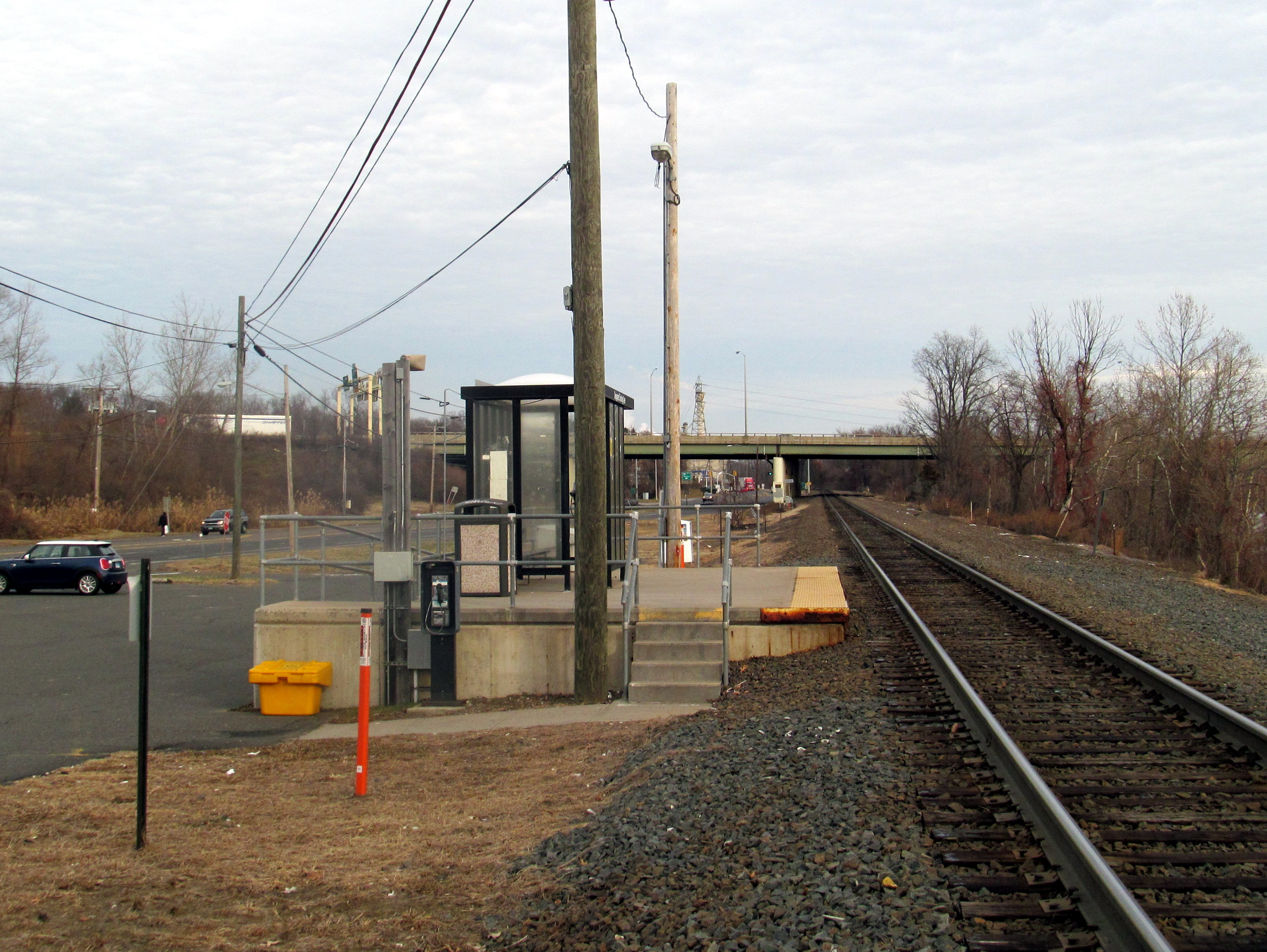
The 1981-built station in 2015

The 2004 Recommended Action of the New Haven Hartford Springfield Commuter Rail Implementation Study included the construction of a new Windsor Locks station on the existing south-of-downtown site. A single high-level platform was to be constructed, with a pedestrian bridge leading to an added parking area on the west side of South Main Street. A second platform serving a restored second track would have been added later.

However, local preference was to move the station stop back to the original downtown site. Spurred by a 2000 arson that damaged the structure, the Windsor Locks Preservation Association (WLPA) was formed in 2004 to support repair and reuse of the building. By 2007, the WLPA and the town had secured $274,000 of the estimated $700,000 to purchase and repair the station, and serious consideration was being given to moving the Amtrak stop there as well. However, after years of unsuccessful negotiations about the sale and future use, the WLPA disbanded in 2011. The town took over negotiations and purchased the station from Amtrak in December 2014. In 2015, the town began planning renovations of the station building for future use as a "shared workspace".

Hartford Line plans from 2012 included two possible station sites: one at the existing station with an enlargement of the current parking lot, and one at the former location with a new parking lot. Either location would have 500-foot (150 m)-long high level platforms serving the current track plus a restored second track, with a pedestrian bridge connecting the two platforms. Funding for the new station and second track were not included in initial Hartford Line funding. Service started on June 16, 2018, using the existing station. In February 2017, the state announced an additional $50 million in funds, including money to complete design of the relocated Windsor Locks station. Design work was to be completed by 2020.

By September 2019, the state planned for the station replacement to be a $65 million project. A 510-foot (160 m)-long high-level platform, brick shelter, and parking lot would be built at the downtown site, just north of the former station building. A 5,000-foot (1,500 m)-long passing siding would be built, and the connection to the Suffield Branch reconfigured. A new maintenance-of-way yard would be built at the existing station site. The project also included the reconstruction of Route 159 between Bridge Street and the station, including a multi-use path to connect with the Windsor Locks Canal State Park Trail at Bridge Street. Construction was anticipated to start in late 2020 and be completed in late 2023.

=== Construction ===
The new station under construction in 2025

In February 2020, the state received a $17.4 million federal grant for the project. Demolition of a nearby structure began in March 2020. The state approved $45 million in bonds for the project in April 2020. The town plans for transit-oriented development adjacent to the station, including a public market and apartment buildings. The town was awarded $130,000 in December 2020 for restoration of the station building. In March 2021, the town reached an agreement with a developer to restore the building for use as a welcome center, cafe, and brewery.

Bidding for the project began in November 2021. Construction began in September 2022 and is expected to be complete in mid-2025, with a total project cost of $87 million. In September 2023, the state awarded the town $4.8 million to restore the station building and add bathrooms, as well as to acquire an adjacent strip mall property for eventual construction of transit-oriented housing. Some weekday service between Hartford and Springfield was replaced with buses from April 22 to October 31, 2025, to accommodate construction of the new station. Partial service replacement resumed on April 21, 2026, to support track improvement around the station, and is expected to last through October 2026. The new station opened on October 18, 2026.
