= Amtrak Hartford Line =

Amtrak service between Springfield, MA and New Haven, CT

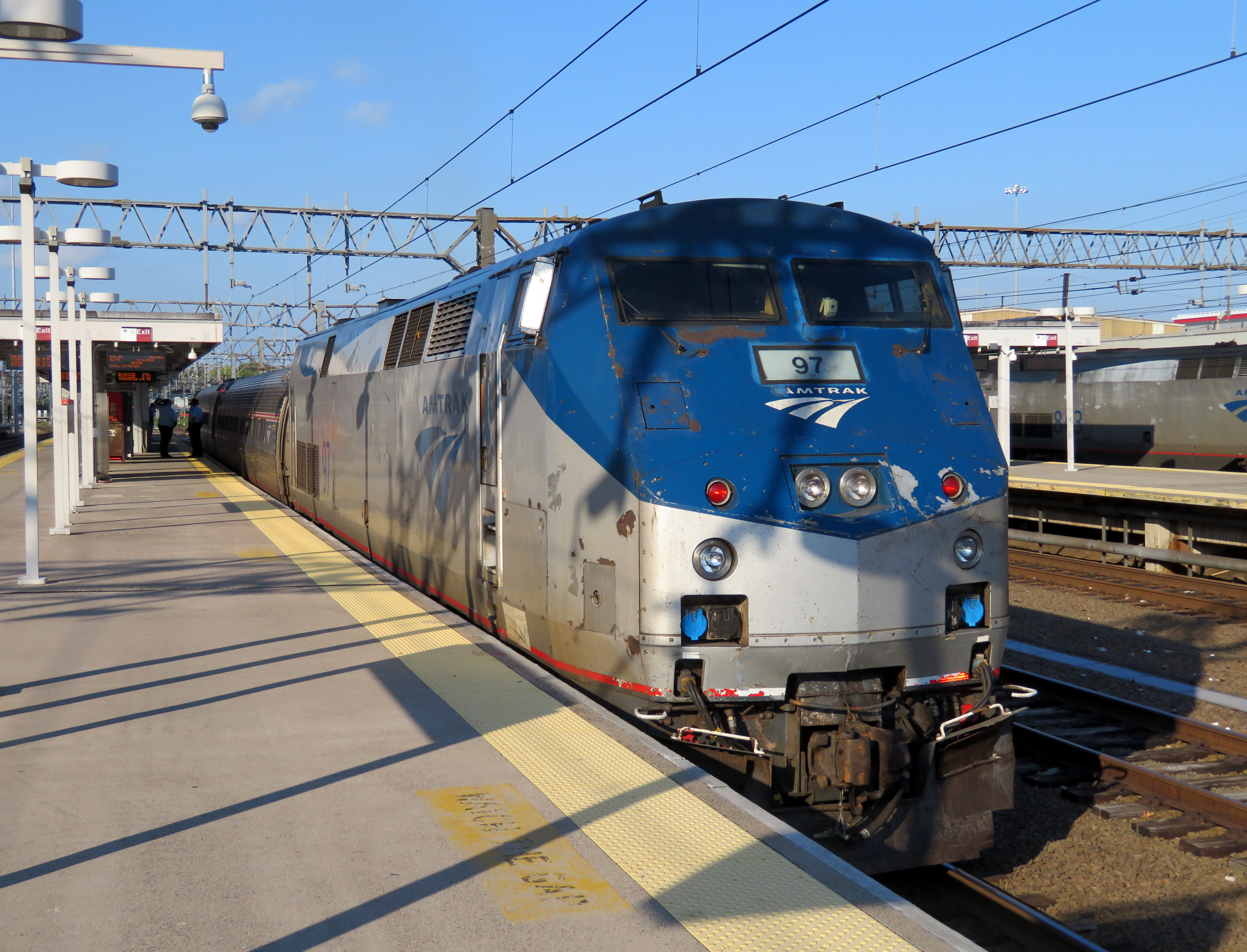
- Shuttle train at New Haven Union Station in 2018

Overview
- Service type: Inter-city rail
- Status: Operating
- Locale: Connecticut and Massachusetts
- Current operators: Amtrak in partnership with CTDOT and MassDOT
- Annual ridership: 474,990 (FY 25) ▼ -17.7% (Note: Amtrak's Fiscal Year (FY) runs from October 1 of the prior year to September 30 of the named year.)

Route
- Termini: Springfield, Massachusetts; New Haven, Connecticut
- Stops: 9
- Distance travelled: 62 miles (100 km)
- Average journey time: 1 hour, 20-25 minutes
- Service frequency: 14 weekday trips 8 Saturday trips 11 Sunday trips
- Train number: 405, 409, 416, 417, 450, 460, 463-465, 467, 470, 473-475, 478, 490, 495, 497

Technical
- Rolling stock: GE Genesis locomotives, Amfleet coach cars, and Ex-Metroliner cab cars
- Track gauge: 4 ft 8 1/2 in (1,435 mm) standard gauge
- Operating speed: 110 mph (180 km/h)
- Track owner: Amtrak

The Amtrak Hartford Line is a train service run by Amtrak primarily between Springfield, Massachusetts, and New Haven, Connecticut, along Amtrak's New Haven–Springfield Line.

Prior to the addition of the Valley Flyer and the Northeast Regional thru trains, the service was known as the New Haven–Springfield Shuttle, or simply, the Shuttle. The line was renamed in September 2019. Today the service is a component of and shares its name with the Hartford Line commuter rail service operated by the Connecticut Department of Transportation.

During fiscal year (FY) 2023, the service carried 442,028 riders, an increase of 36.3% from FY 2022. The increase in ridership was primarily due to recovery from the impact of the COVID-19 pandemic on tourism.

The service is financially supported by the Connecticut Department of Transportation and Massachusetts Department of Transportation.

== History ==
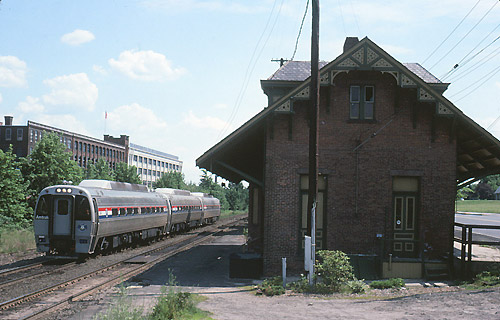
A shuttle train of Budd SPV-2000 stock at Windsor Locks in 1980

As inherited from Penn Central in 1971, most service on the Springfield Line consisted of unnamed Budd Rail Diesel Car shuttles that connected with Northeast Corridor trains at New Haven, with limited through service to New York City. In 1980, Connecticut invested $12 million to improve service on the line. North Haven station was opened on October 25, 1980, and other stations were renovated. A new fleet of 12 Budd SPV-2000 diesel railcars allowed an increase to 12 daily round trips under the Connecticut Valley Service name (plus two through trips) at that time. However, service was cut in half in 1981 after ridership failed to increase.

On January 12, 1986, Amtrak pulled the unreliable SPVs from the line and replaced them with Amfleet coaches pulled by diesel locomotives. North Haven and Enfield stations were closed on October 25, 1986 due to low ridership. As New Haven was the northern limit of electrification on the Northeast Corridor, New York–Boston trains changed between electric and diesel locomotives at the station. The passenger coaches of Springfield shuttle trains were attached to southbound trains during the engine change, and detached from northbound trains; this eliminated the need for passengers to change trains. The Connecticut Valley Service name was soon dropped, and shuttle trains were named in timetables as sections of their connecting trains. The elimination of the second track on the line beginning in 1990 sharply reduced capacity, limiting frequencies to four daily shuttle round trips plus several through trips.

On October 28, 1995, most Northeast Corridor service including the shuttle trains were consolidated under the NortheastDirect brand. Electrification was extended to Boston in 2000, and engine changes were eliminated over the next two years. The cumbersome split/merge procedure was abandoned in favor of dedicated shuttle trains with cross-platform connections to through trains. The shuttle trains began to use ex-Budd Metroliner cab cars, which had become available when replaced by new equipment on West Coast routes. This allowed them to operate in push–pull format, eliminating the need to wye or loop the trainsets at New Haven and Springfield. The NortheastDirect name was dropped in September 2001; Northeast Corridor trains became the Acela Regional (later Regional then Northeast Regional), while the shuttle trains became unnamed. They remained unnamed until 2019 when they received the Hartford Line and Valley Flyer names.

=== Mail service ===
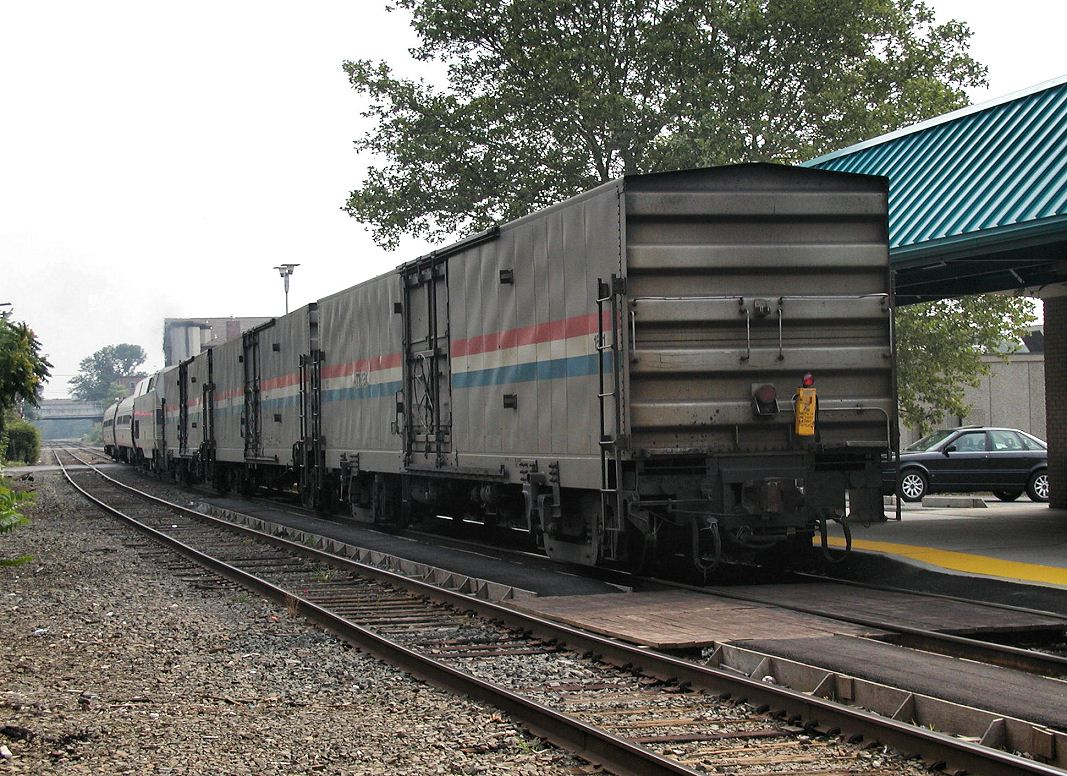
Mail cars on Shuttle Train 490 at Meriden in 2002

Until Amtrak discontinued all mail-hauling operations in 2005, the postal distribution center in Springfield, MA was a significant customer. Up until about the year 2000, Springfield was served by a dedicated mail train which would run overnight up the Inland Route to Springfield. After this train was canceled, mail cars were instead added to the early morning Train 190, to make pickups at large cities along the Northeast Corridor. At New Haven these mail cars would be removed from the rear of Train 190 and added to Shuttle Train 490, sometimes sandwiching the locomotive in the middle of the train.

=== Hartford Line expansion ===
Until August 2015, daily service in each direction on the Springfield Line consisted of four Shuttles, the Vermonter, and one or two Northeast Regional trains. Between August 3, 2015 and December 31, 2017, several round trips on weekdays were replaced by buses to accommodate double track construction for the ConnDOT Hartford Line commuter rail service. On June 9, 2018, three additional weekday Shuttle round trips were added as part of the startup of Hartford Line service. This change also added connections with some Amtrak Acela Express service in New Haven.

Hartford Line began on June 16, 2018. Initial Hartford Line service consisted of eight weekday round trips (four New Haven–Hartford and four New Haven–Springfield) and nine weekend round trips (six New Haven–Hartford and three New Haven–Springfield). On September 10, 2018, as part of a schedule change made to Hartford Line trains, all Amtrak Shuttles and Northeast Regionals started stopping at New Haven's State Street station. (The Vermonter makes only limited stops between New Haven and Springfield.)

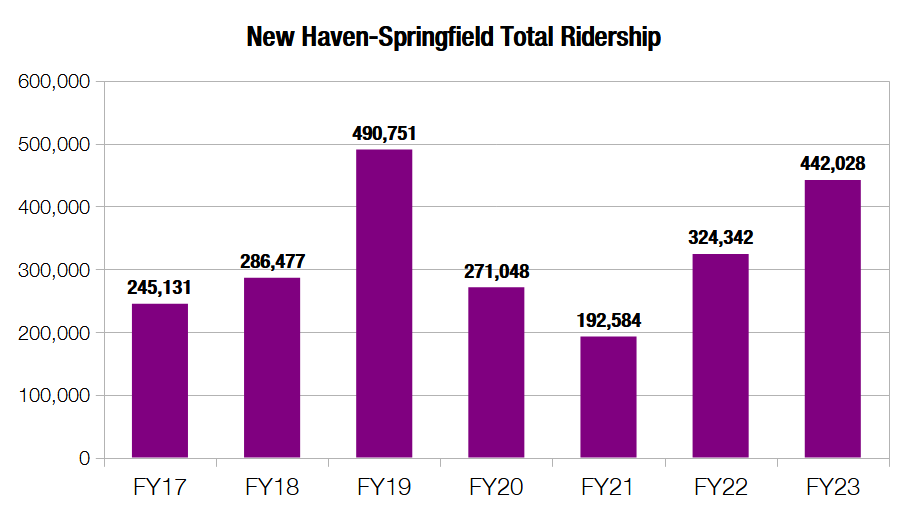
New Haven–Springfield Total Ridership by Year (FY17-FY23)

Amtrak adopted the Hartford Line name for use on the trains it operates on the corridor and retired the Shuttle designation in September 2019. Service was reduced in 2020 during the COVID-19 pandemic; service levels were restored to pre-COVID frequency on April 25, 2022. Most service will be replaced by buses from July 18 to September 9, 2022, during canopy roof replacement at Hartford Union Station and slope stabilization work in Windsor.

=== Valley Flyer pilot program ===
On June 12, 2018, Massachusetts Governor Charlie Baker announced that two daily round trips would be extended to Greenfield in 2019 as a pilot program. By February 2019, the two-year pilot was expected to begin in June 2019; however, by that May it was delayed to later in the year. On August 30, 2019, the Valley Flyer program began. Two round trips are offered on weekdays and one on weekends with southbound trains in the morning and northbound in the evening which complement Amtrak's existing daily service on the Vermonter. Additionally a reverse round trip operates between Springfield and Greenfield on weekends only.

== Operation ==
The local Hartford Line trains are numbered in the 400 series, usually denoting by the last two digits which Northeast Regional train the Hartford Line train is connecting with. Trains terminating in Springfield carry the Hartford Line name, while trains terminating in Greenfield carry the Valley Flyer designation. Typical consists run in push-pull configuration with a General Electric P42DC pulling an Amfleet I coach and a ex-Metroliner cab car. Normally the ex-Budd Metroliner leads northbound trains, while the GE Genesis usually leads most southbound trains. Crew bases are at Springfield and New Haven, with diesel locomotive servicing taking place at New Haven.

The New Haven–Springfield corridor is served by all Northeast Regional trains in the 140 series (except trains 145 and 149), as well as trains 125, 136, and 157. These trains run from Springfield to Washington, D.C. or Virginia without the need to change trains. The corridor is also served by Amtrak's Vermonter.

== Fares ==
Fares for travel within the corridor are subsidized by the states of Connecticut and Massachusetts, and are coordinated with the CTrail Hartford Line. Amtrak tickets are discounted to commuter rail-level pricing for trips on Amtrak Hartford Line, Valley Flyer, and Northeast Regional services between Springfield, New Haven, and intermediate stations. CTrail tickets and passes are also accepted on these services.

Vermonter trains on the corridor do not accept CTrail tickets, and are subject to standard Amtrak fares and reservations policies. Additionally, CTrail tickets are not accepted on Northeast Regional trains on certain days during the holiday season. Amtrak sells tickets for services on the corridor via its standard sales channels, including staffed ticket windows, QuikTrak ticket machines, online, and by phone.

== Stations ==
| State | Milepost (km) | Location | Station | Connections |
|---|---|---|---|---|
| Massachusetts | 0 mi (0 km) | Springfield | Springfield Union Station | Amtrak: Lake Shore Limited, Northeast Regional, Vermonter, Valley Flyer; CTrail: Hartford Line; PVTA Bus: B4, B6, B7, B12, B17, G1, G2, G3, G5, G73E, P20, P21, P21E, R10, R14, X92, PS; Intercity bus: Greyhound Lines, Peter Pan Bus Lines |
| Connecticut | 14.6 mi (23.5 km) | Windsor Locks | Windsor Locks | Amtrak: Northeast Regional, Vermonter, Valley Flyer; CTrail: Hartford Line; CTtransit Bus: 24, 96, 905 |
| Connecticut | 19.1 mi (30.7 km) | Windsor | Windsor | Amtrak: Northeast Regional, Valley Flyer; CTrail: Hartford Line; CTtransit Bus: 24, 32, 34, 36 |
| Connecticut | 25.3 mi (40.7 km) | Hartford | Hartford Union Station | Amtrak: Northeast Regional, Vermonter, Valley Flyer; CTrail: Hartford Line; CTfastrak: 101 Hartford/New Britain, 102 Hartford/New Britain/Bristol, 128 Hartford/Westfarms-New Britain; CTtransit Bus: 30, 45X, 62, 64, 66, 72, 74, 82, 83, 84, 901, 902, 903, 904, 905, 913, SC, DASH, PPB; Intercity bus: Greyhound Lines, Peter Pan Bus Lines |
| Connecticut | 35.9 mi (57.8 km) | Berlin | Berlin | Amtrak: Northeast Regional, Valley Flyer; CTrail: Hartford Line; CTtransit Bus: 512 Berlin Turnpike |
| Connecticut | 43.3 mi (69.7 km) | Meriden | Meriden Transit Center | Amtrak: Northeast Regional, Vermonter, Valley Flyer; CTrail: Hartford Line; CTtransit Bus: 215, 561, 563, 564, 565, 950 |
| Connecticut | 49.0 mi (78.9 km) | Wallingford | Wallingford | Amtrak: Northeast Regional, Valley Flyer; CTrail: Hartford Line; CTtransit Bus: 215 New Haven/Wallingford/Meriden, 292 North Colony Road |
| Connecticut | 61.4 mi (98.8 km) | New Haven | New Haven State Street | Amtrak: Northeast Regional, Valley Flyer; CTrail: Hartford Line, Shore Line East; Metro-North Railroad: New Haven Line; CTtransit Bus: 204, 206, 212, 223, 274, 278, 950 |
| Connecticut | 62.0 mi (99.8 km) | New Haven | New Haven Union Station | Amtrak: Acela, Northeast Regional, Vermonter, Valley Flyer; CTrail: Hartford Line, Shore Line East; Metro-North Railroad: New Haven Line; CTtransit Bus: 212, 265, 271, 272, 274, 278, 950, USS |
