= Springfield Union Station (Massachusetts) =

Train station in Springfield, Massachusetts, US

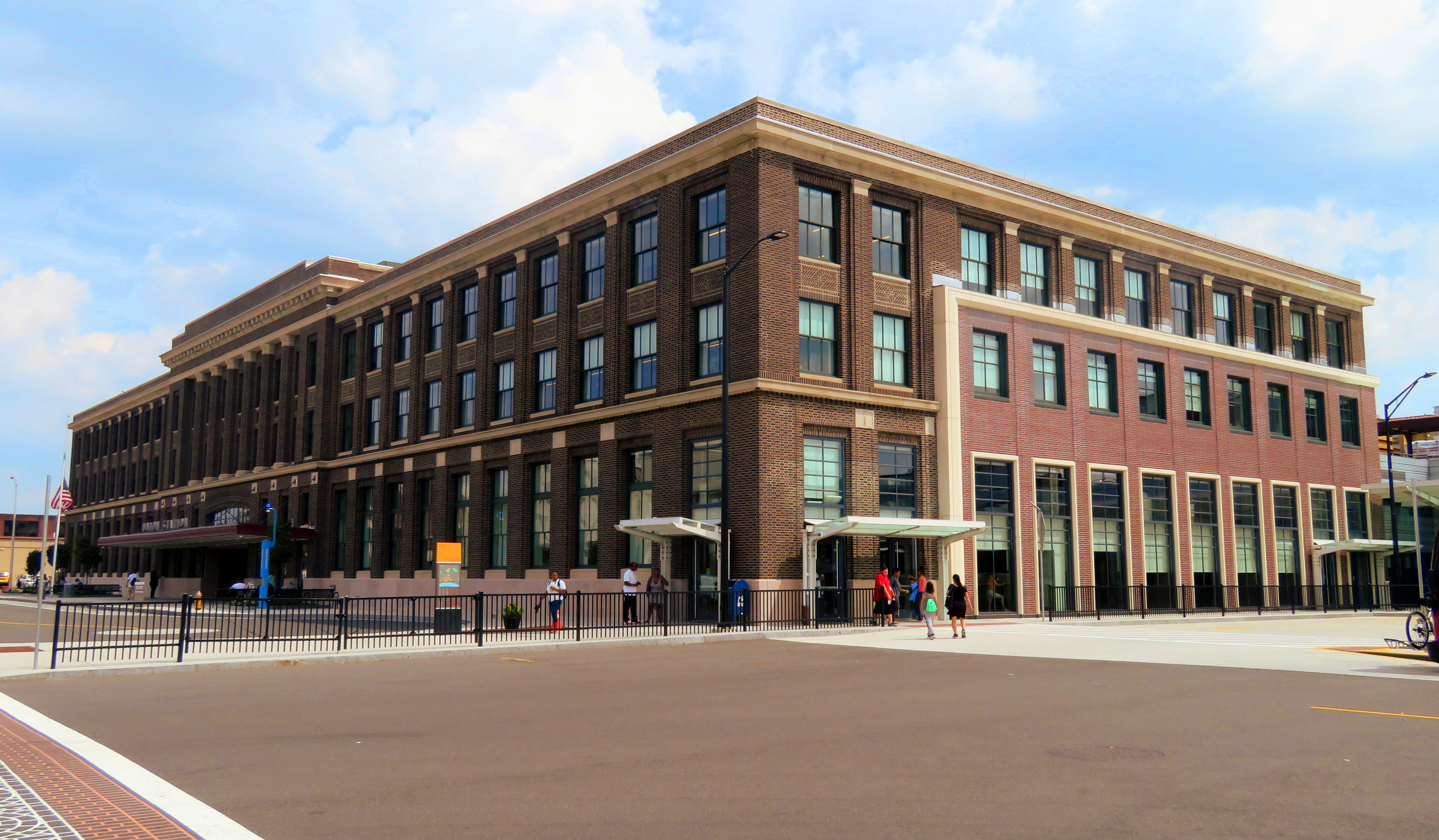
- Springfield Union Station in August 2018

General information
- Location: 55 Frank B. Murray Street; Springfield, Massachusetts; United States
- Coordinates: 42.106047°N 72.592936°W
- Owner: Springfield Redevelopment Authority (main building, bus station, parking garage); Amtrak, CSX (platforms and tracks)
- Lines: New Haven–Springfield Line; Connecticut River Line; Berkshire Subdivision
- Platforms: 1 side platform, 2 island platform
- Tracks: 6
- Bus stands: 26
- Connections: Pioneer Valley Transit Authority: G1, G2, G3, B4, G5, B6, B7, R10, P11, B12, R14, B17, P20, P21, P21E, G73E, X92, PS; Greyhound Lines; Peter Pan Bus Lines

Construction
- Parking: 377 spaces (parking garage)
- Cycle facilities: Bike racks are available; Bike Sharing (ValleyBike Share)
- Accessible: Yes

Other information
- Station code: Amtrak: SPG
- IATA code: ZSF
- Website: springfieldunionstation.com

History
- Opened: 1839
- Rebuilt: 1853, 1891, 1926, 1973, 1994, 2017

Passengers
- FY 2025: 162,614 (Amtrak)
Services
Preceding station	Amtrak	Following station
Windsor Locks toward Norfolk, Newport News or Roanoke	Northeast Regional	Terminus
Windsor Locks toward New Haven	Hartford Line	Terminus
Windsor Locks toward New Haven	Valley Flyer	Holyoke toward Greenfield
Pittsfield toward Chicago	Lake Shore Limited	Worcester toward Boston South
Windsor Locks toward Washington, D.C.	Vermonter	Holyoke toward St. Albans
Preceding station	CT Rail	Following station
Windsor Locks toward New Haven Union Station	Hartford Line	Terminus
Former services
Preceding station	Amtrak	Following station
Hartford toward Washington, D.C.	Montrealer 1972–1987	Northampton toward Montreal
Windsor Locks toward Atlantic City	Atlantic City Express 1991–1995	Terminus
Preceding station	New York Central Railroad	Following station
Pittsfield toward Albany	Boston and Albany Railroad Main Line	North Wilbraham toward Boston
West Springfield toward Albany	Boston and Albany Railroad Main Line	North Wilbraham toward Boston
Location

Springfield Union Station is a train and bus station in the Metro Center area of Springfield, Massachusetts. Constructed in 1926, Springfield Union Station is the fifth-busiest Amtrak station in Massachusetts, and the busiest outside of Greater Boston.

A large-scale $94 million renovation project restored the former station building, and it reopened in late June 2017 as a regional intermodal transit hub. It not only features Amtrak service but also serves as the hub for the Pioneer Valley Transit Authority (PVTA), along with Peter Pan Bus Lines, Greyhound Lines, and the CTrail Hartford Line commuter rail. PVTA and intercity bus services began using the renovated station in 2017, and the Hartford Line opened in June 2018. Amtrak moved from a 1994-built structure to the renovated station in June 2019.

== History ==
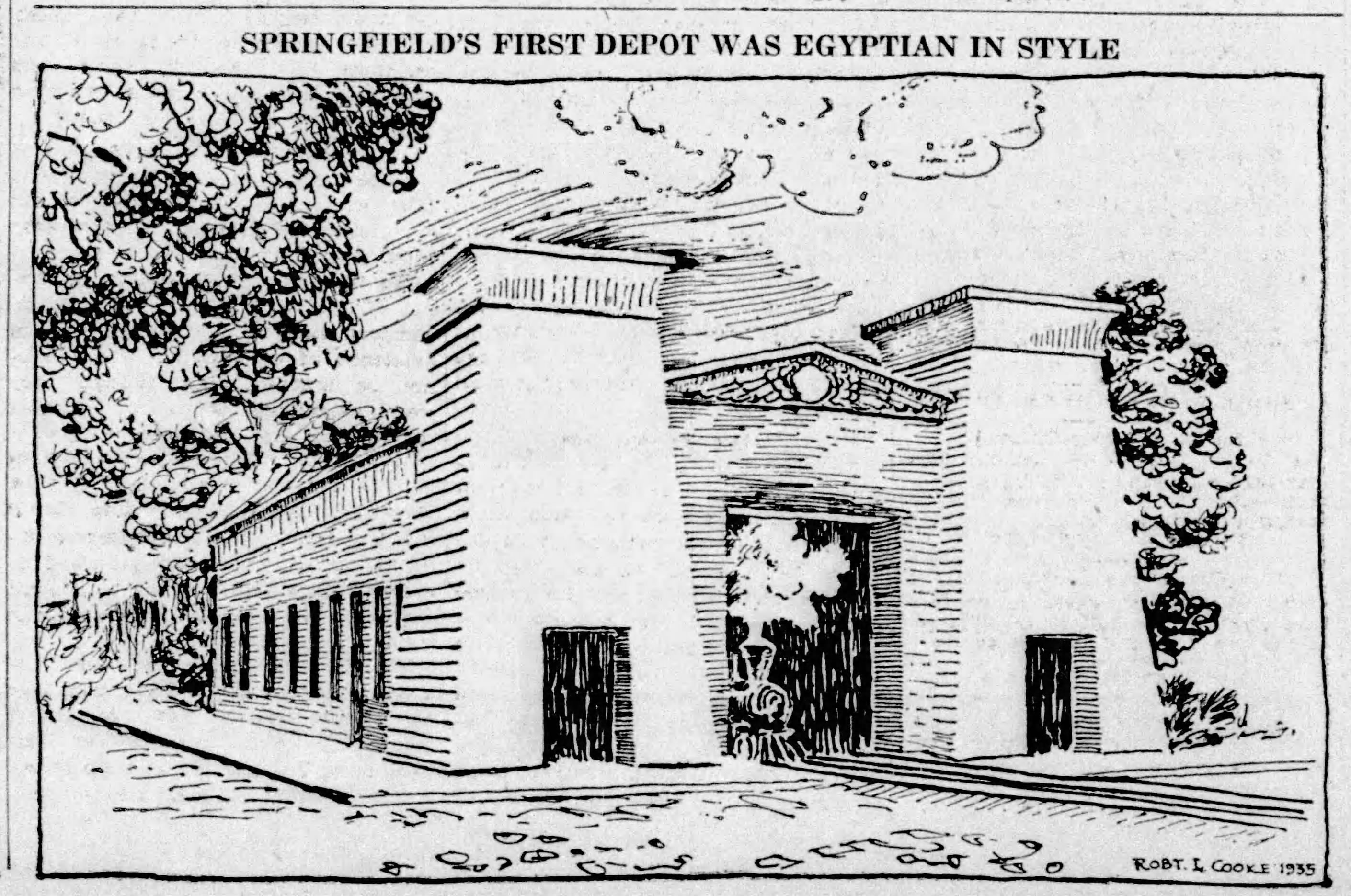
1935 sketch in The Springfield Daily Republican of the 1839-built station; partly based upon an older (but non-contemporary) illustration in Clark W. Bryan's Progressive Springfield

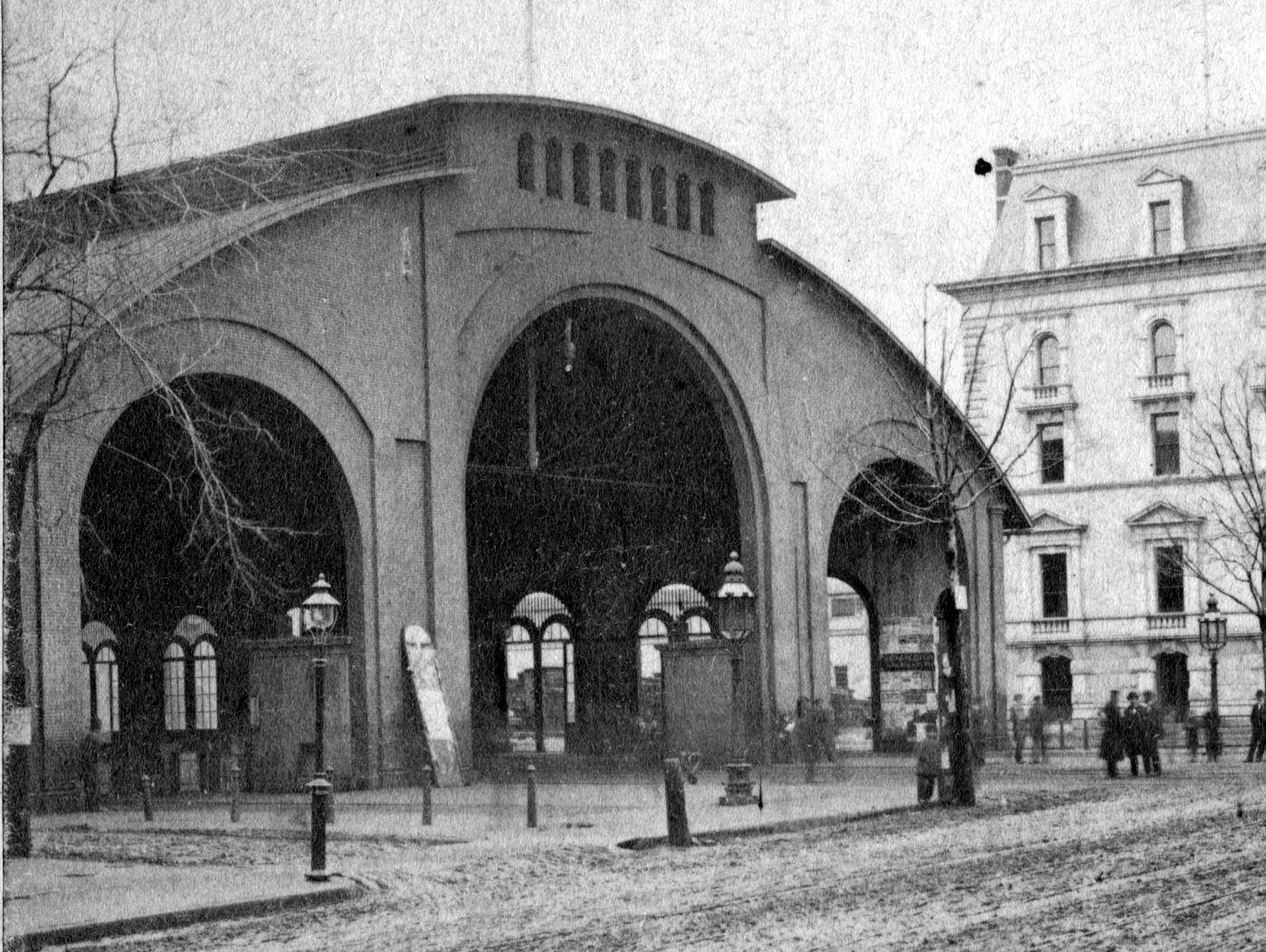
The first so-named Union Station constructed in 1853, ca. 1888 during its dismantlement

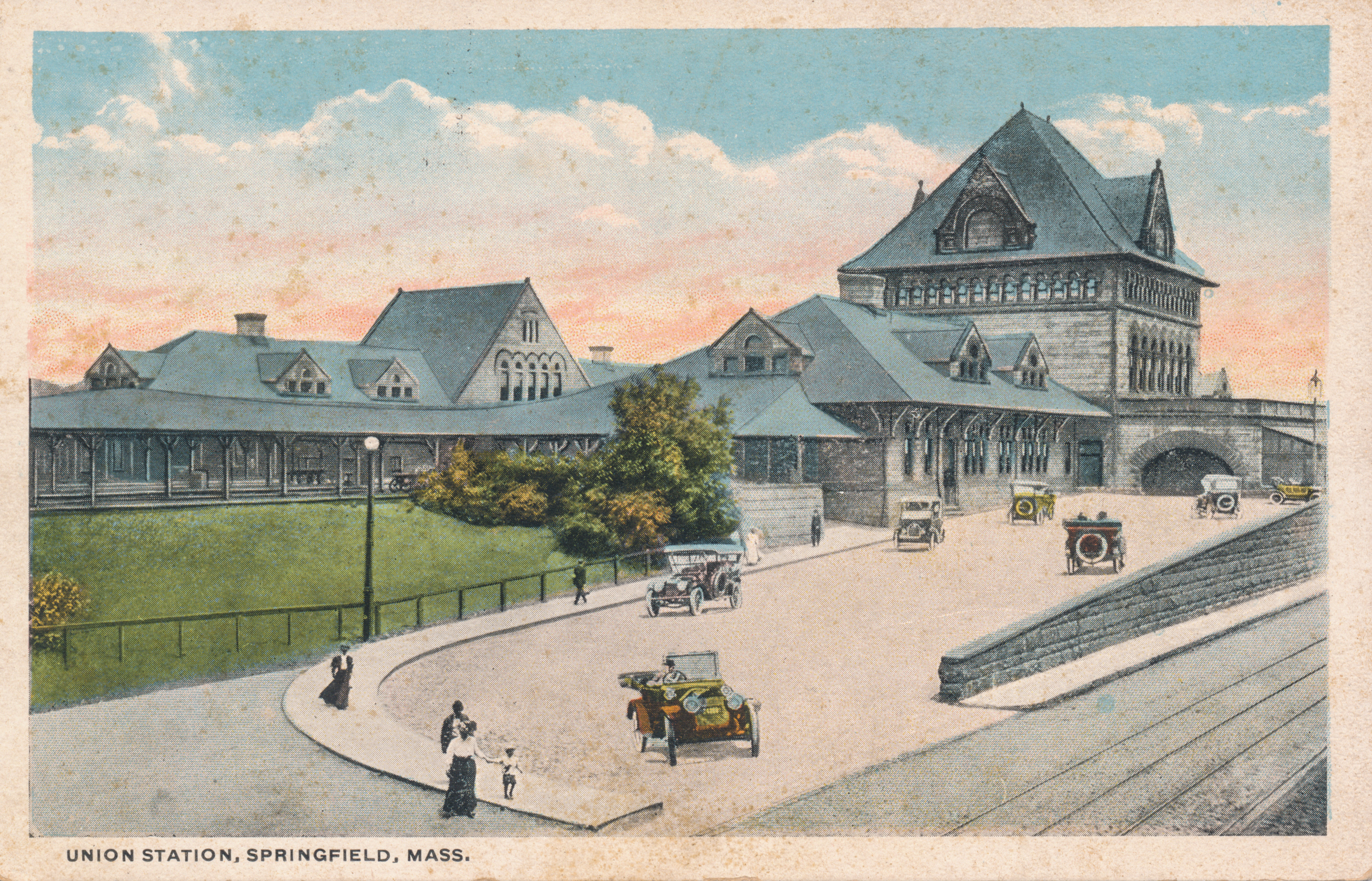
The second Union Station, ca. 1910

In 1838, construction of a Springfield expansion of the Western Railroad was put under contract. The railroad opened for use on October 1, 1839. The station connected Springfield to Worcester and, by the early 1840s, to Albany and Hartford. It was constructed out of wood and was the only building in Springfield's history in the Egyptian Revival style.

On October 3, 1839, an opening celebration for the station took place. It featured a military parade and dinner, with an estimated six to seven hundred people in attendance. Notable speakers at the event included sitting Massachusetts governor Edward Everett (1836–1840) and past governor Levi Lincoln Jr. (1825–1834).

In 1851, the station was destroyed by a fire. A more fire-resistant union station was built in its place in 1853. It was replaced in the 1890s with a Richardsonian Romanesque station designed by Shepley, Rutan and Coolidge. The Boston and Albany Railroad, New York, New Haven and Hartford Railroad, and Boston and Maine Railroad constructed a third union station in 1926 for $5.87 million. The station opened to the public on December 18, 1926.

As early as the 1950s, the New York Central Railroad, which had operated the Boston & Albany since 1900, considered Union Station "a white elephant" and wanted to sell it. The opening of the Massachusetts Turnpike in 1958 was said to have caused a 50% decline in passenger trips to Boston. By 1962, train departures had fallen from a 1920s–30s peak of 97 per day to fewer than 15 per day. The station was sold in 1970 to David Buntzman, a real estate speculator from Larchmont, New York.

Amtrak took over intercity service in 1971. By 1973, there were no longer enough trains calling at Springfield to justify such a large station, and the main station building and baggage building were closed. A new station would have likely been needed in any event. The building had not been well-maintained in several years, and rehabilitating it was deemed too costly. Amtrak opened a makeshift station at street level within the passenger tunnel, with the sole entrance being from Lyman Street. The connection from the tunnel to the old station was sealed. The City of Springfield bought the station in 1989, but planned restoration efforts were hampered by a fire at the nearby Charles Hotel.

In 1994, Amtrak constructed a station building at track level and sealed off the passenger tunnel except for the Lyman Street entrance and the southernmost stairway and elevator shaft to track level. A modern elevator was installed in the remaining open shaft to connect from street level to the new station building above.

=== Renovation ===
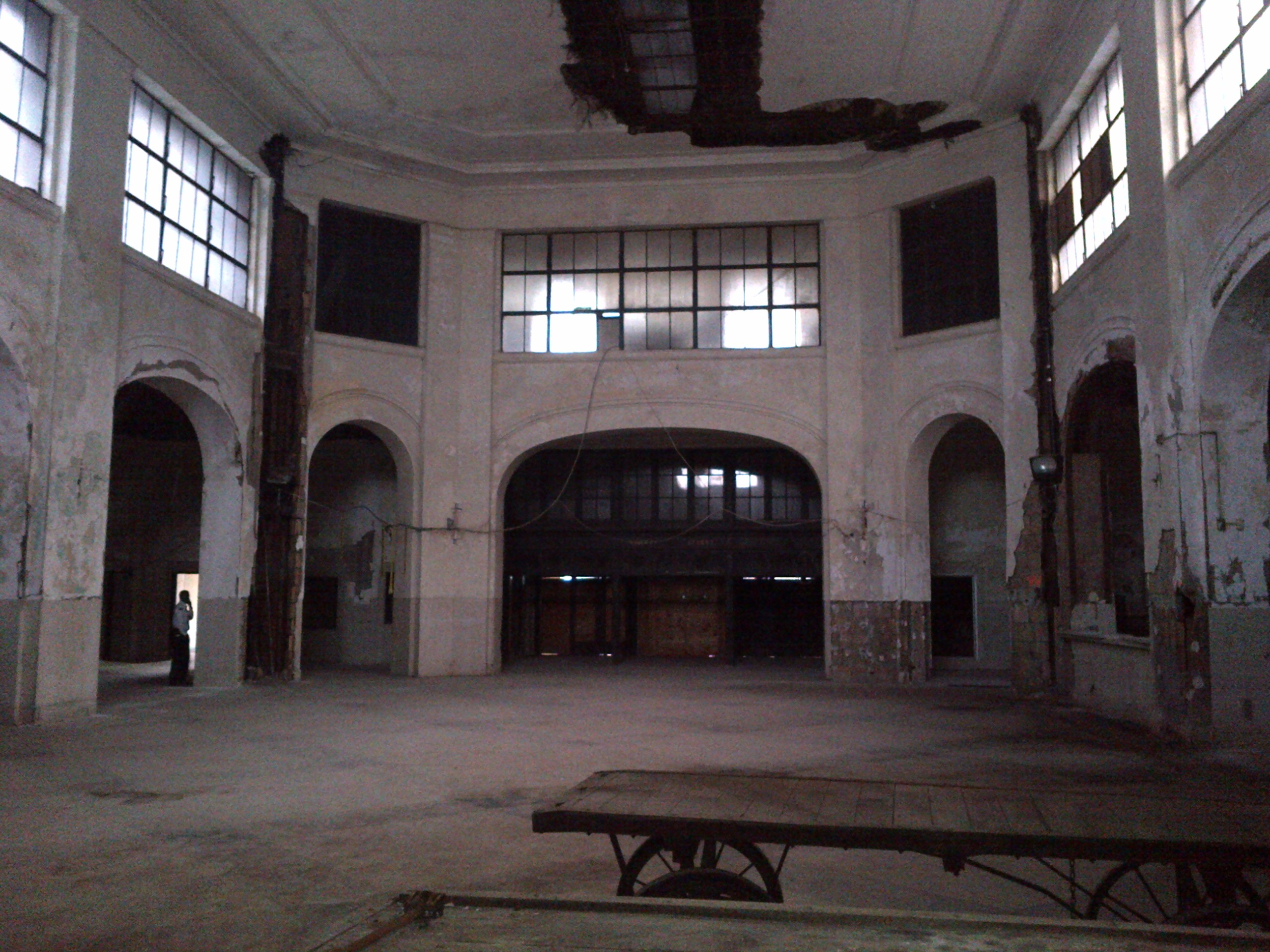
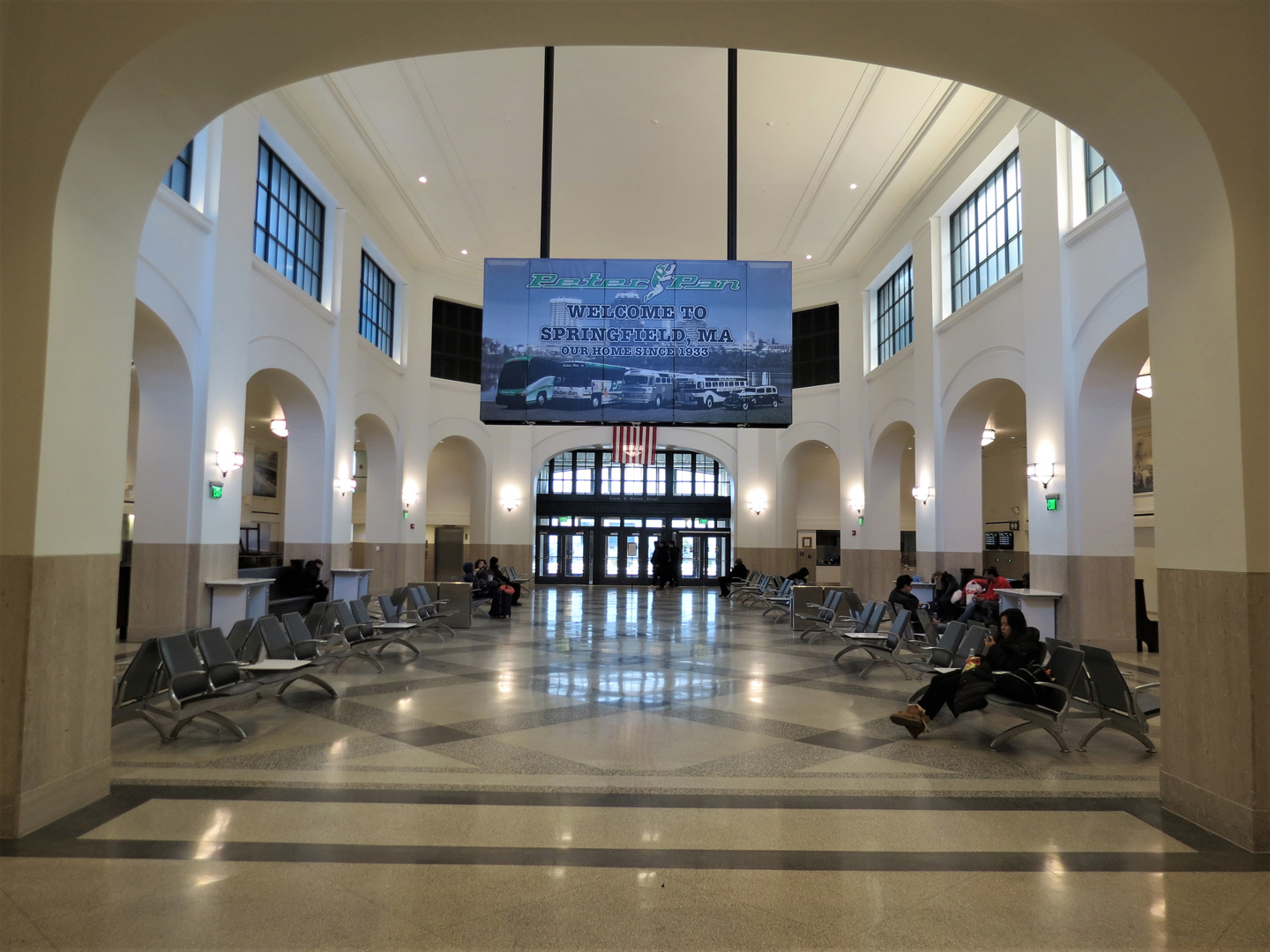
The main concourse as it appeared prior to restoration in 2012, and in service in 2019

In October 2008, the Pioneer Valley Transit Authority and the Springfield Redevelopment Authority released a redevelopment plan for Union Station. The plan, estimated to cost $65.2 million, called for restoring the 1926 Union Station Terminal building for reuse as an intermodal rail and bus station and fully building out the first floor and main concourse with rentable commercial space and ticketing and waiting areas for both rail and bus. The baggage/railway express building was to be demolished and baggage tunnel sealed. A parking garage and bus bays for both inter-city and regional bus services (which would replace the Peter L. Picknelly Transportation Center a block away) would go on the footprint of the former baggage building. Additionally the pedestrian tunnel to Lyman Street would be restored, and the platforms raised for handicapped accessibility. The final plan announced in December 2014, at a cost $75.7 million, added restoration and building out the upper floors of the 1926 station building to usable vacant "shell space," which would include only infrastructure and utility work on those floors, with final finishing work to be done by the eventual tenants based on their needs. This space is aimed for use by office or other commercial tenants. By the time the station opened, the full cost had risen to $94 million.

Demolition of the baggage/railway express building began on December 1, 2014, and was completed in early 2015. The only remnant of the baggage facility is a tunnel under the rail viaduct that was used for freight and baggage transport between the warehouse and the trains above. The only remaining entrance to this tunnel (off limits to the public) is a set of doors along the retaining wall in the bus loading area at the location of where the tunnel formerly connected to the warehouse. By February 2016 the parking garage had been assembled and restoration work on the station terminal building had begun, with new windows and roofing installed. The restoration was nearly complete in March 2017 when officials took journalists on a tour and the grand opening occurred on June 24, 2017.

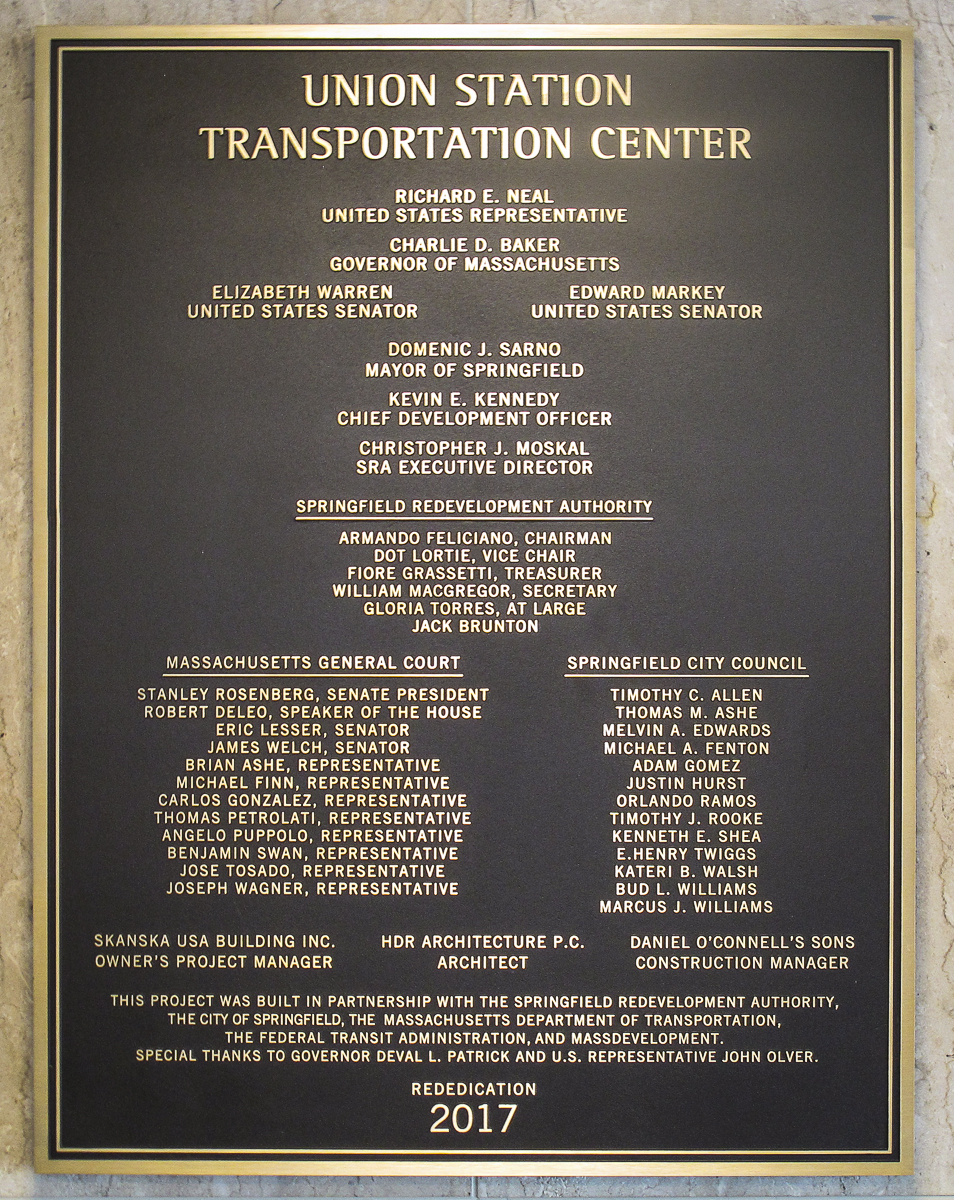
Bronze re-dedication plaque at the Union Station Transportation Center in Springfield, Massachusetts

The PVTA was the first transportation operator to use the renovated station; it began operations there on June 24, 2017, leasing 18 bus berths. Peter Pan and Greyhound buses began operating out of Union Station on September 6, 2017. The companies ended a two-decade revenue sharing agreement and began operating competing services three weeks later. The CTrail Hartford Line commuter rail service began operating out of the renovated terminal in June 2018.

Amtrak relocated ticketing and the passenger waiting area to the main concourse of Union Station in June 2019 and returned intercity rail to the main station building for the first time in 45 years.

The new platform designated Platform C was installed with direct stairwell and elevator access to the passenger tunnel below. The design was finalized in March 2018. The platform design process had been delayed due to insufficient space between the stairwell head house and the platform edge. The Federal Railroad Administration denied a waiver from the clearance requirement, which prevented the design from being finished before the revitalization of the historic station building itself. The project was awarded to a construction contractor in May 2018 and construction began in August 2018. The 328-foot (100 m)-long high-level Platform C opened on January 23, 2020, with a final cost of $10 million. Platform C retains some historic elements of the former low-level platform it replaced, including the existing overhead canopy steel structure.

== Services ==
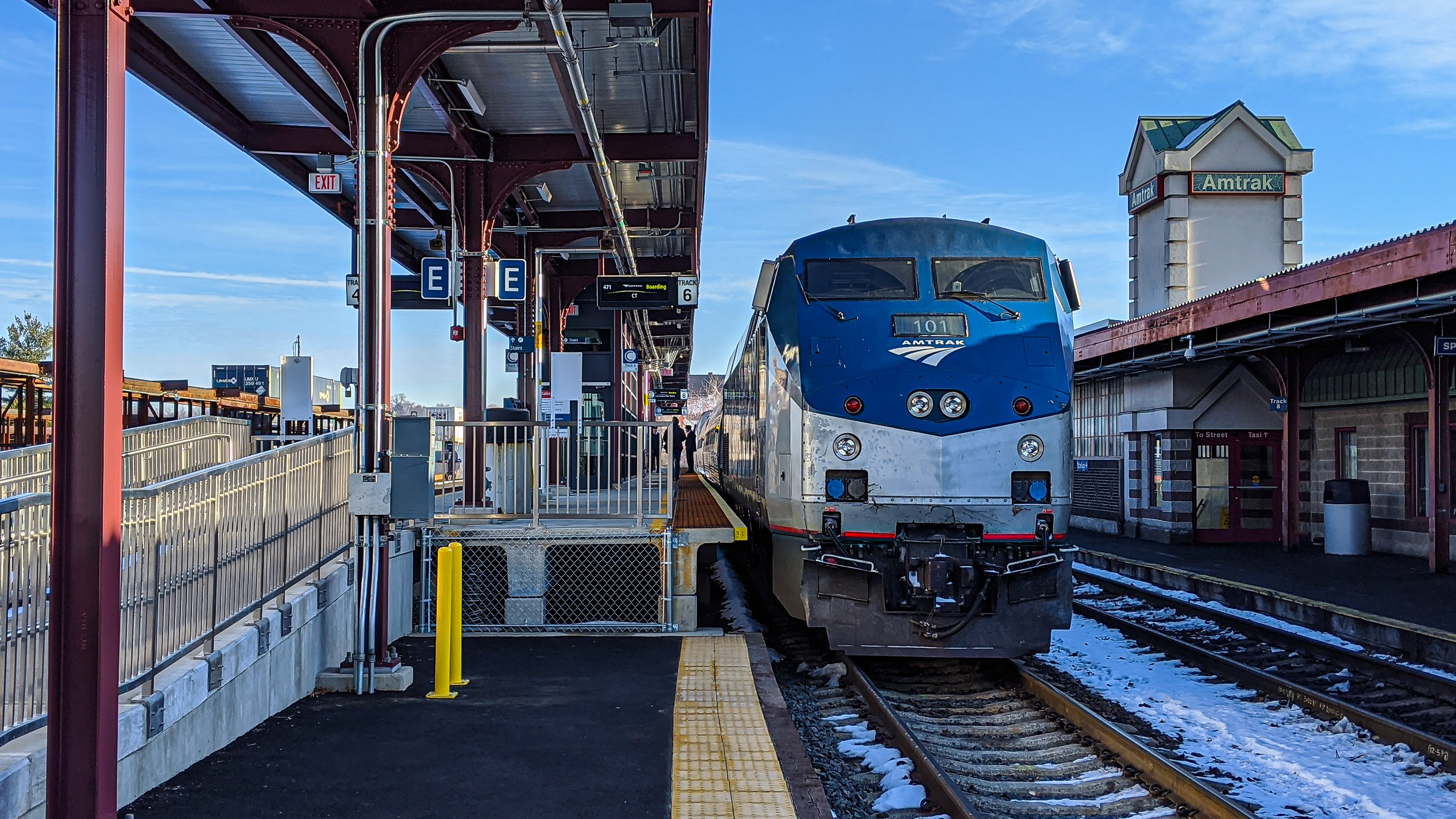
Valley Flyer train 471 at Springfield Union Station

=== Amtrak ===
The primary passenger rail service at Springfield Union Station are the Hartford Line trains connecting Springfield to the Amtrak's Northeast Corridor trains in New Haven. An additional 1–2 daily Northeast Regional round trips originate or terminate at Springfield.

The station is also served by the Vermonter and Lake Shore Limited trains. The Vermonter currently uses the north-south Connecticut River Line to Connecticut and Vermont, while the Lake Shore Limited makes use of the east–west Boston Line platforms as it continues to and from Albany, New York.

In the past a single Northeast Regional round trip (usually trains 142 and 145) would travel between New Haven and Boston via the so-called "Inland Route" via Springfield and the Boston Line, as opposed to the faster, electrified Northeast Corridor. In 2003, a problem pulled the Acela Express trainsets out of service and in an effort to find substitute rolling stock, Amtrak first curtailed the inland round trip to a three-car shuttle between Boston and New Haven before canceling it completely. Today, all normally-scheduled Regional trains using the Inland Route use only the portion between Springfield and New Haven; in the event of a service disruption on the Northeast Corridor, trains may be scheduled to run via the complete Inland Route. One such occasion was the replacement of the Thames River Bridge movable span in June 2008, when Amtrak scheduled three round trips per day over the Inland Route to substitute for the complete suspension of regular Northeast Corridor service.

In 1991, Amtrak extended one daily Atlantic City Express round trip to Springfield, which served other destinations such as Washington, D.C. and Harrisburg. The service was discontinued in 1995 due to low ridership.

=== Hartford Line ===
Springfield's renovated Union Station is the northern terminus for the CTrail Hartford Line, a commuter rail service which began operating out of Union Station on June 16, 2018. On July 24, 2017 the Connecticut Department of Transportation announced that a joint partnership between TransitAmerica Services and Alternate Concepts Inc. was chosen as the operator for the new service. This partnership operates similar commuter services in other markets. Amtrak continues its present intercity service on the line and will continue to own and maintain the infrastructure on the rail line between New Haven and Springfield. The expanded service to Springfield Union Station from New Haven includes a total of seven additional roundtrips, four of which are commuter trains operated by the new CTrail operator, and the other three of which are additional Amtrak Shuttles which brings the service to eight Amtrak round trips and four CTrail round trips. In September 2019, Amtrak ceased using the Shuttle brand name for the 400 series trains and adopted CTDOT's Hartford Line designation. All Amtrak and CTrail trains that terminate and originate at Springfield (or Hartford) now use the Hartford Line designation. On August 30, 2019, Amtrak extended two daily Hartford Line round trips (branded as the Valley Flyer) to Greenfield as a pilot program.

=== Bus operations ===
Union Station serves as the region's bus hub. The Pioneer Valley Transit Authority, which operates local buses serving Springfield and surrounding towns and cities, occupies 18 bus berths at the station. Springfield-based Peter Pan Bus Lines uses seven bus berths for intercity buses, and Greyhound Lines uses the remaining two for its intercity service.

=== Service expansion plans ===
As of 2026, the Massachusetts Department of Transportation plans to increase intercity service with Springfield as a hub station. This would include Boston–Springfield–New Haven service in the early 2030s, followed by new Boston–Springfield–Albany service. The state has received three federal grants for improvements to the station and surrounding trackage to support this planned service. In June 2022, the state received $1.75 million for preliminary engineering and environmental studies for the project. In October 2024, the state was awarded $36.8 million to complete design work. In October 2026, the state was awarded a $130 million federal grant for construction of the project. The work will include modifications to the four platforms (including complete reconstruction of the northern platform), a new northern track, additional crossovers, and a layover yard east of the station.

== Station layout ==
The Union Station building, bus bays, and parking garage are located on the north side of the rail viaduct adjacent to Frank B. Murray Street. The stairwells and elevators to the boarding platforms is located on the south side of the viaduct next to Lyman Street. A tunnel leads under the viaduct, allowing Union Station to be accessed from Lyman Street. The main hall in Union Station includes a waiting area for rail passengers, restaurants, retail spaces, and ticket windows for rail and intercity bus services; a PVTA local bus waiting area and an intercity bus waiting area are located in an adjacent room. Commercial space is located on the second and third floors.

The rail viaduct holds six tracks, which are numbered 1, 2, 2a, 4, 6, and 8 from north to south. Tracks 1 and 2 are primarily used by CSX Transportation for freight service on their Berkshire Subdivision and are served by platforms A and B; track 2 is also used for boarding and disembarking of the daily Lake Shore Limited train. Track 2a, which connects with both the New Haven–Springfield Line and the CSX tracks, is owned by Amtrak is used mainly for storing train equipment and is not normally used for boarding. Tracks 4 through 8 (serving platforms C and D) are currently used for most Amtrak service; they connect directly to the New Haven–Springfield Line west of the station, but only connect to the CSX tracks east of the station. (The Lake Shore Limited uses the CSX tracks for this reason.) West of the station, the New Haven–Springfield Line curves to the south while the Berkshire Subdivision continues on to cross the Connecticut River on a twin truss bridge. The Connecticut River Line connects to both lines west of the station, although it requires a backup move to reach tracks 4 though 8.

The four current platforms were once all island platforms, with stairways to the under-track tunnel and cargo elevators to a separate tunnel serving the baggage/railway express building. Platform C, between tracks 4 and 6, was demolished and rebuilt as a high-level boarding platform. Platform C is served by its own elevator and stairwell from the passenger tunnel. Platform D, which serves track 8 and is adjacent to the former 1994 station building, is accessed from the older elevator and stairwell closest to the Lyman Street entrance. Platform B/track 2 is accessed via a paved walkway from the west end of platform D that crosses tracks 2A, 4, 6, and 8.

The station offers a Commuter Variety newsstand that sells quick necessities, Dunkin' Donuts and Subway restaurants. On June 6, 2017, Dietz & Company Architects, the largest architecture firm in the region, announced they would be occupying approximately 8,200 square feet (760 m^{2}) on the second floor. On November 20, 2017, Peter Pan Bus Lines announced the signing of a lease for 21,000 square feet (2,000 m^{2}) of office space at Union Station for the company's corporate headquarters. The company occupies the entire third floor of the building.
