= Union Station (Palmer, Massachusetts) =

Former train station in Palmer, Massachusetts

Palmer
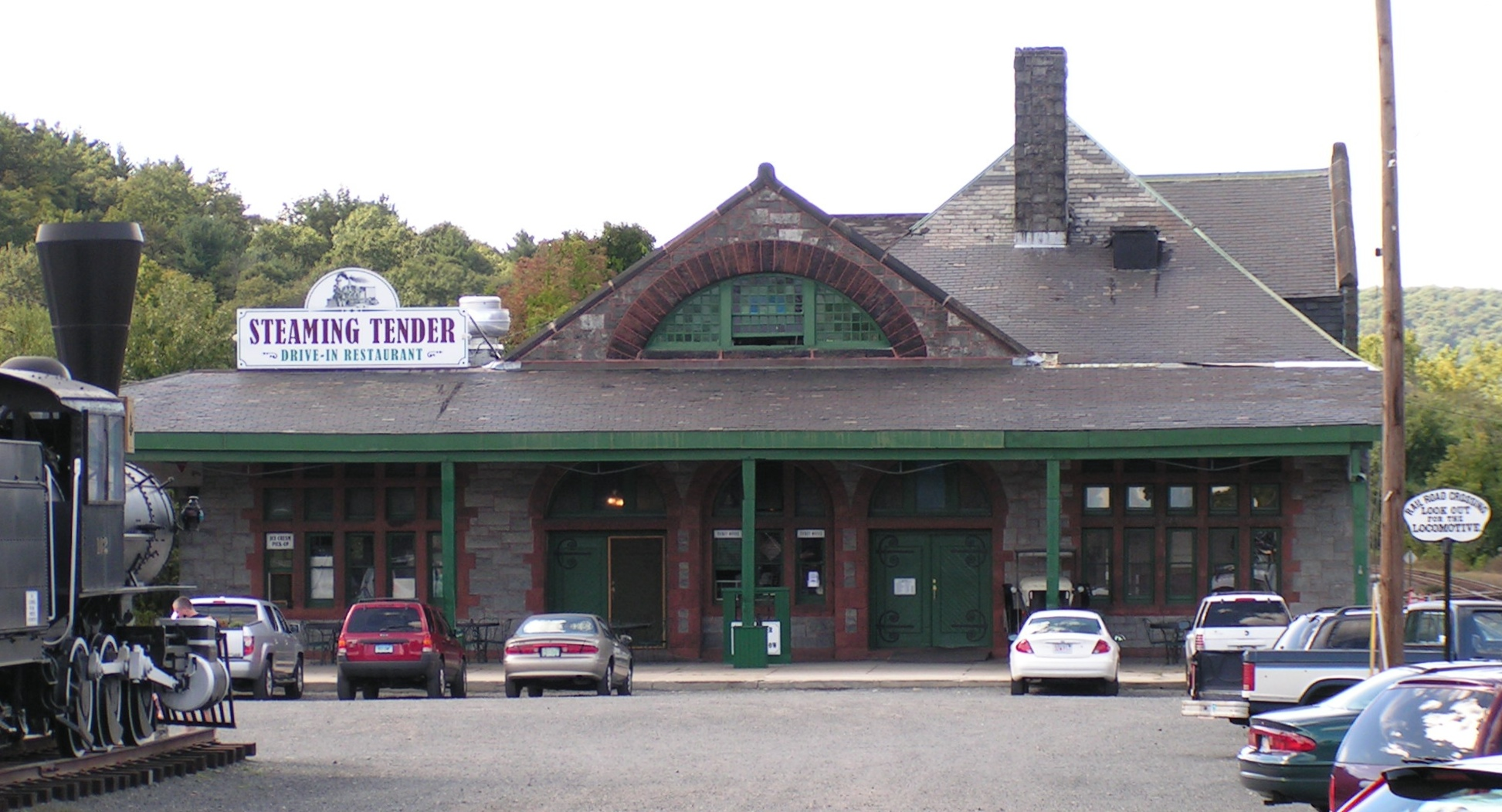

General information
- Other names: Union Station
- Location: 28 Depot Street, Palmer, Massachusetts
- Coordinates: 42°9′20″N 72°19′47″W

Construction
- Architect: Henry Hobson Richardson; W.N. Flynt & Company
- Architectural style: Romanesque

History
- Opened: June 1884

Former services
Preceding station	New York Central Railroad	Following station
North Wilbraham toward Albany	Boston and Albany Railroad Main Line	Worcester toward Boston
North Wilbraham toward Albany	Boston and Albany Railroad Main Line	West Brimfield toward Boston
Preceding station	Central Vermont Railway	Following station
Monson toward New London	Main Line	Three Rivers toward St. Johns
- Union Station
- U.S. National Register of Historic Places
- Location within Massachusetts Location within the United States
- NRHP reference No.: 88000715
- Added to NRHP: June 9, 1988
Location

Union Station is a historic former railroad station located in downtown Palmer, Massachusetts. The building, which was designed by American architect H. H. Richardson, opened in June 1884 to consolidate two separate stations nearby. The grounds of the station were originally designed by Frederick Law Olmsted.

It is located at the junction of the Boston and Albany Railroad (later part of the New York Central Railroad, and now the CSX Boston Subdivision), the New London Northern Railroad (later the Central Vermont Railway, now the New England Central Railroad), and the Ware River Railroad (later under the New York Central, and now operated by the Massachusetts Central Railroad).

== History ==
=== Three railroads ===
The Western Railroad opened from Worcester to Springfield, Massachusetts in 1839, and on to Albany, New York in 1841. In 1867, it joined with the Boston and Worcester Railroad to form the Boston and Albany Railroad. The B&A had a station, similar in design to the extant station at West Brookfield, located on the north side of its tracks near the modern station site.

The New London, Willimantic, and Palmer Railroad opened to Palmer in September 1850. It was extended to Amherst in May 1853 by the NLW&P-leased Amherst and Belchertown Railroad. After several reorganizations, they were combined as the New London Northern Railroad in 1864, which itself was leased by the Vermont Central Railroad in 1871 then the Central Vermont Railway in 1873. The NLN station was located on the southwestern side of its tracks, opposite the modern station location.

The Ware River Railroad opened from Palmer to Gilbertville in 1870; it was operated by the New London Northern (with which it shared a right of way north of Palmer) in 1871 and the Vermont Central Railroad until April 1873 when it was bought by the B&A. The line was completed to Winchendon that November.

The three lines continue to see freight service. The Central Vermont was sold to RailTex in 1995 and operated as the New England Central Railroad. RailTex was merged into RailAmerica in 2000, which in turn was acquired by the Genesee & Wyoming company in 2012. The B&A is now the CSX Boston Subdivision, while parts of the Ware River railroad are operated by the Massachusetts Central Railroad.

=== Union Station ===
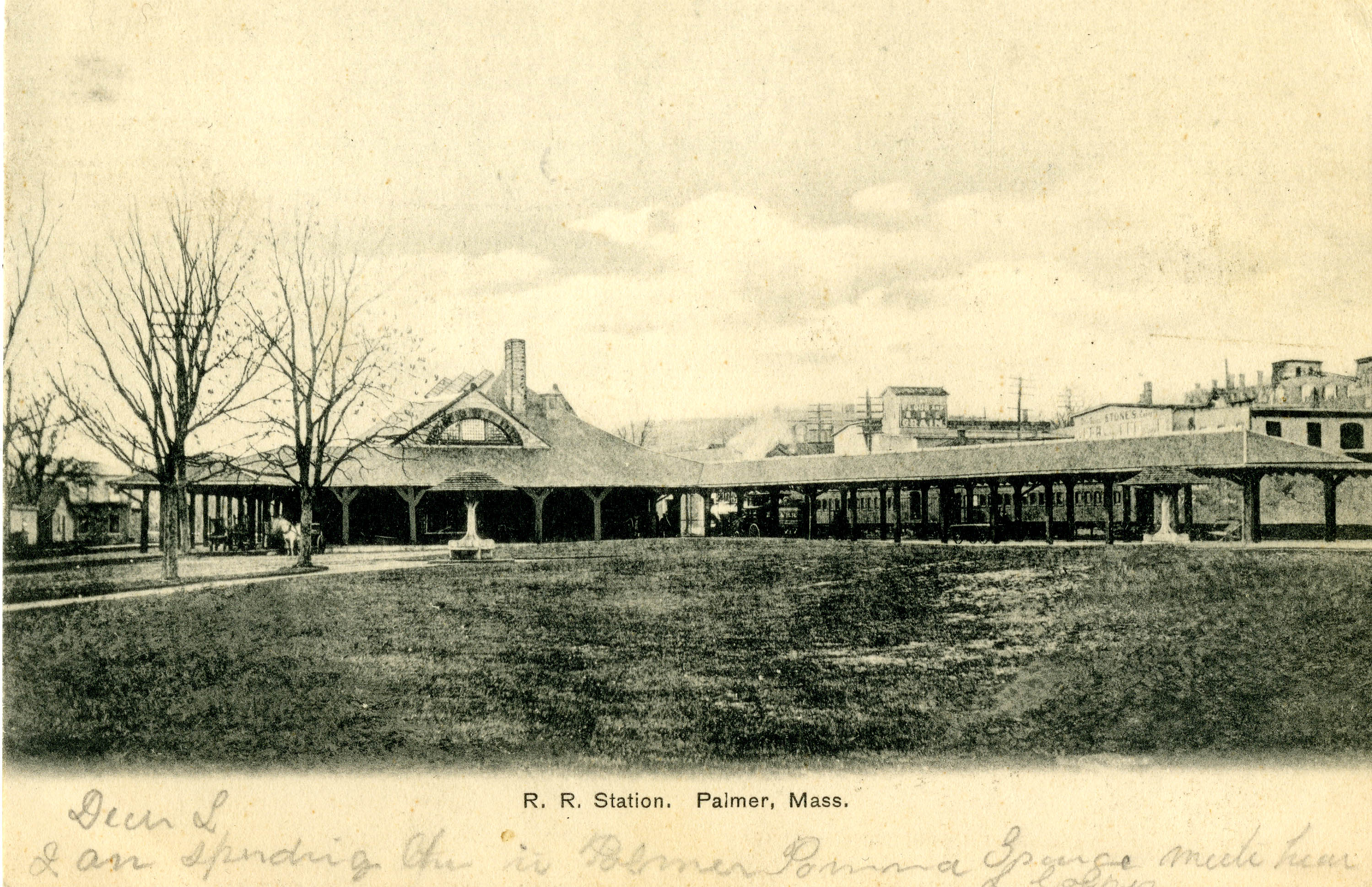
An early postcard of Union Station

In August 1881, the B&A and the NLN hired architect H. H. Richardson to design a union station for both railroads to use. The design was complicated by the narrow angle at which the railroads intersected. W.N. Flynt & Company started work in May 1883 and the station opened in June 1884. It was built of granite from Flynt's quarry (which had its own branch off the NLN in Monson) and trimmed with brownstone from Longmeadow. The station, including a small baggage room which is no longer extant, cost $53,616. Its grounds were designed by Frederick Law Olmsted; little of this landscaping remains.

The Central Vermont (CV) became part of the Grand Trunk Railway in 1899, which in turn was nationalized by the Canadian government in 1922. Passenger service on the CV line ended on September 27, 1947. A mixed train was operated on the Ware River Branch until 1948.

The B&A was acquired by the New York Central Railroad in 1900. Local service was operated until April 24, 1960, after which only Palmer, Springfield, Pittsfield, and Albany remained stops west of Worcester. A single round trip continued to serve Palmer under the NYC and Penn Central until April 30, 1971; Amtrak declined to continue the route when it took over operations the next day. Amtrak's Bay State, Montrealer, Vermonter, and Lake Shore Limited service that have passed the station since then but have not stopped in Palmer.

The station building housed a flea market for many years, and a section of canopy was removed in the 1980s. It was bought by new private owners in 1987, and added to the National Register of Historic Places in 1988. The freight house was torn down by Conrail in 1989. The Steaming Tender Restaurant, which caters to railfans observing busy rail traffic, opened in 2004.

== Proposed restoration of passenger service ==
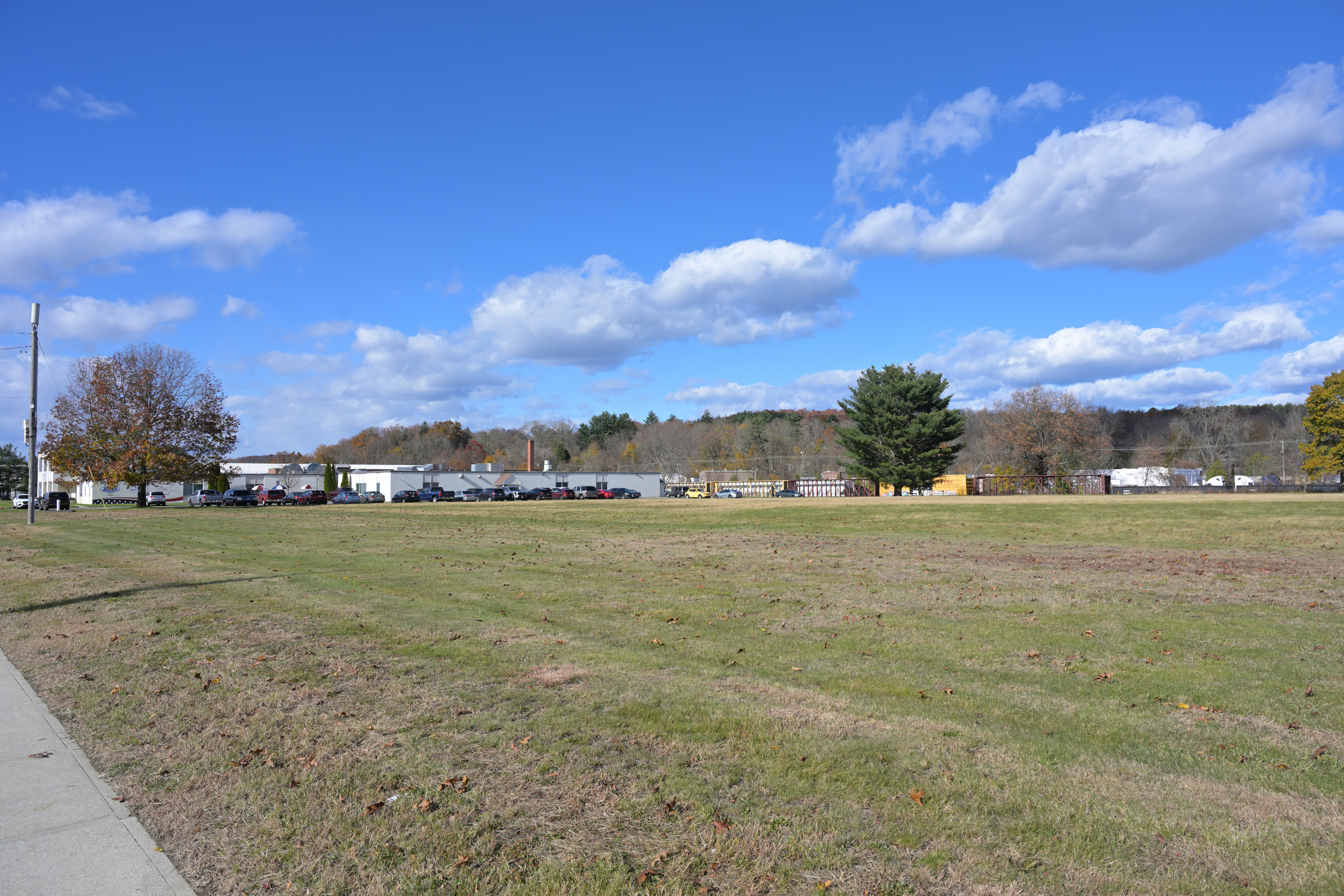
The proposed site for a new Palmer station on South Main Street

Restored passenger rail service to Palmer has been proposed, including East-West Rail on the CSX line and the Central Corridor Rail Line proposal on the NECR.

Early proposals for East-West Rail indicate a new passenger station in Palmer. However, MassDOT ruled out using the existing Union Station site in December 2024 due to a lack of sufficient space to build a station siding and platform without affecting the historic station building. A site on South Main Street on the south side of Palmer Yard, about 0.5 miles (0.80 km) east of downtown Palmer, was deemed the preferred site for the new station, and MassDOT commenced conceptual design work for that site. A group of Palmer residents, including one of the private owners of the historic station building, sued MassDOT in October 2025 over the station site selection, arguing that the existing Union Station site in downtown Palmer would provide more economic benefits for Palmer.
