= East-West Passenger Rail =

Massachusetts east-to-west rail project

East-West Rail
- Amtrak Hartford Line at Springfield Union Station. East-West Rail plans to expand services between Springfield and Boston.

Overview
- Service type: Intercity rail
- Status: Planned
- Locale: Massachusetts, Connecticut, New York
- Predecessor: New England States, Bay State
- Current operator: Amtrak (Planned)
- Former operators: Amtrak, Penn Central, Boston and Albany Railroad
- Ridership: 69,600 (Phase 1 annual estimate)

Route
- Termini: South Station; New Haven (Inland Route), Albany (Full Build)
- Stops: 8 (Phase 2)
- Distance travelled: 171 miles (275 km) (Phase 2)
- Average journey time: 3.09 hours (Phase 2 proposed time)
- Lines used: Boston and Albany Mainline, Framingham/Worcester Line, Amtrak Hartford Line

Technical
- Rolling stock: Amtrak Airo (Planned)
- Track gauge: 4 ft 8 1/2 in (1,435 mm) standard gauge
- Operating speed: 80 miles per hour (130 km/h) (max speed)
- Track owners: Massachusetts Bay Transit Authority, MassDOT, CSX, CTDOT

East-West Rail (also referred to as West-East Rail) is a multiphase project to improve and expand Amtrak intercity passenger rail services between Boston and Western Massachusetts. The project aims to increase services along between Boston and Springfield, with long term plans to extend as far as Pittsfield and Albany, New York. East-West Rail is a component of Massachusetts Department of Transportation's (MassDOT's) comprehensive Compass Rail initiative to coordinate passenger rail improvements throughout Western and Central Massachusetts.

The East-West Rail project was conceived following coordinated advocacy from multiple constituencies in Western Massachusetts including elected officials, transit advocates, and citizens; MassDOT moved forward with an East-West Rail study in 2018. Boston-area political leaders cited expanded Amtrak service as a solution to workforce and housing issues, while Western Massachusetts officials viewed it as a link to Boston's economy.

East-West Rail will use the former Boston and Albany Railroad corridor, which is currently owned by the Massachusetts Bay Transit Authority (MBTA) and CSX Transportation. Current passenger rail services along the corridor are the MBTA Framingham/Worcester Line, which operates as part of the MBTA Commuter Rail network between Boston South Station and Worcester, and Amtrak's Lake Shore Limited, a long-distance service that runs between Boston and Chicago via Albany–Rensselaer station once a day in each direction.

As proposed, East-West Rail will be built in two phases. Phase 1 "Inland Route" service will add two daily trains between New Haven, Connecticut (utilizing Amtrak's Hartford Line), and Boston via Springfield Union Station, in addition to a new infill station in Palmer, Massachusetts, by 2030. Phase 2 "Full Build" service will establish two new daily Boston-Albany trains via Springfield and Pittsfield by 2045. As of 2026, East-West Rail is in the initial planning and development stage, with construction on the Phase 1 Inland Route planned by Spring 2027. East-West Rail service will utilize Airo intercity trainsets.

== History ==
=== Previous services ===
1837 Western Railroad map

The Boston and Worcester Railroad was chartered June 23, 1831, and construction began in August 1832. The line opened in sections: to West Newton on April 16, 1834; to Wellesley on July 3; to Ashland on September 20; to Westborough in November 1834; and the full length to Worcester on July 4, 1835. The Western Railroad was chartered February 15, 1833, and incorporated March 15, 1833, to connect the B&W to the Hudson and Berkshire Railroad at the New York state line. Construction began in 1837, and the Eastern Division to the Connecticut River in Springfield opened on October 1, 1839. The Western Division, through the Berkshire Hills, opened in sections from both ends from the state line to Pittsfield May 4, 1841, West Springfield to Chester May 24, 1841, Springfield to West Springfield (across the Connecticut River) July 4, 1841, Pittsfield to "Summit" August 9, 1841, and Chester to Summit September 13, 1841.

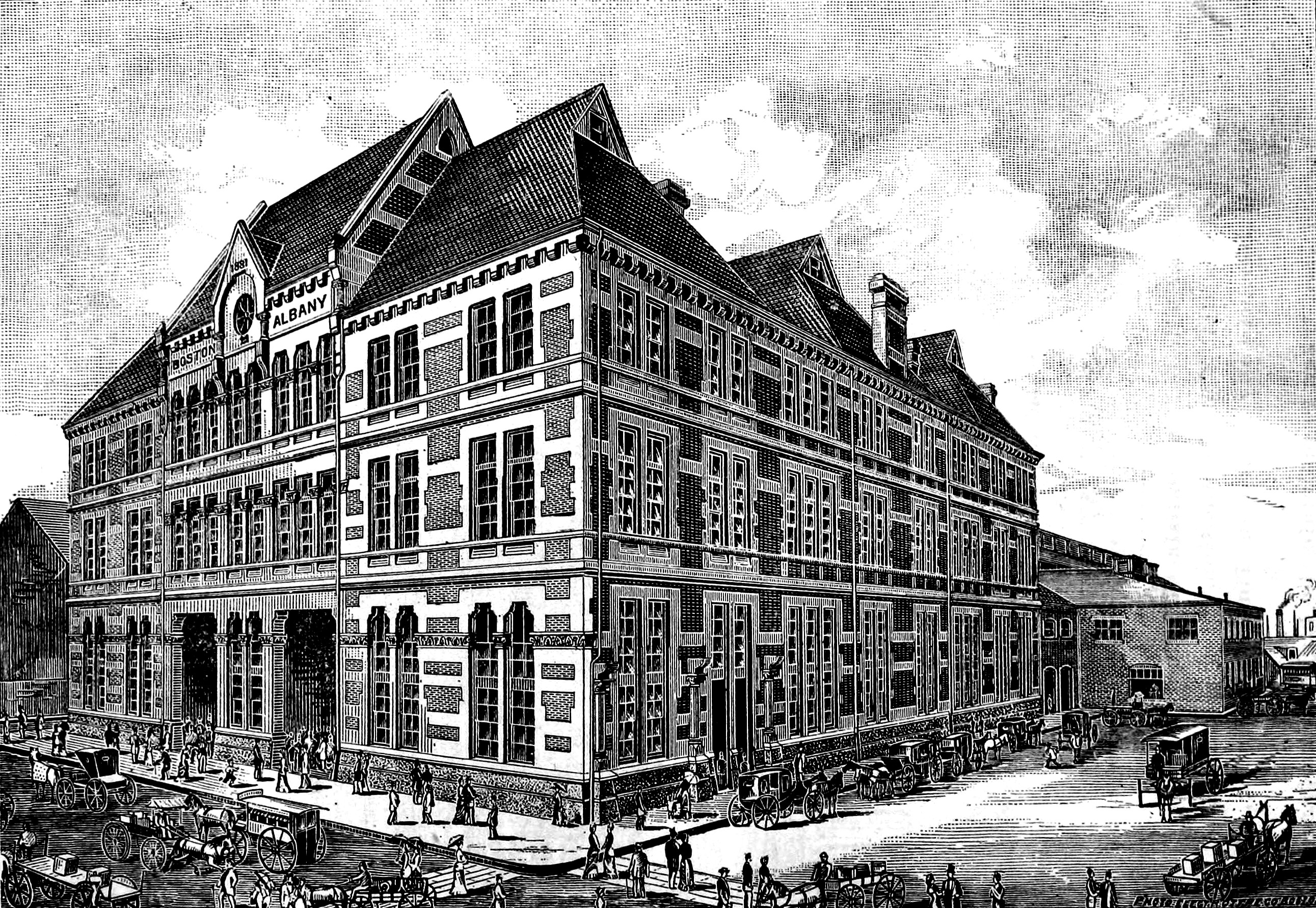
1881 B&A depot in Boston, Massachusetts

In 1870, the east–west line operators were consolidated into the Boston and Albany Railroad (B&A). The New York Central and Hudson River Railroad leased the B&A for 99 years from July 1, 1900. This lease passed to the New York Central Railroad (NYC) in 1914; throughout this, the B&A kept its own branding in the public eye. At its peak in 1912, the B&A operated 12 Boston-Albany round trips, one Boston-Pittsfield round trip, and as many as 10 Pittsfield-North Adams round trips. The NYC merged into Penn Central on February 1, 1968. By the early part of the 20th century, commuter rail service was provided east of Worcester, with intercity rail continuing on west. During the 1940s period of peak passenger volume, the New Haven Railroad (with the cooperation of the New York Central) ran several Boston-New York City trains along the route to Worcester and Springfield and then south. The service included an overnight train with sleeping car service. The last passenger service to run on the line before the creation of Amtrak was an unnamed Chicago-bound successor to the New York Central's New England States on April 30, 1971.

=== Decline ===
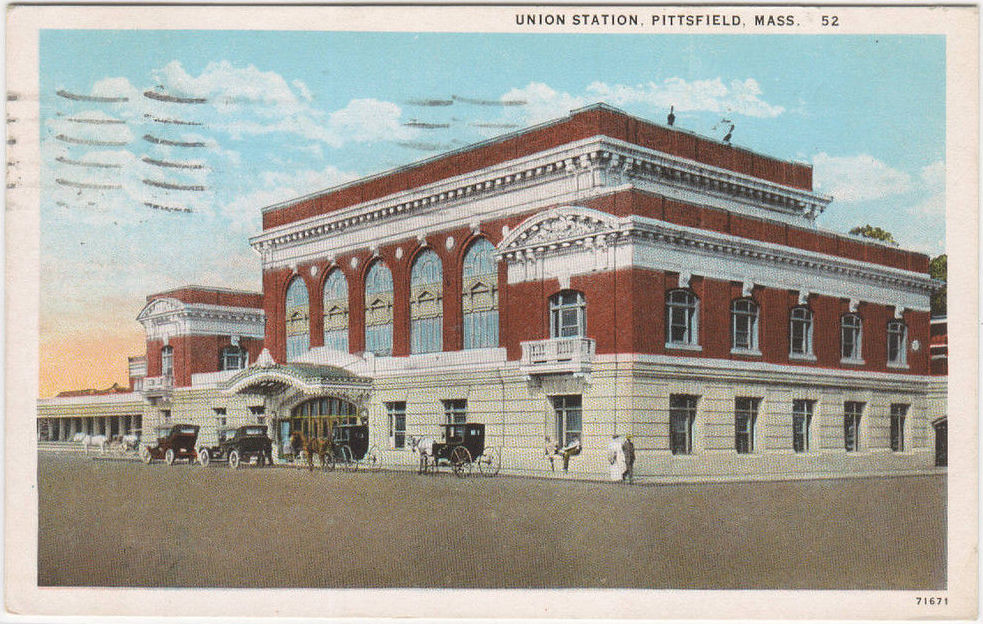
Pittsfield Union Station was demolished in the 1960s

The rise of automobile ownership and the construction of the I-90/Massachusetts Turnpike drastically reduced passenger demand on the Boston-Pittsfield corridor. B&A service was also cut due to financial problems in the late 1930s and again after World War II; by 1950, Pittsfield was served by eight Boston-Albany round trips per day. On April 24, 1960, stops west of Framingham except for Worcester, Palmer, Springfield, and Pittsfield were closed; Boston-Albany service via Pittsfield was reduced to just 3.5 daily round trips.

The NYC merged into the Penn Central Railroad on February 1, 1968, followed by the New Haven Railroad on December 31. Penn Central continued to run the daily Boston-Albany train (the former, nameless New England States) through Pittsfield until April 30, 1971.

The intercity trips were taken over by Amtrak on May 1, 1971. Service between Worcester and Albany along the Boston and Albany Railroad route was discontinued, leaving Pittsfield with no passenger rail service for the first time in 130 years. Two weeks after taking over service, Amtrak added the Boston-New Haven Bay State, which restored service as far west as Springfield; however, this service proved unpopular and was discontinued on March 1, 1975. The MBTA began subsidizing Penn Central's commuter rail service between Boston and Framingham in January 1973. On January 27, 1973, the MBTA acquired the line east of Framingham. Penn Central service beyond Framingham was discontinued October 27, 1975, as the state did not subsidize it. In response, Amtrak revived the New York-Chicago Lake Shore Limited on October 31, 1975, with a new section running on the Boston-Albany mainline and thus restoring service between Pittsfield and Boston.

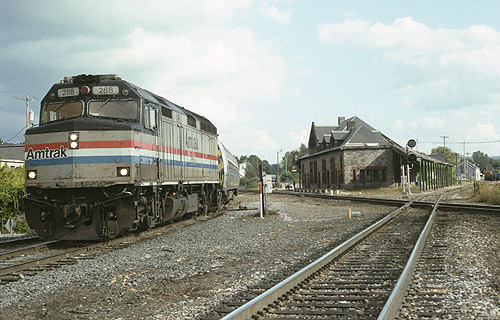
Vermonter passing the defunct Palmer Union Station in 1997

Conrail took over Penn Central on April 1, 1976. On September 26, 1994, some rush hour trains started to serve Worcester on Conrail trackage (which became CSX trackage on June 1, 1999), extending to other times beginning on December 14, 1996. Prior to 2004, select Northeast Regional trains would offer a Springfield-Boston service via the so-called Inland Route. This route traveled northward from New Haven through central Connecticut and western Massachusetts, passing through Hartford and Springfield, then turned eastward and through Worcester and Framingham en route to South Station. With the electrification of the Northeast Corridor in 2000, Springfield–Boston service along the slower Inland Route (2:05 hours longer from Boston–New York City) was gradually reduced, with the last train discontinued in 2004. The MBTA acquired the rest of the line from Framingham to Worcester as part of an agreement announced in 2009. A 2012 agreement transferred ownership and control of the corridor from CSX to the Commonwealth of Massachusetts between Worcester and South Station in Boston.

=== Current services ===
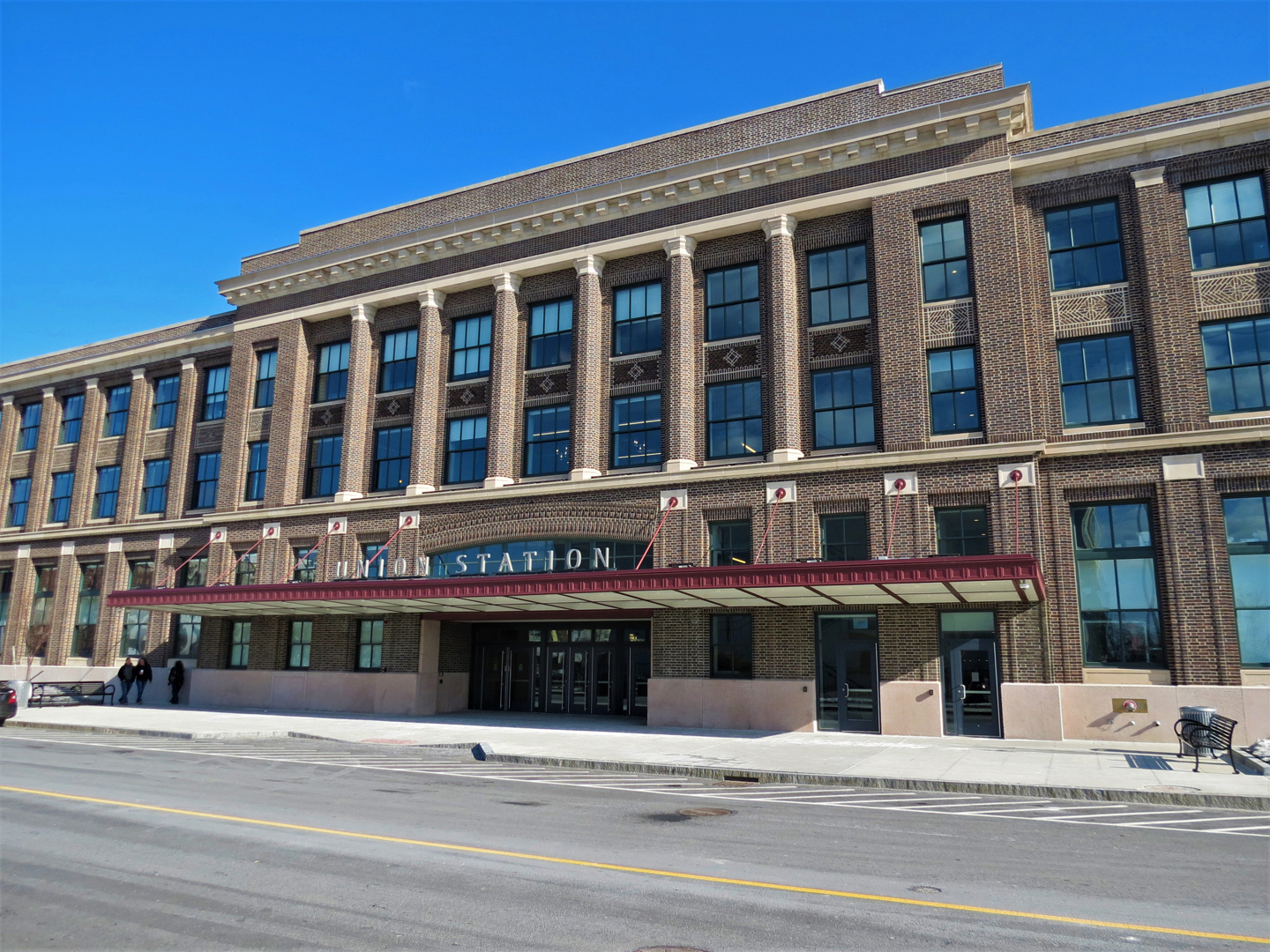
View of the restored Springfield Union Station

CSX owns the former B&A mainline between Worcester to Pittsfield and operates freight services on the entire corridor within Massachusetts. The mainline is divided into two CSX subdivisions: the Boston Subdivision runs from Back Bay to Wilbraham (CSX has operating rights on the MBTA-owned segments) while the Berkshire Subdivision runs from Wilbraham to Schodack, New York.

Amtrak's Lake Shore Limited provides a single round trip per day with stops at Pittsfield, Springfield, Worcester and Boston within the state of Massachusetts. The MBTA operates commuter services between South Station and Worcester Union as the Framingham/Worcester line. Springfield Union Station remains a major hub for New England services including the Valley Flyer, Vermonter, Northeast Regional, Amtrak's Hartford Line and CTrail's Hartford Line. Until 2022, Pittsfield was only serviced by Lake Shore Limited trains; the Berkshire Flyer was introduced in the summer of 2022 as a seasonal weekend-only New York City-Pittsfield extension of Amtrak's Empire Service. The service is funded by the Massachusetts Senate to facilitate tourism to the Berkshires.

== Current route limitations ==
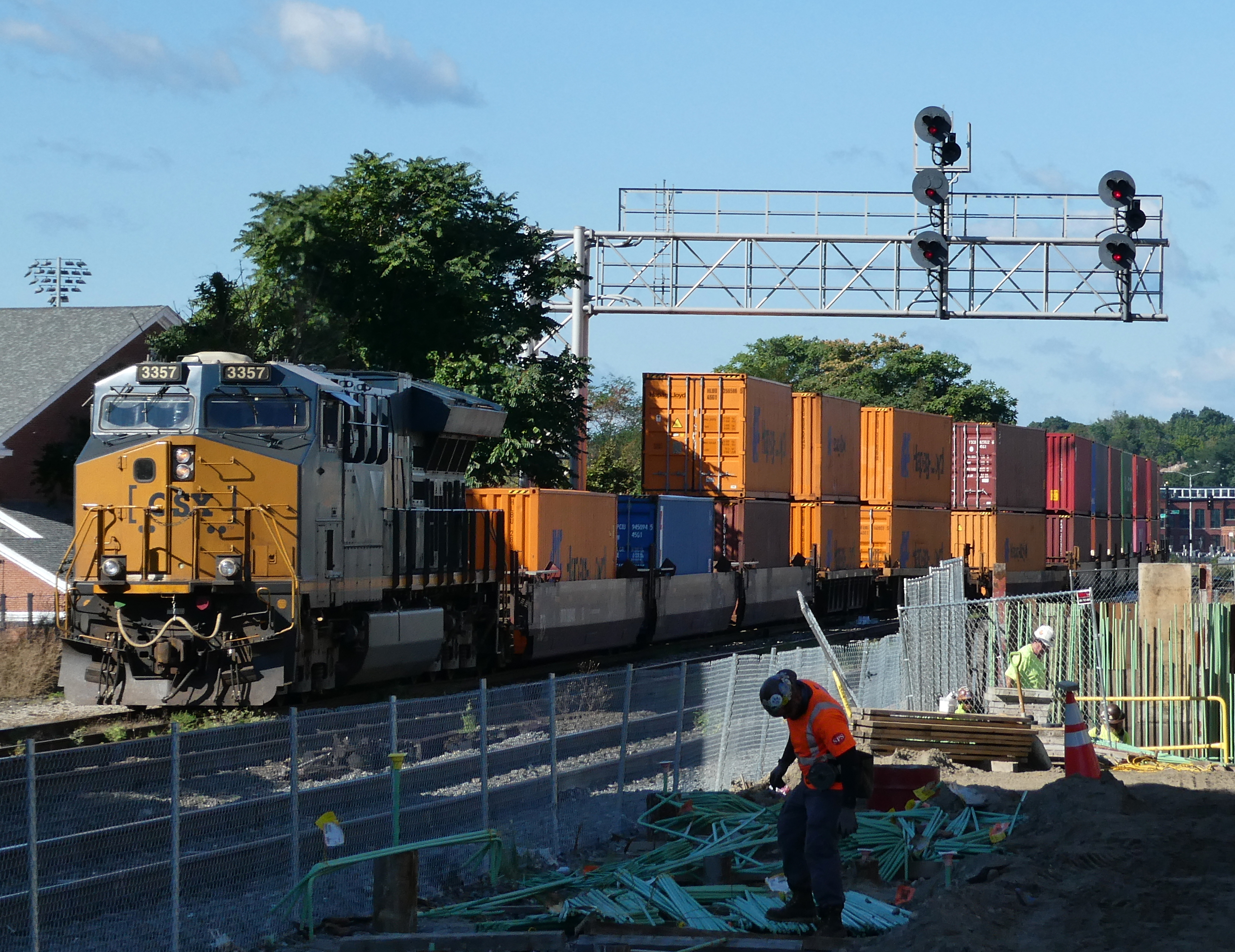
CSX freight passing Worcester Union Station

Several factors have limited the expansion of east-to-west passenger services on the Albany-Boston corridor. Unlike the MBTA Commuter Rail network, the state of Massachusetts does not own the trackage between Pittsfield and Worcester; arrangements would have to be made with CSX in order to run more passenger trains on the line. Passenger and freight shared-use rail operations create challenges for scheduling, dispatch, and the need for suitable track infrastructure and signal equipment; passenger services that operate on freight rail lines often require investment to install some combination of double-tracking, passing sidings, new track, and higher-capacity signal systems. Amtrak has the right to provide passenger service on freight-owned lines while the host railroad has the right to set the terms for an operating agreement; however, the MBTA and MassDOT are not eligible to directly utilize these legal provisions.

Much of the former double-track between Worcester and Pittsfield had been removed during the 1980s. The 52-mile Springfield to Pittsfield segment of the corridor includes 13.5 miles of single track rail alignment and the Worcester to Springfield segment includes mostly single-track rail alignment, with 33 miles of single track and only 21 miles of double-track. In order to facilitate more frequent rail operations, most of the former double-tracked sections would have to be restored. Signaling and communication implementation also presents an issue- CSX has implemented Interoperable Electronic Train Management System (I-ETMS) between Pittsfield and Worcester, while the MBTA uses the Advanced Civil Speed Enforcement System (ACSES) between Worcester and Boston. For any trains operating in both CSX and MBTA jurisdictions, locomotives will need both systems to safely operate.

== East-west service studies ==
=== Northern New England Intercity Rail Initiative Study (2013-2016) ===
In 2016 the Massachusetts Department of Transportation and the Vermont Agency of Transportation, in coordination with the Connecticut Department of Transportation, completed a three-year feasibility and planning study known as the Northern New England Intercity Rail Initiative. The lead consultant for the study was HDR Engineering. The firm AECOM was the primary sub-consultant. The study recommended a Boston-to-Springfield-to-New Haven intercity route with a maximum speed of 79 miles-per-hour. Despite this, the proposal was never pursued, and funding for the project was never allocated.

=== East-West Passenger Rail Study (2018-2021) ===
In January 2021, MassDOT completed a two-year study, known as the East-West Passenger Rail Study, that examined the feasibility of passenger rail service from Boston to Springfield and Pittsfield. Original considerations for an East-West Rail corridor considered either using the Boston and Albany mainline or the construction of a brand new mainline that would parallel the Mass Pike. The study preferred the Boston and Albany mainline route and recommended three out of six possible build alternatives which recommended between seven and nine new round-trip trains between Boston, Springfield and Pittsfield on this corridor. Proposed line upgrades include double tracking, signaling upgrades and rail upgrades to facilitate higher speeds. Each of the three build alternatives call for stations in Palmer and Chester. Chester and Palmer had train stations along the rail line in the past, but those are no longer extant and would require new stations. Service delivery indicates diesel push-pull operations and call for top speeds of either 60 or 109 miles per hour. Other build alternatives considered a Springfield-Boston route with bus transfers to Pittsfield and high-speed rail; however, these options were ruled out.

- Final Alternative 3 would provide direct passenger rail service between Pittsfield and Boston along a shared CSX and MBTA corridor. Up to eight round trips (seven new east–west round trips) could be provided, with an average travel time of 3:09 hours between Pittsfield and Boston, and 1:57 hour between Springfield and Boston. Additional new stations would be built in Chester and Palmer. The cost for this alternative was estimated at $2.4 billion.
- Final Alternative 4 would provide direct passenger rail service between Pittsfield and Springfield along a shared CSX corridor, along an independent passenger track between Springfield and Worcester, and along a shared MBTA corridor between Worcester and Boston. Up to 10 round trips (nine new east–west round trips) could be provided, with an average travel time of 2:59 hours between Pittsfield and Boston, and 1:47 hour between Springfield and Boston. Additional new stations would include Chester and Palmer. The cost for this alternative estimated at $3.9 billion.
- Hybrid Alternative 4/5 would provide direct passenger rail service between Pittsfield and Springfield along a shared CSX corridor, along an independent passenger track with high-speed shortcuts between Springfield and Worcester, and along a shared MBTA corridor between Worcester and Boston. Up to 10 round trips (nine new east–west round trips) could be provided, with an average travel time of 2:49 hours between Pittsfield and Boston, and 1:37 hour between Springfield and Boston. Additional new stations would include Chester and Palmer. The cost for this option was estimated to be $4.6 billion.

=== Amtrak ConnectsUS Plan (2021) ===
In Summer 2021, Amtrak published a comprehensive fifteen-year service expansion plan that included a new service between Albany and Boston; this planned service coincided with MassDOT's East-West Rail proposal. The service was modeled to operate similarly to Amtrak's other diesel intercity services that run on freight trackage such as the Pennsylvanian and Empire Service.

=== Northern Tier Passenger Rail (2019-2024) ===
A proposal known as Northern Tier Passenger Rail was subject to a planning study by MassDOT. The proposed corridor would expand passenger rail service west of Fitchburg through Greenfield and terminate at North Adams, following the existing Pan Am Southern rail corridor. The line would connect Berkshire, Franklin, Worcester, Middlesex, and Suffolk counties in northwestern Massachusetts with North Station. In January 2023, MassDOT reported that initial estimates of the total cost for corridor track upgrades would cost between $1.044 billion to $2.187 billion and would take around three years to construct. Suggested infill stations include Shelburne Falls, Millers Falls, Orange, Gardner, and Cambridge. Both diesel-powered and electrified service alternatives have been studied. A draft final report for the study was released in August 2024.

=== Compass Rail (2023) ===
In October 2023, MassDOT indicated new plans for a statewide intercity rail service vision called Compass Rail, which mostly concerns improvements to passenger rail corridors in Western Massachusetts. The "Compass" terminology refers to proposed and existing east-west and north-south passenger rail services that intersect at Springfield Union Station. Currently, East-West Rail is the only new rail service outlined within the plan, with other services consisting of existing CT Rail and Amtrak services on the Hartford and Connecticut River lines. A Compass Rail director was appointed in February 2024.

== Service development ==
=== Early planning ===
In 2022, Massachusetts leveraged CSX's acquisition of Pan Am Railways to secure commitments for improved passenger service between Boston and Pittsfield, as required by the Surface Transportation Board. Former Governor Charlie Baker supported creating a Western Massachusetts rail authority, while Governor Maura Healey appointed a dedicated East-West Rail director on February 6, 2024, to oversee major contracts and project coordination. The state established the Western Massachusetts Passenger Rail Commission (WMPRC) in mid-2022. The 19-member body reviewed the 2021 East-West Rail study and was tasked with recommending governance structures. The WMPRC issued its final report on November 21, 2023 and advised against forming a new authority, recommending that MassDOT oversee East-West Rail. In addition, the report emphasized the need to expand South Station’s capacity and noted that projected capital costs had risen 30% since 2020. The commission was dissolved after releasing its final report.

In 2022, East-West Rail planning was split into two phases: Phase 1 (referred as the Inland Route) would consist of expanded Boston-Springfield-New Haven service and Springfield-area track work (increase to 3 total Boston-Springfield trips), while Phase 2 (referred as the Full Build) would consist of Boston-Albany services and an additional Inland Route trip (increase to 6 total Boston-Springfield trips). Phase 1 would upgrade the Boston-Springfield portion of the route to 80-mile-per-hour (130 km/h) and add two daily trains between New Haven Union Station and South Station via Amtrak's Hartford Line through Springfield in addition to supplementing the single Lake Shore Limited trip; a new infill station in the town of Palmer would be constructed. Phase 1 construction is projected to begin in 2027 with service starting in 2030. Phase 2 Boston-Albany service is currently subject to a 2-year service development plan. The plan will study the implementation of up to three daily Boston-Albany round trips (two new trips supplementing the Lake Shore Limited) and identify necessary track improvements. There is no timeline for Full Build implementation, with current estimates for completion by 2045.

=== Funding ===
Massachusetts has advanced East-West Rail through a combination of state appropriations and federal grant applications:

- In 2022, the state allocated $275 million through an infrastructure bond bill with the intent of leveraging funds from the 2021 Bipartisan Infrastructure Law.
- In June 2023, MassDOT approved $12.5 million for Palmer station design and Pittsfield area track improvements.
- In September 2023, $108 million was awarded through the Consolidated Rail Infrastructure and Safety Improvement (CRISI) program for corridor upgrades between Springfield and Worcester.
- In December 2023, $500,000 was allocated for corridor improvements through the Corridor Identification and Development Program (Corridor ID).
- In June 2024, the state allocated $1.75 million to Springfield area track reconfiguration.
- In July 2024, MassDOT committed $123 million to advance track and station improvements.
- In October 2024, MassDOT received a $36.8 million CRISI grant for Springfield area track reconfiguration.
- In January 2025, MassDOT received a $108 million CRISI grant for Worcester-Springfield corridor improvements.
- In May 2025, MassDOT received $3.56 million in Corridor ID funds to advance Springfield-Albany corridor planning.
- In July 2025, the state allocated $3.5 million for Springfield area track reconfiguration.
- In October 2026, MassDOT was awarded a $130 million CRISI grant for Springfield Union Station improvements and a $30 million USDOT grant for West Springfield area grade crossing elimination. In addition, MassDOT committed $30 million to Pittsfield station track improvements and platform expansion study.

=== Corridor improvement projects ===
MassDOT has initiated several projects to support Phase 1 and 2 of East-West Rail:

Project Title	Locale	Overview	Status	Projected Completion
Phase 1 (Inland Route)
Springfield Area Track Reconfiguration	Springfield, MA	Includes track capacity expansion, layover, and Springfield Union Station expansion.	Funded	2030
Inland Route Corridor Improvements	Worcester-Springfield, MA	Track alignment, double-tracking, signal improvements along CSX-owned trackage.	Funded	2029-2030
Palmer Station	Palmer, MA	Construction of an 800-foot (240-meter) accessible side platform infill station 0.5 miles (0.80 km) east of historic Palmer Union Station site.	Design funded, construction unfunded	Early 2030s
Grafton Freight Siding	North Grafton, MA	Construct a 1.6-mile (2.6 km) freight siding to improve interchange with the Grafton & Upton Railroad.	Funded	2029-2030
Springfield Maintenance/Layover Facility	Springfield	Construction of new dedicated maintenance and layover facilities for Airo trainsets.	Unfunded	2029
Worcester Union Station (Second Platform)	Worcester, MA	MBTA project; station reconstructed as fully accessible 800-foot island platform.	Completed	Complete 2025
Worcester Line Third Track	Framingham-Weston, MA	MBTA project; proposed third mainline track to improve Framingham/Worcester Line and Amtrak capacity.	Unfunded	N/A
Phase 2 (Full Build)
West Springfield At-Grade Crossing Removal	West Springfield, MA	Construction of road overpasses to replace two at-grade crossings.	Funded	2029-2030
Pittsfield Track Capacity	Pittsfield	Track capacity improvements surrounding Scelsi ITC for near-term Berkshire Flyer service and second platform feasibility study.	Funded	2029-2030
Boston & Albany Service Development Plan	Albany, NY, to Boston, MA	Infrastructure and service needs study for Full Build implementation.	Funded	2028-2030

=== Rolling stock ===
Amtrak Airo trainsets will be procured for revenue service.

Initial plans for East-West Rail indicated the use of GE Genesis locomotives with Amfleet coaches and cab cars used on Amtrak's Hartford Line, with previous plans suggesting trains would layover and be serviced at a new MBTA maintenance facility located at Widett Circle within Boston. By February 2026, MassDOT determined that Amtrak's existing fleet was "no longer reliable to operate" and coordinated with Amtrak to secure 2 new Airo intercity trainsets for Inland Route service by 2030. MassDOT plans to construct a new layover and maintenance facility for the Airo trainsets in Springfield by 2029; additionally, Amtrak will upgrade Southampton Yard in Boston to accommodate the new rolling stock.

The procurement of alternative rolling stock for East-West Rail service had been previously discussed. In May 2024, former Massachusetts Transportation Secretary Monica Tibbits-Nutt expressed interest in utilizing zero-emission multiple units (ZEMU) for future statewide intercity passenger rail services; however, this was not formally proposed and is not planned. Advocates have called for decarbonized service for East-West Rail and other passenger rail services.

== Project concerns ==
In 2022 the transit watchdog group TransitMatters released a plan called "90 Minutes To Springfield" which called into question aspects of MassDOT's East-West Rail Study. TransitMatters called MassDOT cost estimates for East-West Rail service "bloated" and they questioned why MassDOT's East-West Rail Study included no improvements for the MBTA Framingham/Worcester Line. The Western Mass Rail Coalition, a consortium of several rail advocacy groups in Western Massachusetts, also objected to MassDOT's East-West Rail Study due to exorbitant project costs in relation to the type of service delivery that was proposed.

At times media outlets have presented the project as an extension of the MBTA commuter rail or a high-speed rail corridor which has at times led to the project being publicly perceived differently from its proposed intent.

State Representative Smitti Pignateli said in an editorial in 2022 that East-West Rail should be integrated as a part of a greater vision for statewide regional rail under the authority of a single statewide agency. Regional equity between the eastern and western regions of Massachusetts has also been a matter of contention; at a meeting of the Western Massachusetts Passenger Rail Commission on January 24, 2023, State Representative Natalie Blais said that it was important there is western Massachusetts-based control for East-West Rail and that if the service is managed from Boston the interests of people living in western parts of the state might not be properly represented. Later on August 1, 2023, an editorial would reiterate this sentiment by criticizing the Legislature's decision to omit funding for East-West Rail from the 2023 Massachusetts state budget and accused Eastern Massachusetts lawmakers as being Boston-centric; the editorial points that the budget's $477 million investment for transportation includes $205 million for the MBTA but excludes funding for East-West Rail.

In February 2024, State Representative William Pignatelli expressed concern that MassDOT and the state Legislature had failed to address the immediate need to expand capacity at South Station to support East-West Rail service which could potentially jeopardize the viability of the project. In October 2024, city officials in Westfield expressed concerns that a station site within the municipality was not under consideration by MassDOT for East-West Rail. Westfield is one of several municipalities along the Boston-Albany corridor that have expressed regional equity concerns within the East-West Rail planning process.

In December 2024, Palmer officials and residents opposed MassDOT's proposed Palmer Amtrak station site locations due to not being located downtown or near the former Palmer Union Station site. Following MassDOT's selection of a station site outside of downtown Palmer in February 2025, residents and advocates condemned the decision, and accused MassDOT of failing to engage with the community. Palmer officials voiced they would seek to impose land use regulations to prohibit passenger rail terminals outside of downtown. In March 2025, State Senator Peter Durant opposed the East-West Rail project, arguing that its high costs were unjustified given the infrequent service and slow speeds it would offer; he instead advocated for redirecting all available funding towards improvements for the Massachusetts Bay Transit Authority.

=== Electrification ===
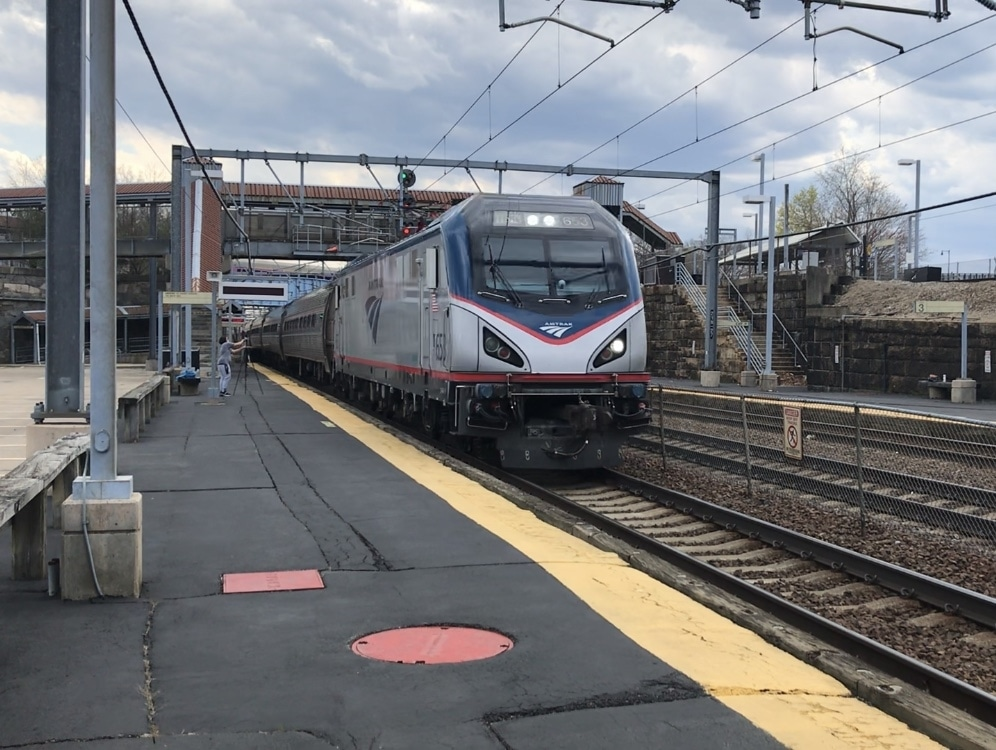
Advocacy groups have called for East-West Rail to be electrified like Amtrak's Northeast Corridor

Lawmakers, advocates and news media has been critical of the decision to operate diesel locomotives for East-West Rail, citing environmental and operational concerns, and have called for the service to be electrified. A grade-separated high-speed rail corridor was the only electrified alternative assessed in the initial East-West Rail Study; electrification for the B&A mainline was not considered, nor were upgrades to the MBTA Framingham/Worcester Line. The high-speed rail alternative was not advanced by MassDOT due to costs outweighing potential benefits, which precluded the possibility that electrification would be included during the corridor planning phase.

TransitMatter's "90 Minutes To Springfield" plan called for the East-West Rail project, along with all future rail projects in Massachusetts, to be fully electrified to meet state environmental goals and claimed that MassDOT did not give due diligence to the electrification of the B&A mainline for the enhanced service alternatives. In April 2023, Representative Seth Moulton criticized MassDOT's plan to run diesel trains on the East-West Rail corridor; instead, Moulton expressed support for revising current East-West Rail plans to instead prioritize high-speed rail service between Boston and Pittsfield.

== See also ==
- South Coast Rail
- Northern Tier Passenger Rail
- Central Corridor Rail Line
- Connecticut River Line
