= Central Corridor Rail Line =

Proposed railway service in the United States

Overview
- Status: Dormant proposal
- Locale: New England
- Termini: New London; Brattleboro
- Stations: 10 (8 new; 2 serve other routes)

Service
- Type: Regional rail

Technical
- Track gauge: 4 ft 8 1/2 in (1,435 mm)

The Central Corridor Rail Line is a proposed passenger service route between New London, Connecticut, and Brattleboro, Vermont. A primary purpose of the proposed service was to provide a rail link between state flagship schools UConn, UMass Amherst, and UVM.

In 2017 the Massachusetts Department of Transportation completed Central Corridor Passenger Rail Feasibility Study. No further action was taken upon completion of the study.

== History ==
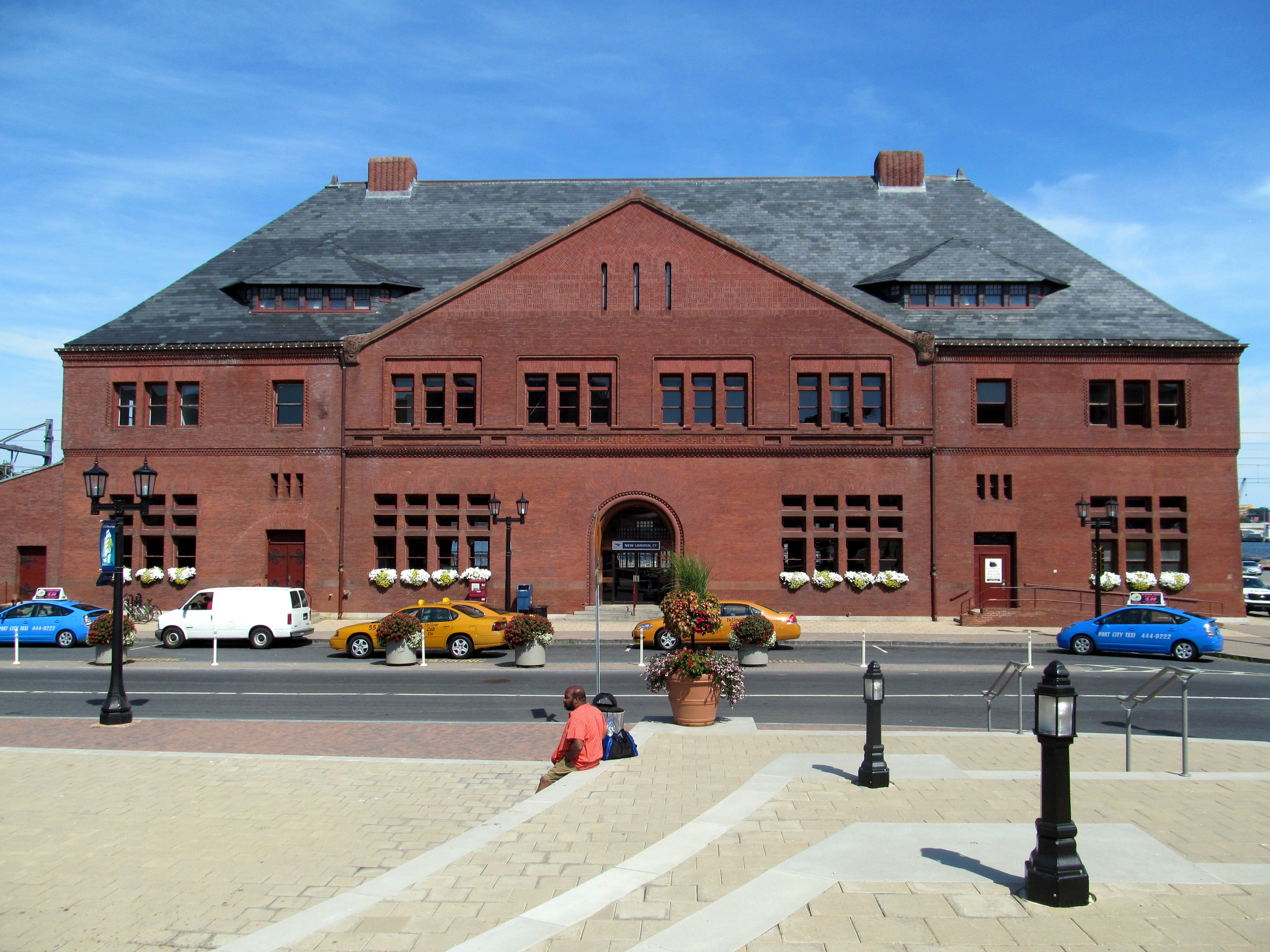
New London Union Station, the proposed southern terminus of the Central Corridor line

=== Previous service ===
The New London, Willimantic, and Palmer Railroad opened from New London, Connecticut, to Palmer, Massachusetts, in September 1850. It was extended to Amherst in May 1853 by the NLW&P-leased Amherst and Belchertown Railroad, which failed and was reorganized as the Amherst, Belchertown and Palmer in 1858. The New London Northern Railroad acquired the NLW&P (which had failed in 1859) in 1861, and the AB&P in 1864. In 1867, it extended the line north to Millers Falls.

In 1870, the Rutland Railroad leased an 1849-built Vermont and Massachusetts Railroad line from Millers Falls to Brattleboro, Vermont. Originally the V&M mainline, it became a minor branch when the V&M decided to expand west through the Hoosac Tunnel instead. Soon after, the Rutland was taken over by the Vermont Central Railroad, which then leased the NLN in December 1871. The VC collapsed in 1873 and was taken over by the Central Vermont Railway, which continued to lease the NLN.

The Central Vermont became part of the Grand Trunk Railway in 1899, which in turn was nationalized by the Canadian government in 1922. Passenger service on the line ended on September 27, 1947. The line was sold to RailTex in 1995 and operated as the New England Central Railroad. RailTex was merged into RailAmerica in 2000, which in turn was acquired by the Genesee & Wyoming company in 2012.

=== Montrealer and Vermonter ===
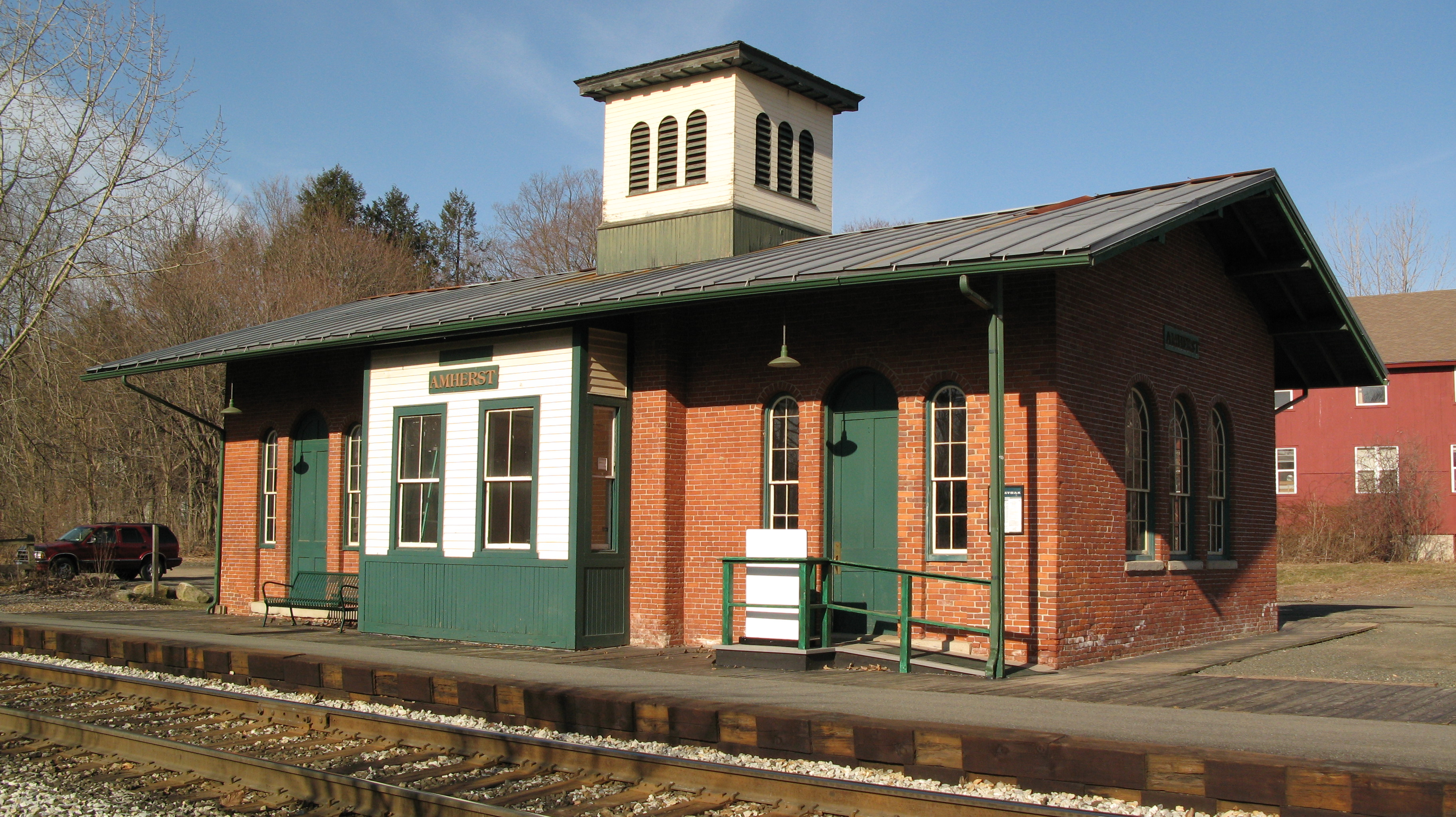
Service to Amherst ended on the Vermonter in 2014

From its reinstatement in 1989, the overnight Montrealer (the direct predecessor of the Vermonter) ran along the Central Vermont from New London to Brattleboro and beyond. Amherst was at first the only station stop between New London to Brattleboro, which was traversed late at night in both directions; a stop at Willimantic was added in 1991.

After fiscal issues in 1995, the Montrealer was cut back to St. Albans and moved to a daytime schedule as the Vermonter. It was rerouted over the Springfield Line between New Haven and Springfield, and the Boston Subdivision from Springfield to Palmer, Massachusetts. At Palmer the train reversed directions and continued north along the Central Vermont (which was sold to the New England Central Railroad that year).

On December 29, 2014, the Vermonter was rerouted onto the Conn River Line between Springfield and Northfield, Massachusetts, after the line received major upgrades. This eliminated the reverse move at Palmer, which led to faster service, and added stations at Holyoke, Northampton, and Greenfield; however, it ended direct service to Amherst.

=== Modern planning ===
Preparing the line for passenger service would require refurbishing the New England Central Railroad tracks, which also carry freight to New London's deepwater port. The northernmost section, in Vermont, has been upgraded to continuously welded rail via a $50 million ARRA grant. New England Central estimates that similar upgrades (which include upgrading the track to standard 286,000 pound car loads) from the Massachusetts / Vermont border to New London would cost $18 million, while the full project including stations and rolling stock would cost $150 million.

During the building of Foxwoods Casino and Mohegan Sun Casino in the 1990s and 2000s, commuter rail service was considered on the New London to Norwich section of the line to reduce traffic impacts on Route 2. However, upgrades to Route 2 were selected instead.

In October 2012, an excursion train was run to raise support for the project, which has been endorsed by a number of the town governments along the line. In November 2012, officials from Mansfield, New London, Norwich, and Windham (all of which will be served by station stops) plus the Southeastern Connecticut Council of Governments signed an agreement to pursue funding for the service.

In January 2014, it was announced that backers of the line would try to seek federal funding in order to get the line funded. Congressman Joe Courtney supported the project, along with Connecticut State Senator Cathy Osten. In September 2014, NECR was awarded a $8.2 million TIGER grant for upgrading 55 miles of track in Connecticut; the $10.5 million project is primarily for freight use but is also a prerequisite for any future passenger service.

In 2021, Connecticut lawmakers allocated $2.3 million for Connecticut Department of Transportation to study the expansion of the Shore Line East service east to Westerly, RI with the possibility of expansion north to Norwich, CT, with additional studies for infill stations along the two railways. The study concluded in Fall 2023, with a final report issued in November. It found that in the short term, expansion of bus service would be effective. In the long term, meanwhile, Shore Line East expansion could be useful, but perhaps not for years to come, given the lower population density in the area.

== Rolling stock ==
In 2010 a proposal was put forward to use refurbished Budd Rail Diesel Cars, which are less expensive to operate than conventional locomotive-and-carriage trains on lower-density routes like the Central Corridor. The refurbished RDCs would be capable of operating at speeds up to 80 miles per hour - the FRA limit on track speed on the corridor.

== Proposed stations ==
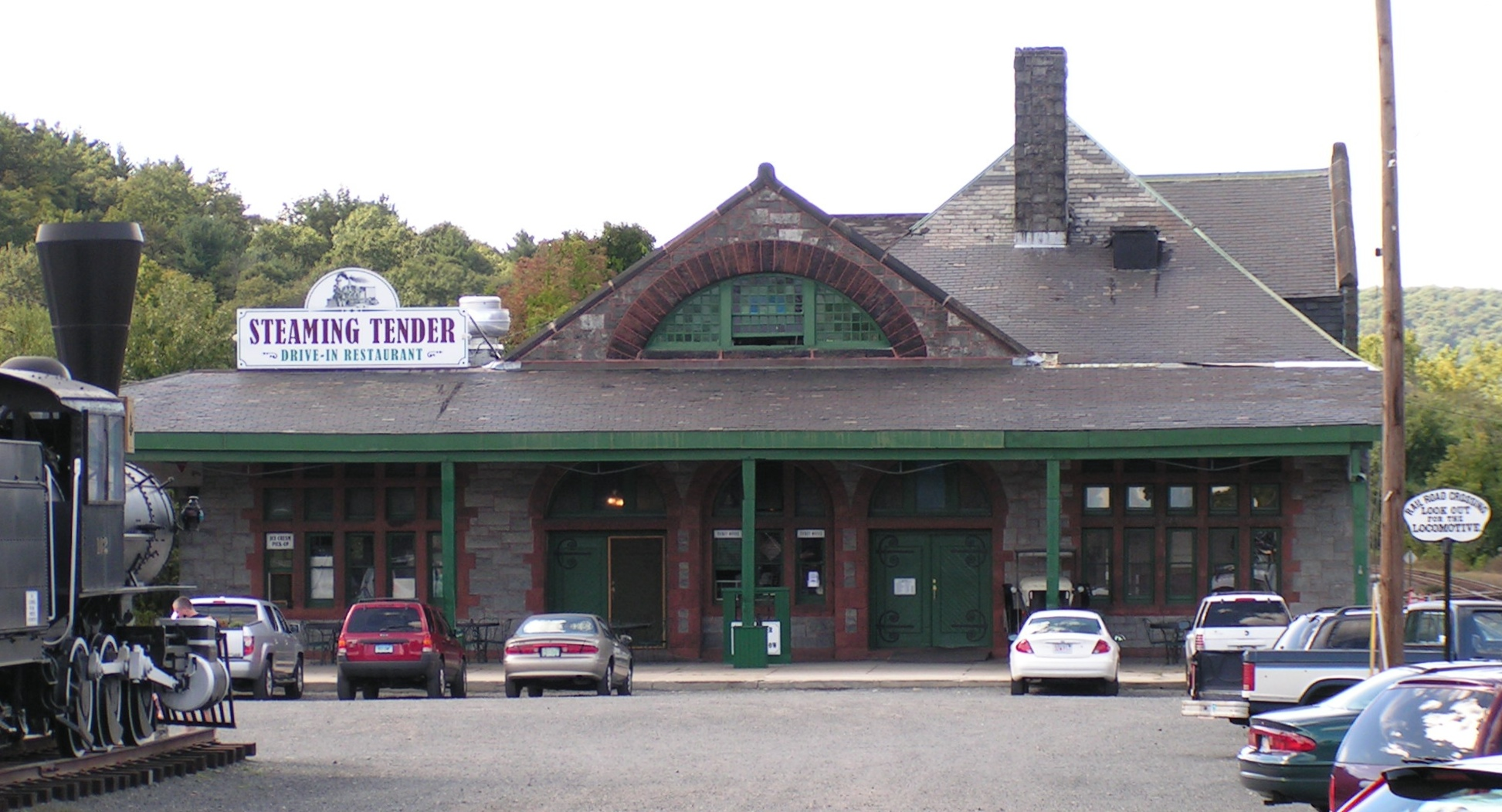
The historic Union Station building in Palmer, Massachusetts

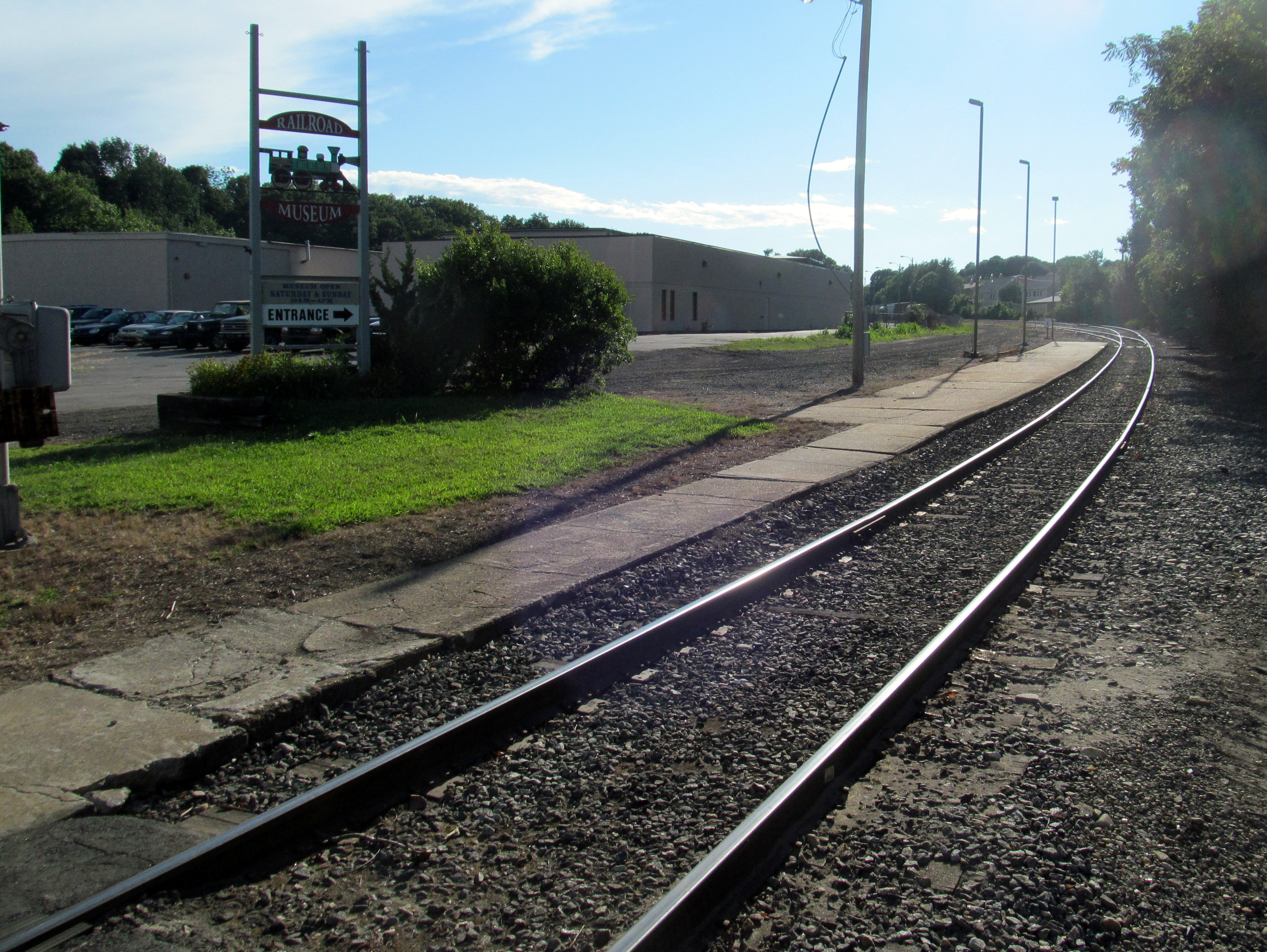
The former Amtrak station platform in Willimantic, Connecticut

State	City	Station	Notes
Vermont	Brattleboro	Brattleboro	Vermonter stop; connections to CRT and DVTA
Massachusetts	Montague	Millers Falls	Connection to FRTA
Massachusetts	Amherst	Amherst	Former Vermonter stop; connection to PVTA
Massachusetts	Palmer	Palmer	Connection to PVTA
Connecticut	Stafford	Stafford Springs	
Connecticut	Mansfield	Mansfield/Storrs	University of Connecticut; Connection to WRTD
Connecticut	Willimantic	Willimantic	Former Montrealer stop; Connection to WRTD
Connecticut	Norwich	Norwich	Connection to SEAT
Connecticut	Montville	Mohegan	Mohegan Sun casino
Connecticut	New London	Union Station	Connections to Amtrak, Shore Line East, SEAT, Cross Sound Ferry
