= Central Corridor =

Central Corridor can refer to the following:

- Central Corridor (Union Pacific Railroad), a rail line between Denver, Colorado and central Nevada
- Central Corridor Rail Line, a proposed passenger rail line through Connecticut, Massachusetts, and Vermont
- Central Corridor (Africa), a transport and trading route from Burundi, Rwanda, the DRC and Tanzania to the port of Dar es Salaam
- Central Corridor, the first segment of Denver's light rail system a light rail system, opened as the D Line (RTD)
- Central Corridor, a transit corridor between downtown Minneapolis and downtown St. Paul, primarily following University Avenue
  - METRO Green Line, a light rail line known as the Central Corridor during the planning and early construction phase
- An informal nickname for the office developments on Central Avenue, Phoenix, Arizona
