= Northern Tier Passenger Rail =

Proposed Massachusetts intercity rail project

Overview
- Status: Planned/Unfunded
- Locale: Western Massachusetts
- Predecessor: Boston and Maine Railroad
- Current operator: Amtrak (Proposed)

Route
- Distance travelled: 140 miles (230 km)

Technical
- Track gauge: 4 ft 8 1/2 in (1,435 mm) standard gauge
- Track owners: Massachusetts Bay Transit Authority, CSX

Northern Tier Passenger Rail (abbreviated NTPR) is a proposed intercity rail project in the U.S. state of Massachusetts that would restore passenger service along the Northern Tier corridor, which could connect North Adams, Greenfield, and possibly Albany to Boston. (Note: Project Alternative 5 in MassDOT's 2024 study included an extension of the corridor from North Adams to Albany, New York.) The line would connect Berkshire, Franklin, Worcester, Middlesex, and Suffolk counties in northwestern Massachusetts with North Station. NTPR was subject to a conceptual planning effort conducted by the Massachusetts Department of Transportation (MassDOT) to evaluate the feasibility of implementing daily Amtrak service along the Northern Tier corridor; the study was initiated in response to a legislative mandate included in the fiscal year 2020 Massachusetts state budget. The Northern Tier corridor was historically part of the Fitchburg Railroad, which operated passenger services as far as North Adams until the mid-20th century.

Northern Tier Passenger Rail stems from public demand for improved transit connectivity between Boston and Western Massachusetts, a region currently underserved by public transportation. The development of Northern Tier Passenger Rail is in the conceptual stage, and is often discussed in relation to other east-to-west intercity rail projects in Massachusetts such as East-West Rail and Compass Rail.

Despite advocacy and public support for the project, MassDOT's initial NTPR study concluded that the capital costs would be considerable, and identified possible next steps necessary to proceed with the project. The study noted that securing federal grant funding for the route could present a challenge, due in part to the concentration of projected ridership along the existing Fitchburg Line. In February 2025, it was announced that MassDOT were preparing to apply for USDOT funding by fall of that year.

== History ==
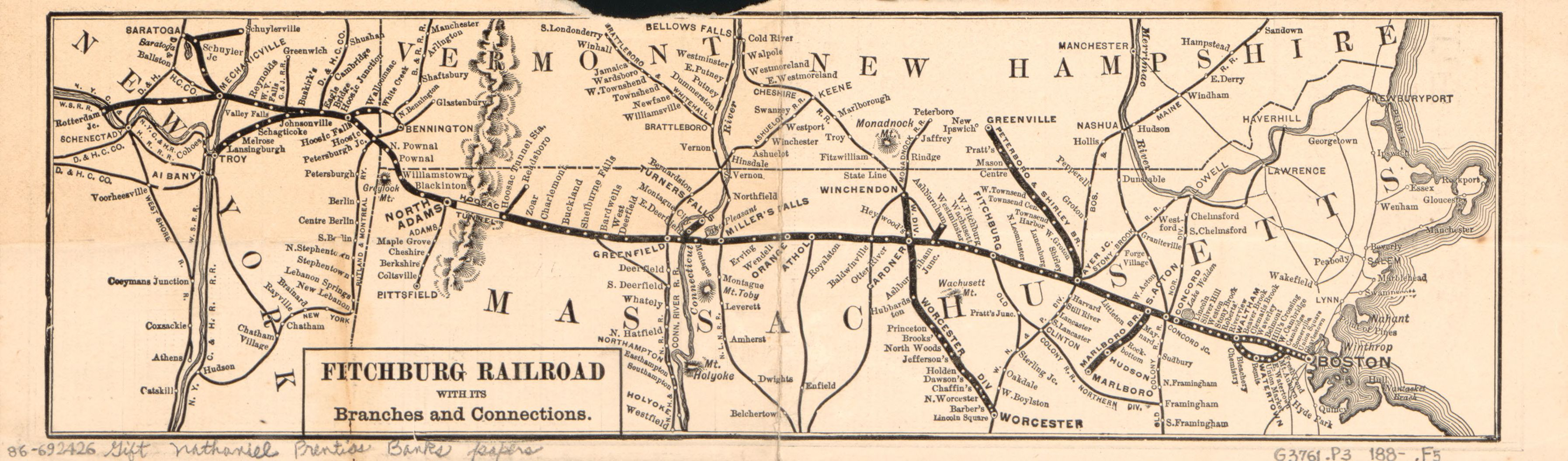
Map of the Fitchburg Railroad

The Fitchburg Railroad was established in 1842, initially connecting Boston with Fitchburg. The line was extended westward, eventually reaching North Adams in 1848 and continuing through the Hoosac Tunnel to connect with Troy, New York, in 1875. The construction of the Hoosac Tunnel was critical in establishing the Fitchburg Railroad as a key transportation route through the Berkshire Mountains. The tunnel, which took nearly 25 years to complete (from 1851 to 1875), was one of the longest tunnels in the world at the time of its completion.

In 1900, the Fitchburg Railroad was acquired by the Boston and Maine Railroad (B&M). The post-World War II era marked a significant decline in passenger rail service across the United States, including the Northern Tier. By the 1950s, service frequency along the Fitchburg line had decreased significantly. In 1960 when the Boston and Maine Railroad discontinued all passenger services west of Fitchburg, leaving the Northern Tier without any regular passenger rail service.

=== Current services ===
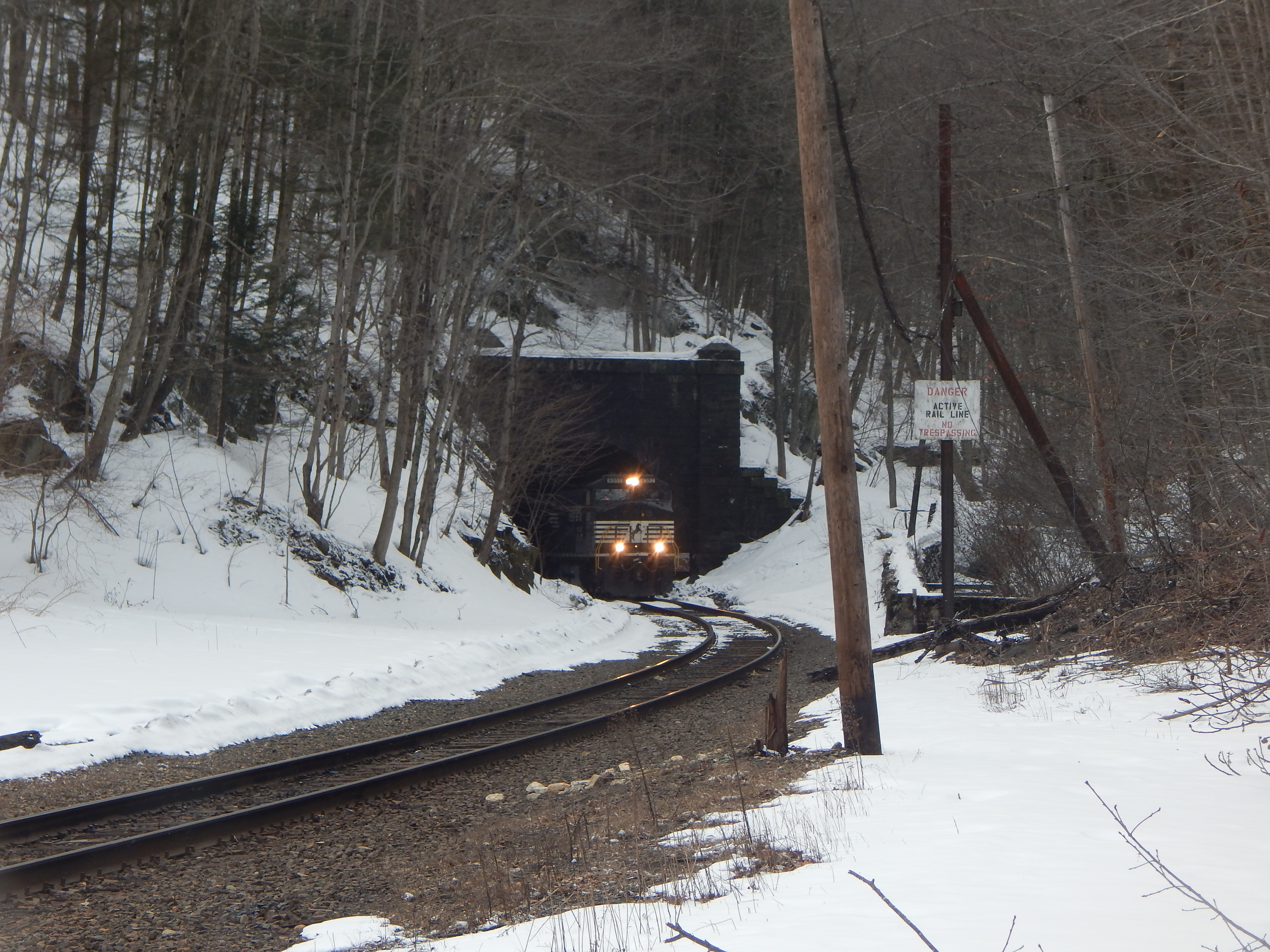
Eastbound PAS freight leaving the Hoosac Tunnel

As of 2026, the Northern Tier rail corridor is primarily used for freight services, with no regular passenger services that operate west of Fitchburg. The Massachusetts Bay Transportation Authority (MBTA) owns and operates portions of the eastern end of the corridor, specifically the Fitchburg Line, which serves MBTA Commuter Rail passengers between North Station in Boston and Wachusett Station in Fitchburg. Historically, the MBTA had previously operated services as far west as Gardner until 1986. Amtrak does not operate any intercity passenger services along the Northern Tier corridor.

The section west of Fitchburg, including the Pan Am Southern trackage through Greenfield and North Adams, is primarily under the control of freight operators. Pan Am Southern, a joint venture between Pan Am Railways (now part of CSX Transportation) and Norfolk Southern Railway, owns significant portions of this trackage. The current route mostly serves as an intermodal rail link for freight moving between New York, New England, and Canada, with significant traffic including paper and lumber. Freight trains share the corridor with MBTA Commuter Rail services on the eastern end of the route.

== Current route limitations ==
Several factors hinder the possible expansion of services on the Northern Tier corridor. The track infrastructure along the corridor varies significantly in quality. While the eastern portion of the route, particularly from Fitchburg to Boston, has undergone recent upgrades to support MBTA Commuter Rail services, the western sections—extending from Fitchburg to North Adams—are less developed. The tracks west of Fitchburg have seen minimal investment in recent decades, leading to issues such as lower speed limits and a lack of modern signaling systems. This reduces the viability of high-frequency passenger services and would require substantial investment to meet contemporary standards for passenger rail.

Portions of the Northern Tier corridor consists of single-track segments, particularly in the western regions of the route. Single-track operations limit the capacity and flexibility of the rail service, as trains traveling in opposite directions must wait for each other at designated passing points. This constraint complicates the scheduling of frequent passenger services and could lead to delays and reduced reliability unless additional tracks or sidings are constructed.

The current station infrastructure along the Northern Tier route is either outdated or, in many locations, entirely absent. Many of the original stations have been demolished or repurposed, and the few remaining stations would require significant upgrades to accommodate modern passenger rail services. This includes the need for ADA-compliant facilities, improved platforms, and better access to transportation links such as parking and bus services.

== Service restoration study ==
=== Massachusetts State Legislation and 2019 Transportation Bond Bill ===
The impetus for the for Northern Tier Passenger Rail Study came with the passage of the 2019 Massachusetts Transportation Bond Bill (Chapter 90 of the Acts of 2019). This legislation instructed the Massachusetts Department of Transportation to conduct a comprehensive study of passenger rail service along the Northern Tier corridor. The law directed MassDOT to explore various service options, assess infrastructure needs, and estimate the costs associated with reintroducing passenger service. Specifically, the legislation required MassDOT to:

- Evaluate the feasibility of passenger rail service between Boston, Greenfield, and North Adams.
- Consider different service models, including commuter, regional, and intercity rail.
- Estimate the costs of required infrastructure improvements, including track upgrades, station construction, and potential electrification.
- Assess potential ridership and the overall economic impact of reestablishing the service.

=== 2024 Northern Tier Passenger Rail Study ===
Following the directive from the 2019 Transportation Bond Bill, the Office of Transportation Planning within MassDOT launched an official study to examine and evaluate the costs and economic opportunities related to establishing rail service between the cities of North Adams and Greenfield, which culminated in the release of a draft final report in August 2024. This study is the first comprehensive analysis of the full corridor's potential for passenger service.

The draft final report evaluated multiple service scenarios, ranging from minimal investment options that would involve shared tracks with freight trains to more ambitious plans, including full overhead electrification and dedicated passenger rail infrastructure. The study also considered the environmental and economic benefits of the project, as well as the potential challenges, such as significant capital costs and the need for substantial infrastructure upgrades. The public comment period for the draft report closed on October 12, 2024.

The final study report was published by MassDOT on November 27, 2024. The report concluded that most projected ridership for the NTPR route would originate east of Fitchburg, primarily along the existing MBTA Fitchburg Line. As a result, MassDOT determined there would be limited benefit to extending passenger rail service west of Wachusett. Capital cost estimates for the proposed alternatives ranged from $878 million to $2.9 billion. Alternative 3, which proposed an electrified service, carried the highest estimated capital cost at approximately $2.9 billion, with annual operating and maintenance costs projected at $29.5 million. Although the study included a "No Build" scenario as a baseline, MassDOT did not recommend any build alternative and concluded that the project offered low return on investment. The agency stated that it would not pursue additional funding for further study and recommended that less costly alternatives, such as enhanced motorcoach service, be considered in the future.

Despite the findings, local officials and advocacy groups in Western Massachusetts continued to express support for the project, calling for additional studies and a comprehensive economic development analysis. In February 2025, MassDOT announced that it would submit the NTPR corridor for inclusion in the Federal Railroad Administration's Corridor Identification and Development (Corridor ID) program in Fall 2025.

== See also ==
- South Coast Rail
- East-West Passenger Rail
