= New London Northern Railroad =

Overview
- Operator: New England Central Railroad
- Locale: north from New London, Connecticut, into Vermont
- Dates of operation: 1849–1871
- Successor: Central Vermont Railway

Technical
- Track gauge: 4 ft 8 1/2 in (1,435 mm) standard gauge

The New London Northern Railroad was a part of the Central Vermont Railway from New London, Connecticut, north to Brattleboro, Vermont. After a long period with the Canadian National Railway, it is now operated by the New England Central Railroad. The New London Northern was the only through railroad in Connecticut not to come under the control of the New York, New Haven and Hartford Railroad.

== History ==
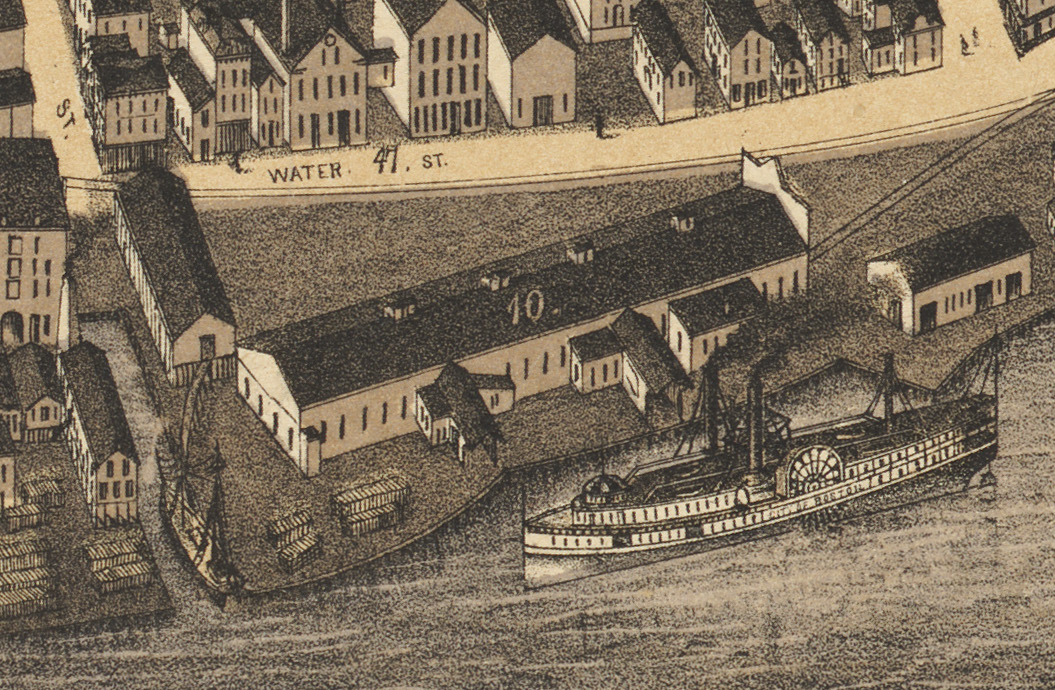
The company's station in New London, Connecticut, in 1876

The New London, Willimantic and Springfield Railroad was chartered in May 1847 to build from New London on the Long Island Sound north through Willimantic to Springfield, Massachusetts. On April 10, 1848, the name was changed to the New London, Willimantic and Palmer Railroad with the shift of the north terminus to Palmer. The first section, from Norwich north to Willimantic, opened in September 1849, and the part from Norwich south to New London opened the next month. The part north to Stafford opened in March 1850, and the rest of the way to Palmer opened in September of that year.

A steamship line continued from New London to New York City via the Long Island Sound.

The Amherst and Belchertown Railroad was chartered on May 24, 1851. Construction began on April 23, 1852, and the full line opened May 9, 1853, from Palmer north to Amherst via Belchertown and Dwight. It went bankrupt in 1857, was sold at auction on October 14, 1858, and was reorganized on November 23 of that year as the Amherst, Belchertown and Palmer Railroad.

The New London Northern Railroad succeeded the New London, Willimantic and Palmer on April 1, 1861. In March 1864, it bought the Amherst, Belchertown and Palmer, extending the line north to Amherst. An extension north to Millers Falls on the Vermont and Massachusetts Railroad opened in 1867.

On December 1, 1871, the Central Vermont Railroad leased the New London Northern and made it its Southern Division. The connection between the two lines was made over the Vermont Valley Railroad and the Vermont and Massachusetts Railroad's Brattleboro Branch.

The Ware River Railroad opened in stages from 1870 to 1873, running from Palmer north to Winchendon. It was leased to the New London Northern until April 1, 1873, when the Boston and Albany Railroad took it over.

On May 1, 1880, the New London Northern bought the branch of the Vermont and Massachusetts Railroad from Millers Falls north to Brattleboro, part of its original main line, extending the line north to Brattleboro. Just prior to that lease, in February, the 3 ft (914 mm) narrow gauge Brattleboro and Whitehall Railroad was leased, providing a branch from Brattleboro northwest to a dead end at South Londonderry (never extended as planned to Whitehall, New York).

In 1896, the Grand Trunk Railway bought the Central Vermont. The Grand Trunk was merged into the Canadian National Railway in 1923.

The Brattleboro and Whitehall Railroad went bankrupt and was foreclosed in March 1905. The West River Railroad was chartered in May of that year as a reorganization, and the line was converted to 4 ft 8 1/2 in (1,435 mm) standard gauge.

On February 3, 1995, the New London Northern's line became part of the New England Central Railroad, a regional railroad from New London north to East Alburg, Vermont. This change in operation was approved by the Interstate Commerce Commission on December 9, 1994.

== Branches ==
Palmertown

The Palmertown Branch ran west from Montville, Connecticut, to Palmertown.

Fitchville

The Fitchville Branch ran from Fitchville Junction, in the northwest part of Norwich, Connecticut, west to Fitchville.

Flynt's Granite

The Flynt Granite Company built the Flynt's Granite Branch Railroad to their quarries in Monson, Massachusetts. It was owned and operated by the granite company.

== Passenger service ==
As noted above, the Central Vermont Railway bought the NLN. The latter's passenger service appeared on 20th century passenger timetables as a division of the Central Vermont Railway. The CV continued passenger service on the Brattleboro - Amherst - Palmer - Norwich - New London route until September 27, 1947. The Mansfield stop provided the nearest point of rail access to the University of Connecticut at Storrs. In 1989 passenger service was restored on the line when Amtrak rerouted the Montrealer over the line, however, only with stops between the Atlantic Coast and the Vermont border being New London, Amherst and Palmer. (In 1991 Willimantic was added as an intermediate stop.) However, service on the line was eliminated in 1995.
