= New England Central Railroad =

Railroad company

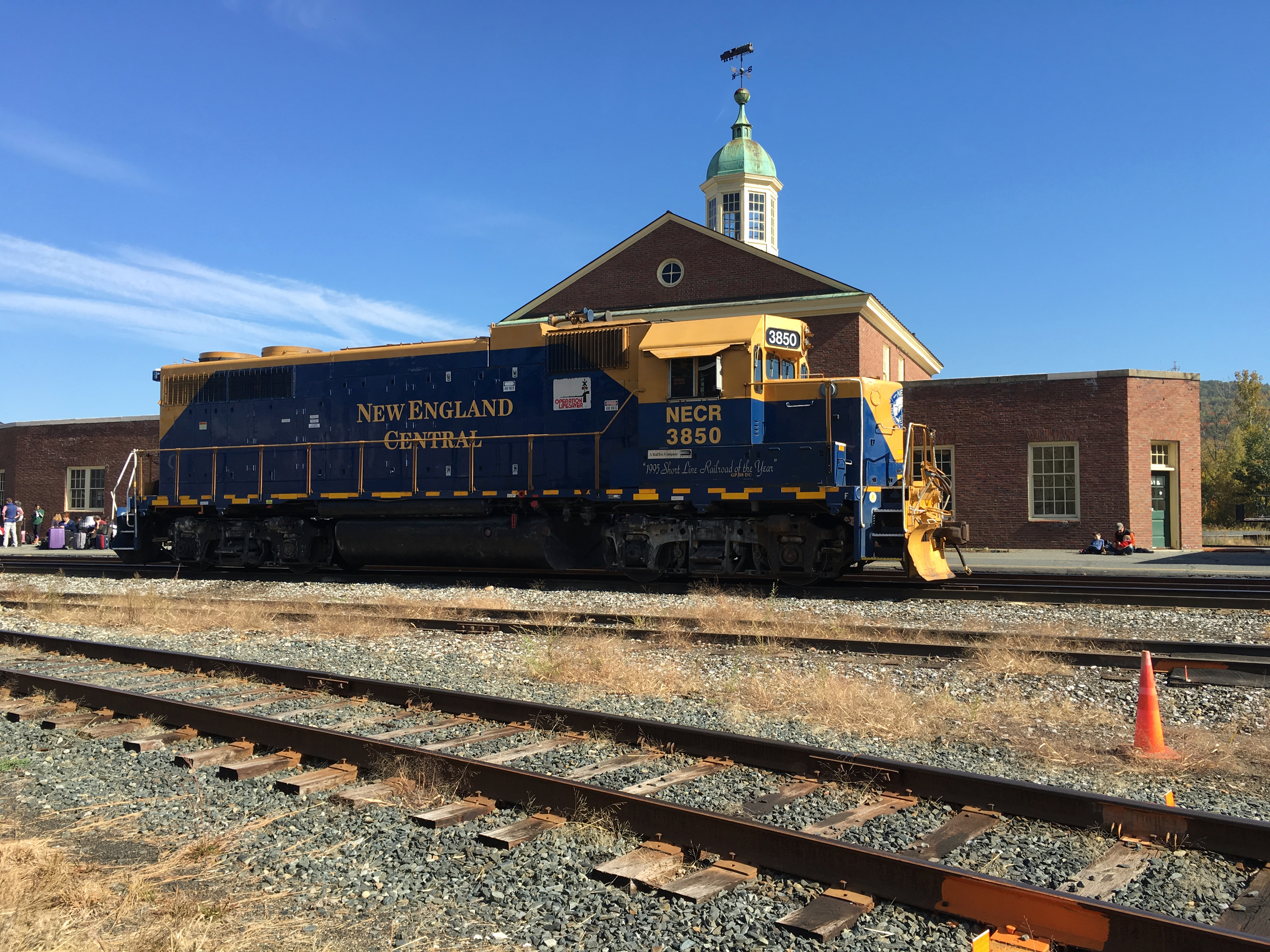
- A NECR GP38 at White River Junction, Vermont

Overview
- Parent company: Genesee and Wyoming
- Headquarters: St. Albans, Vermont
- Reporting mark: NECR
- Locale: New England
- Dates of operation: 1995–present
- Predecessor: Central Vermont Railway

Technical
- Track gauge: 4 ft 8 1/2 in (1,435 mm) standard gauge
- Length: 345 miles (555 km)

Other
- Website: Official website

The New England Central Railroad (reporting mark NECR) is a regional railroad in the New England region of the United States. It began operations in 1995, as the successor of the Central Vermont Railway (CV). The company was originally a subsidiary of holding company RailTex before being purchased by RailAmerica in 2000. In 2012, the company was purchased by Genesee & Wyoming, its current owner.

The New England Central Railroad main line runs from New London, Connecticut, to Alburgh, Vermont, at the Canada–US border, a distance of 366 miles (589 km). As of 2024, it has a total track length 345 miles (555 km). Primary sources of traffic include lumber, metals, chemicals, and crushed stone.

== History ==
=== Background and CN divestment ===
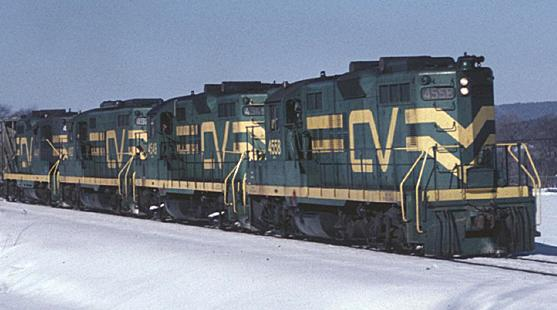
A Central Vermont Railway train in 1994

The Central Vermont Railway (CV) had long been owned and operated by Canadian railroads, first the Grand Trunk Railway and from 1927 the Canadian National Railway (CN); CN was in turn owned by the government of Canada. The Central Vermont's owners kept it a separate company, complete with its own fleet of green and yellow painted locomotives.

Operations on the line entered a general decline in the 1980s in tandem with falling freight volumes, which persisted despite the introduction of modern locomotives by CN in the early 1990s. In 1992, the Canadian government began the process of privatizing CN; as part of privatization, branches and less lucrative lines were identified for divestment, including the Central Vermont. CN announced it wished to sell the Central Vermont in 1993, and in October 1994 shortline railroad holding company RailTex Corp. offered to buy the CV via a new subsidiary named the New England Central Railroad (NECR). The transaction was completed in early 1995.

=== Formation and early years (1995–2000) ===
The Central Vermont Railway transitioned to the New England Central Railroad starting on February 3, 1995, with the transition completed three days later on February 6. The new railroad was marked by improved service compared to the old Central Vermont, as well as more flexible crew arrangements, both of which led to a resurgence of the line. Within a year of NECR's takeover of the line, declining traffic flow was reversed, with the railroad handling more than 30,000 carloads annually within two years of commencing operations, in contrast to the old CV, which had suffered through years of declining traffic and the loss of profitability. The company's rapid success led to it being named 1995's Short Line Railroad of the Year by industry trade journal Railway Age.

NECR's motive power initially consisted of former Gulf, Mobile and Ohio Railroad EMD GP38s, although by the late 1990s, leased locomotives, largely former Conrail EMD SD40-2s, entered service.

Shortly after NECR's founding, the state of Connecticut and the company worked to develop more business at the Port of New London, where the State Pier had recently collapsed. The railroad was commended by a local newspaper for "an aggressive effort to bring rail and shipping business through New London." The pier was rebuilt and opened in 1998, with NECR's tracks directly serving the port. The port's operator leased four acres from the railroad for cargo storage.

=== RailAmerica ownership (2000–2012) ===
In 2000, RailTex was acquired by RailAmerica, which was subsequently bought in 2007 by Fortress Investments. Neither change in ownership affected the NECR to any great extent.

On November 9, 2010, the railroad began construction on a project to raise speeds on trackage within Vermont to 59 miles per hour (95 km/h), with speeds on the route south of White River Junction being increased to 79 miles per hour (127 km/h) for passenger service. The upgrades were part of a project to decrease running times for Amtrak's Vermonter, which operates over the route. Construction was funded by a $70 million grant from the federal government, part of the American Recovery and Reinvestment Act.

The NECR main line was heavily damaged in several locations by Hurricane Irene during August 2011. A six mile segment in Vermont was taken out of service entirely by storm damage, with downed trees and flooding affecting other segments as well. Rail service returned to all customers by September 13, with full repairs completed later in the month.

=== Genesee & Wyoming ownership (2012–present) ===
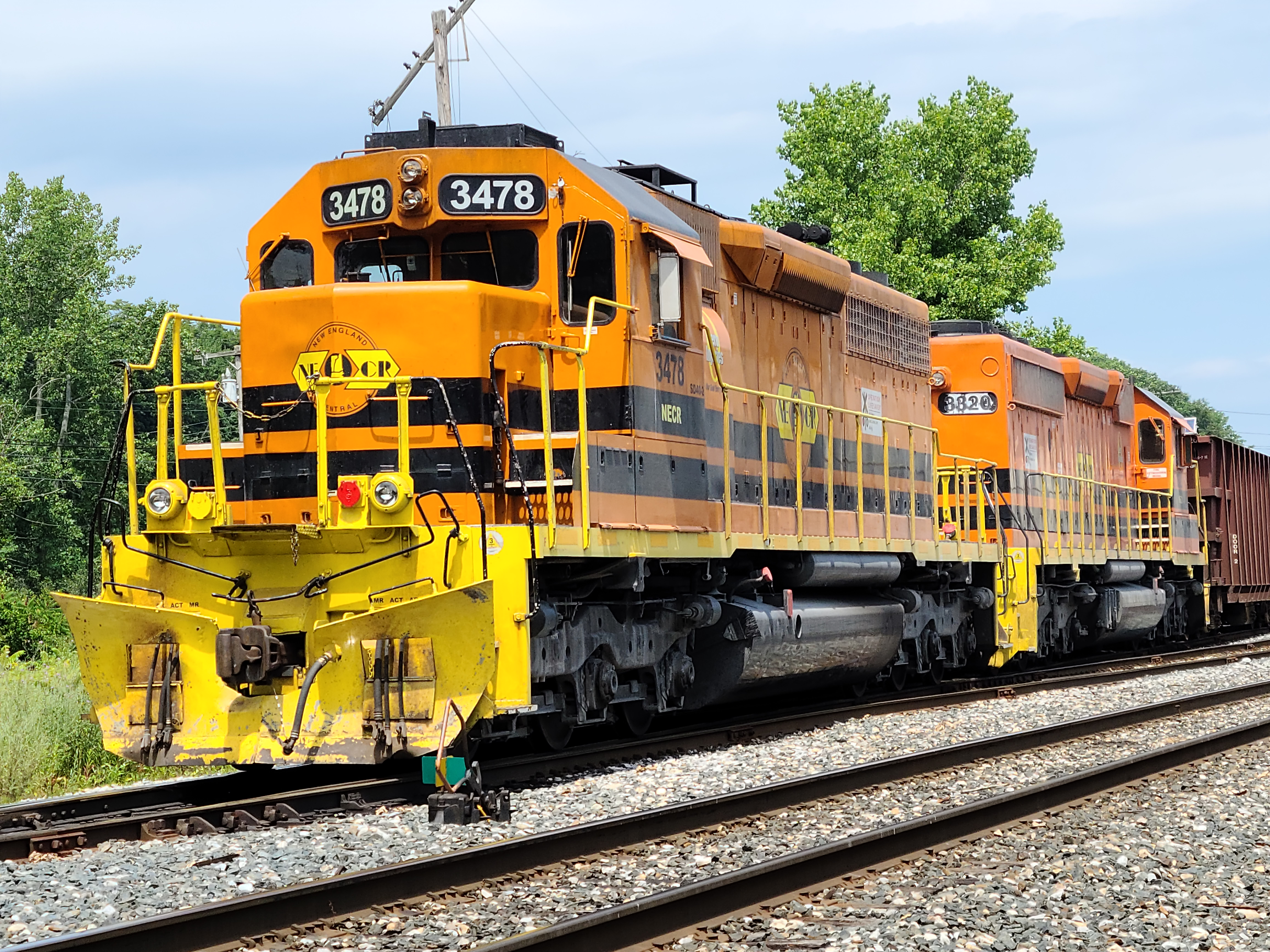
A NECR train parked in Brattleboro, Vermont

The 45 railroads formerly owned by RailAmerica, which had previously taken over RailTex lines, were transferred to Connecticut-based shortline holding company Genesee & Wyoming in December 2012. This change of ownership caused a shuffle of locomotives around their rail system, and the original NECR yellow-and-blue paint scheme is slowly being replaced by the Genesee & Wyoming scheme. Genesee & Wyoming subsequently purchased the Providence and Worcester Railroad, which interchanges freight with the New England Central, in 2016.

NECR purchased the shortline Claremont-Concord Railroad in 2015, adding the latter's line in Claremont and its freight rights on a state-owned line in Lebanon, New Hampshire.

== Operations ==
=== System ===
New England Central's main line connects the Long Island Sound port of New London, Connecticut, to the Canadian border in East Alburgh, Vermont. The company's line connects St. Albans, Essex Junction, Montpelier, White River Junction, and Brattleboro within Vermont. Branches connect Essex Junction to Burlington and White River Junction to Lebanon, New Hampshire, and a third branch exists in Claremont, New Hampshire (formerly the Claremont-Concord Railroad). Within Massachusetts, the NECR mainline passes through Millers Falls and the important junction at Palmer. In Connecticut, the line serves Stafford Springs, Willimantic, and Norwich before terminating at the Port of New London.

=== Train operations ===
From the Canadian border, several mainline trains move traffic along the system. Trains 323 (northbound) and 324 (southbound) operate between St. Albans (connecting with Canadian National trains from Montreal) and Brattleboro, making stops to pick up or drop cars at junctions as needed. Train 611 hauls mainline traffic between Brattleboro and Palmer. South of Palmer, train 608 operates south to Willimantic and back, while train 610 covers the line between Willimantic and New London. Local trains are based in St. Albans, White River Junction, and Palmer, serving customers in those areas or performing switching at NECR yards.

Besides the CN interchange in St. Albans, NECR interchanges with Vermont Railway (plus Canadian Pacific Railway through a haulage agreement) and its subsidiaries Green Mountain Railroad and Washington County Railroad in Vermont and New Hampshire, with CSX Transportation and the Massachusetts Central Railroad in Palmer, with Pan Am Southern in Brattleboro and Millers Falls, and with the Providence and Worcester Railroad in Willimantic and New London.

=== Traffic ===
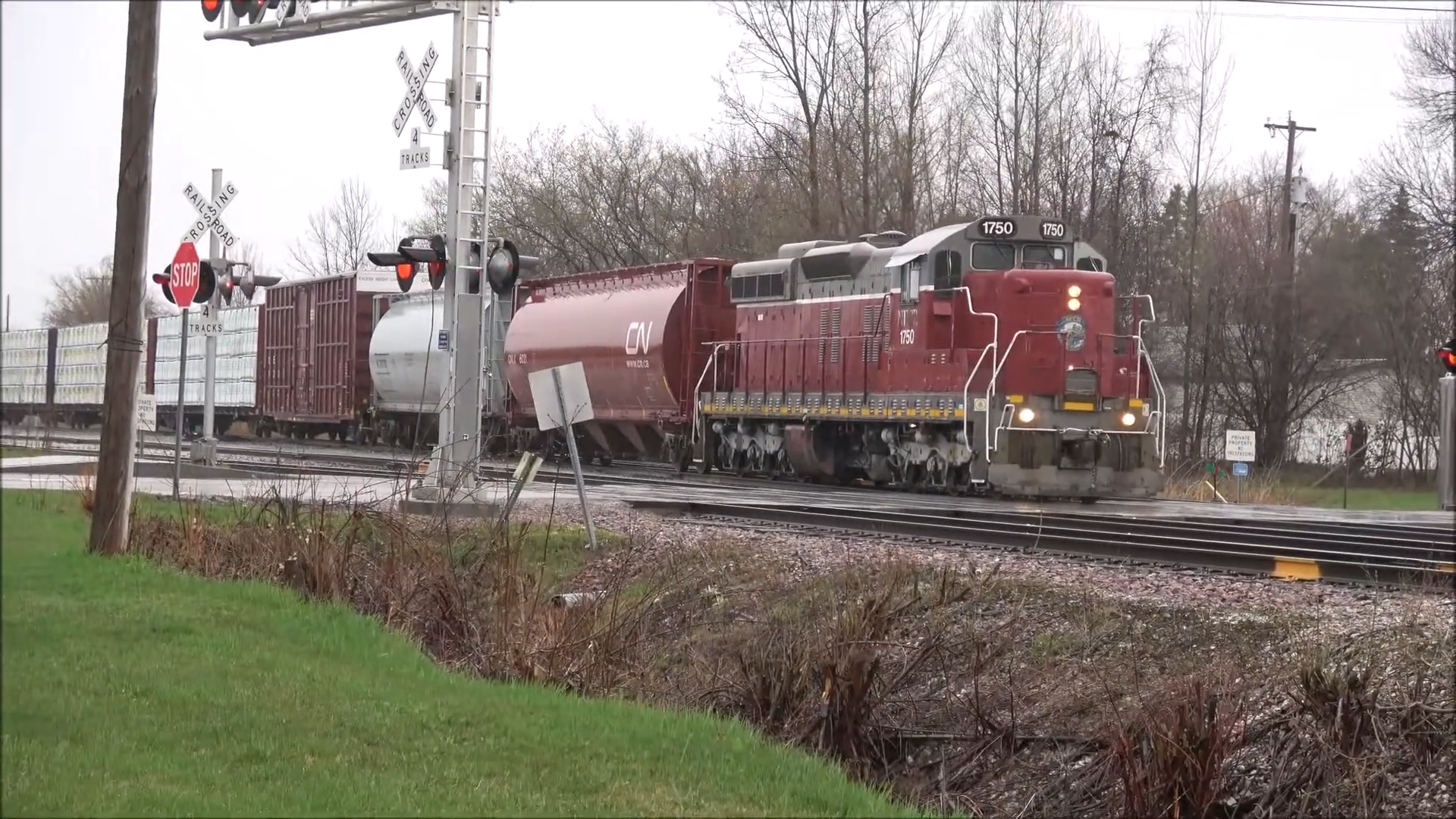
NECR 1750, an EMD SD9 in NECR colors at St. Albans, Vermont on April 27, 2019

The railroad's traffic consists largely of general freight, including lumber products, metals, chemicals and stone products, although COFC (container on flat car) and TOFC (trailer on flat car) business is also operated from the Canada–US border to Boston, in partnership with the Providence and Worcester Railroad. The NECR hauled around 37,000 carloads in 2008.

=== Facilities ===
NECR maintains significant operations at several locations along their line. Its main office is located in St. Albans, Vermont, along with the main office for the Connecticut Southern Railroad (CSOR), with which NECR shares many management functions. St. Albans is also the location of the main shop and dispatch office. Vermont's largest rail yard is the St. Albans yard, which handles upwards of 40,000 cars each year. Other significant operations are at White River Junction and Brattleboro, both of which are the location of offices and smaller yards. Palmer, Massachusetts, serves as the main yard and office for operations south of the Vermont line.

=== Locomotives ===
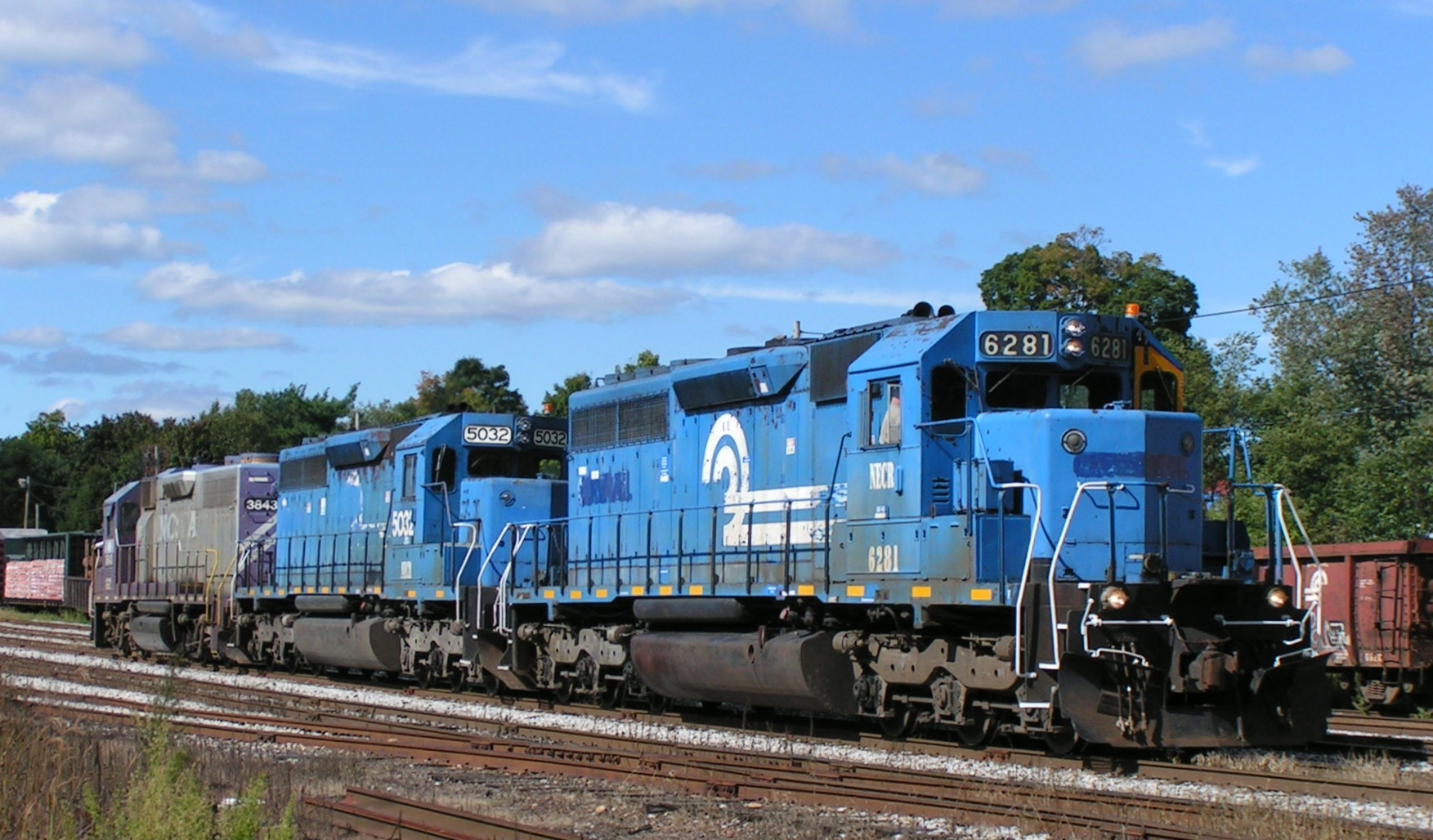
Several NECR SD40 locomotives, still wearing Conrail colors in 2007

The New England Central Railroad started operations with 12 GP38 locomotives, and exclusively operated Electro-Motive Diesel products from its founding until 2023. These were supplemented by a trio of SD40s acquired from Conrail during the 1990s. After RailAmerica took ownership of the NECR, a number of GP40-2L locomotives (the L indicating a wide Canadian safety cab) were added to the fleet, plus two SD9s of Duluth, Missabe and Iron Range Railway heritage.

When RailAmerica was placed under new ownership in 2007, more locomotives were transferred to NECR, including GP40-2s and six-axle SD40-2s. Additional SD40-2 and SD45 style locomotives from other railroads joined NECR's fleet by 2012. NECR also obtained a SD40T-2 (colloquially known as a tunnel motor) of Southern Pacific Railroad vintage in 2013. In 2023, NECR acquired 7 former CSX C40-8Ws, making them the first General Electric locomotives on their roster. As a Genesee & Wyoming subsidiary since 2012, NECR has sometimes shared locomotives with nearby G&W subsidiaries Connecticut Southern Railroad and Providence and Worcester Railroad (the latter purchased by G&W in 2016).

== Passenger services ==
Since 1995, Amtrak has operated its daily Vermonter service between Washington, D.C., and St. Albans, Vermont, using the NECR. Until 2014, the NECR was used north of Palmer, Massachusetts, and since 2014, north of Northfield, Massachusetts. With state and federal funding, Amtrak and the New England Central Railroad completed repairs and upgrades to much of the NECR mainline in Vermont in 2012, allowing the Vermonter to reach a maximum speed of 79 miles per hour (127 km/h). The Central Corridor Rail Line is a proposed passenger train service between New London and Brattleboro via the NECR main line.

Preceded by Central Vermont Railroad	Short Line Railroad of the Year; 1995	Succeeded by Philadelphia, Bethlehem and New England Railroad
