= North Wilbraham station =

North Wilbraham
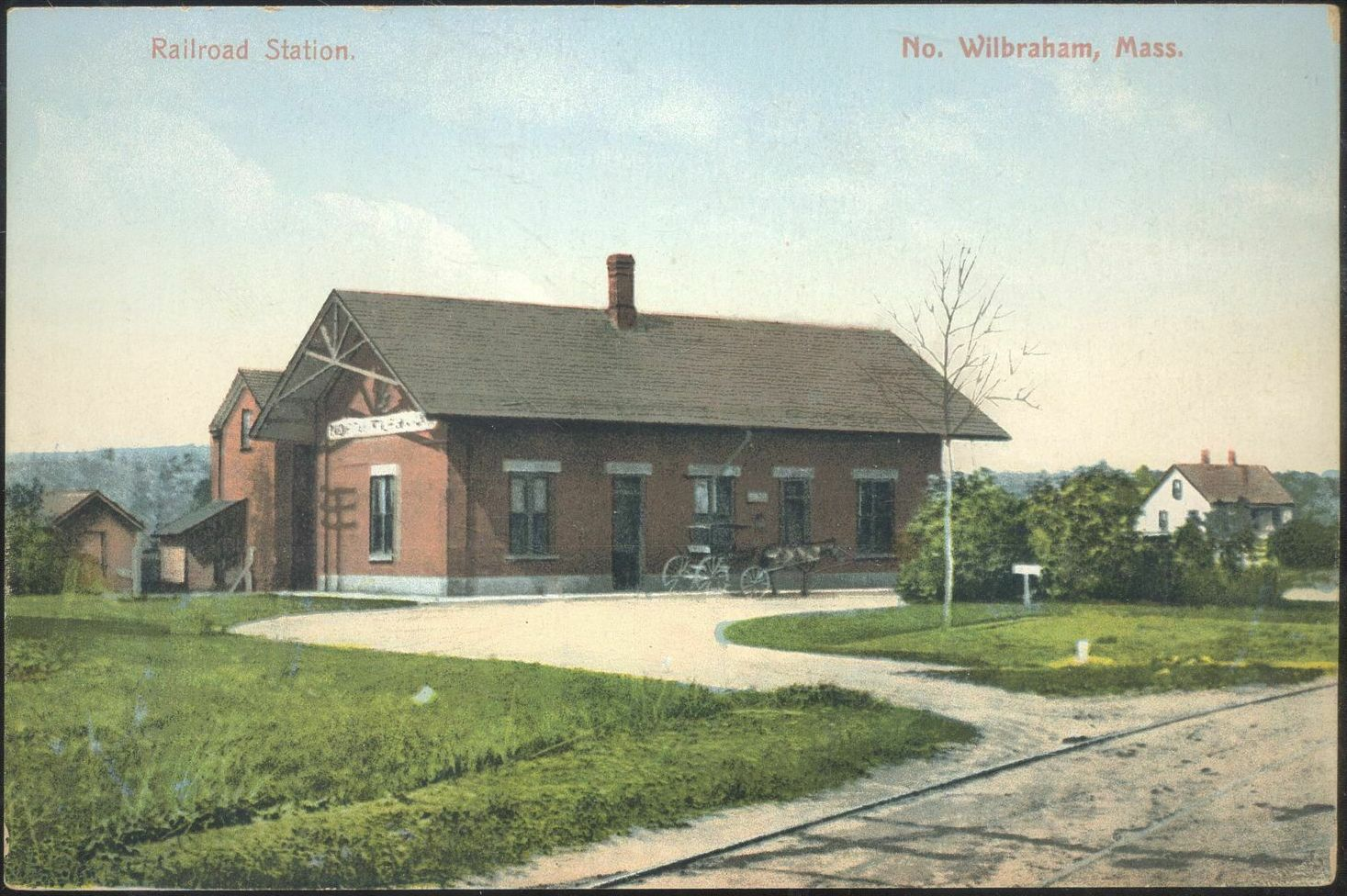
- Early postcard of North Wilbraham station

General information
- Coordinates: 42°9′14.54″N 72°25′22.01″W

Former services
Preceding station	New York Central Railroad	Following station
Springfield, MA toward Albany	Boston and Albany Railroad Main Line	Palmer toward Boston
Location

North Wilbraham station was located on Old Boston Post Road at Chapel Street in North Wilbraham, Massachusetts. The Western Railroad opened through Wilbraham in October 1839; it later became part of the Boston and Albany Railroad. Service to North Wilbraham and other intermediate stations on the line ended before 1960, through Amtrak's Lake Shore Limited still operates over the tracks.
