= East Alburgh, Vermont =

East Alburgh
- Interactive map of East Alburgh
- Coordinates: 44°58′23″N 73°13′46″W
- Country: United States
- State: Vermont
- County: Grand Isle County
- Elevation: 33 m (108 ft)

East Alburgh (also known as East Alburg and Alburg Junction) is a populated place in Grand Isle County in the U.S. state of Vermont. It was formerly the location of the interchange between New England Central Railroad and Canadian National.

== See also ==
- Alburgh (town), Vermont
- Alburgh (village), Vermont
