= Massachusetts Central Railroad =

Shortline railroad in Massachusetts

Massachusetts Central Railroad Corp.

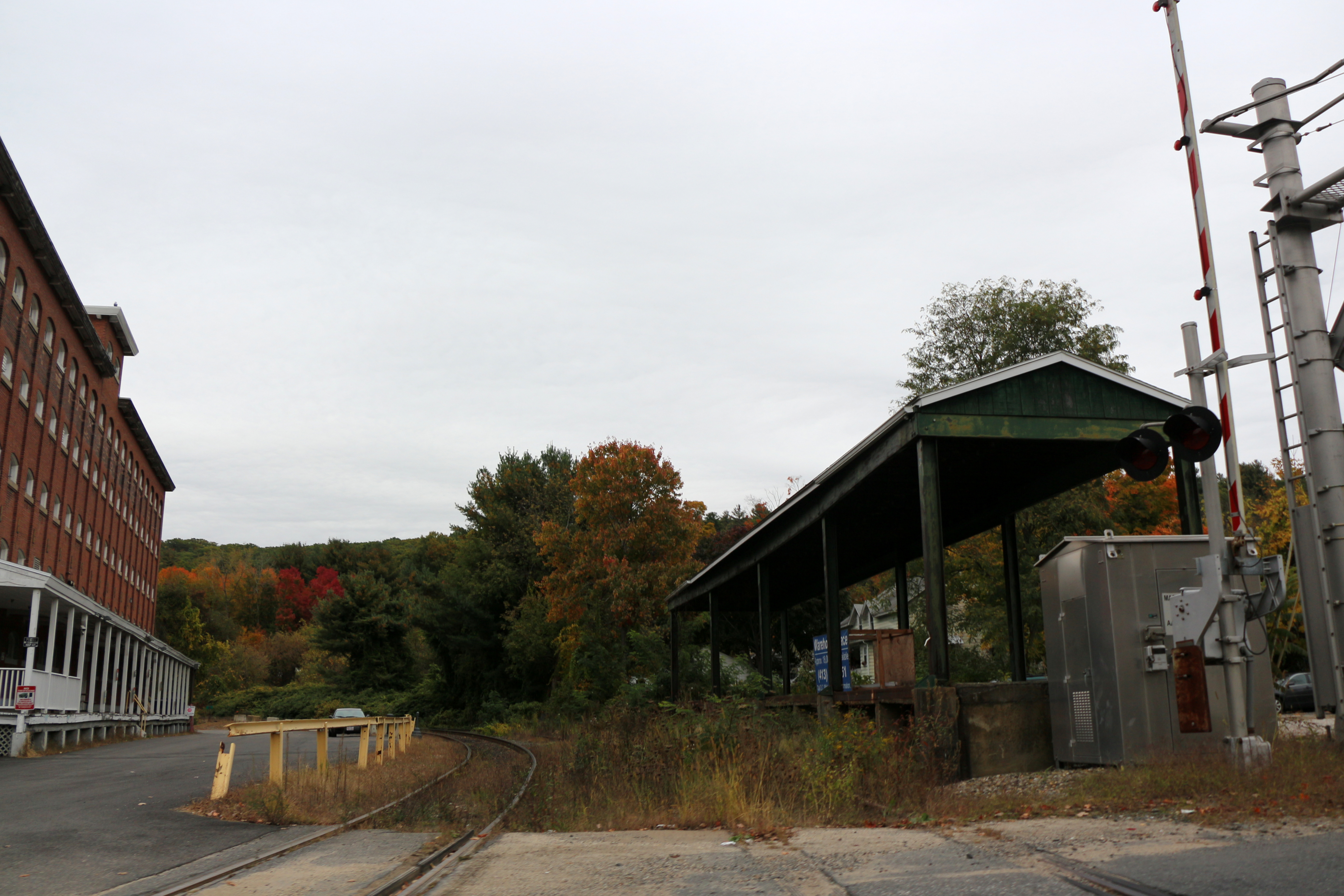
- Massachusetts Central Railroad tracks in Palmer, Massachusetts

Overview
- Headquarters: South Barre, Massachusetts
- Reporting mark: MCER
- Locale: Massachusetts
- Dates of operation: 1975 (Incorporated 1974)–
- Predecessor: B&M Wheelwright Branch & the PC Ware River Line

Technical
- Track gauge: 4 ft 8 1/2 in (1,435 mm) standard gauge

The Massachusetts Central Railroad (reporting mark MCER) is a short line railroad in western Massachusetts, United States. It was established in 1975 to provide railroad transportation services on portions of the Boston & Maine Wheelwright Branch in and around their trackage in Bondsville (a village of Palmer) and Ware, and later between Palmer and South Barre on the old right-of-way of the Ware River Railroad.

== History ==
The Ware River Railroad was an independent line that ran from Palmer to the Cheshire Railroad in Winchendon. It was built in 1868. The first section, from Palmer to Gilbertville, opened in 1870, and the rest three years later. Until 1873 it was leased to and operated by the New London Northern Railroad.

It was eventually taken over by the Boston and Albany Railroad and run as its Winchendon Branch. The B&A wanted to run the Ware River Line in conjunction with the Monadnock Railroad in order to gain access to the resort areas of Peterborough, New Hampshire. When the B&A failed to gain control of the Monadnock, the Ware River Line was not very profitable.

By 1968, the line came under the control of the Penn Central, and tracks were abandoned between South Barre and Waterville, splitting the line in two. The Boston and Maine Railroad took over the line from Waterville to Winchendon and operated it until it was abandoned in 1984. Penn Central continued to operate the line south of Barre, but in 1975 all services between Gilbertville and South Barre were discontinued. Conrail operated the line between Palmer and Ware and applied for abandonment of the remainder of the line.

== Massachusetts ownership ==
The Commonwealth of Massachusetts acquired most of the line in 1978, except a few miles in Palmer to the Palmer Depot and the B&A main line. The State contracted out the continued service to the newly formed Consolidated Rail Corp. (Conrail).

By 1975, the MCER, or as it later became known—the MassCentral. It was formed by three individuals from Western Massachusetts and started limited operations on a few miles of the Boston & Maine trackage in and around the Ware Yard. After a year of Conrail operations on the State-owned line, the contract was awarded to MassCentral. The train rarely ran north of Ware until 1999 when a new rail customer, a "reload", justified restored freight service to South Barre. The Commonwealth currently owns approximately 24 miles of mainline connecting the various yard trackage owned by MCER at Palmer, Gibbs Crossing, Ware and South Barre.

Service to half a dozen customers from Palmer Village up to the Reload at South Barre continues to the present, five days a week from its interchange with CSX and NECR (New England Central). From the former Intermodal Yard around milepost one next to the ex Central Vermont Railroad main line (1 customer), with other customers located at the Gibbs Crossing Transload Yard (3); in and around Ware Yard (4); and at the "Wildwood Reload" at South Barre (1), where numerous customers are provided rail to truck services, including warehousing and transloading by the reload. Principle commodities are plastics, construction and demolition debris, edible oils, waste oil, dimensional lumber, plywood, pipe, and paper.

The Massachusetts Central Railroad was acquired by Regional Rail, LLC in August 2026.
