= Boston Subdivision =

Railway line in Massachusetts

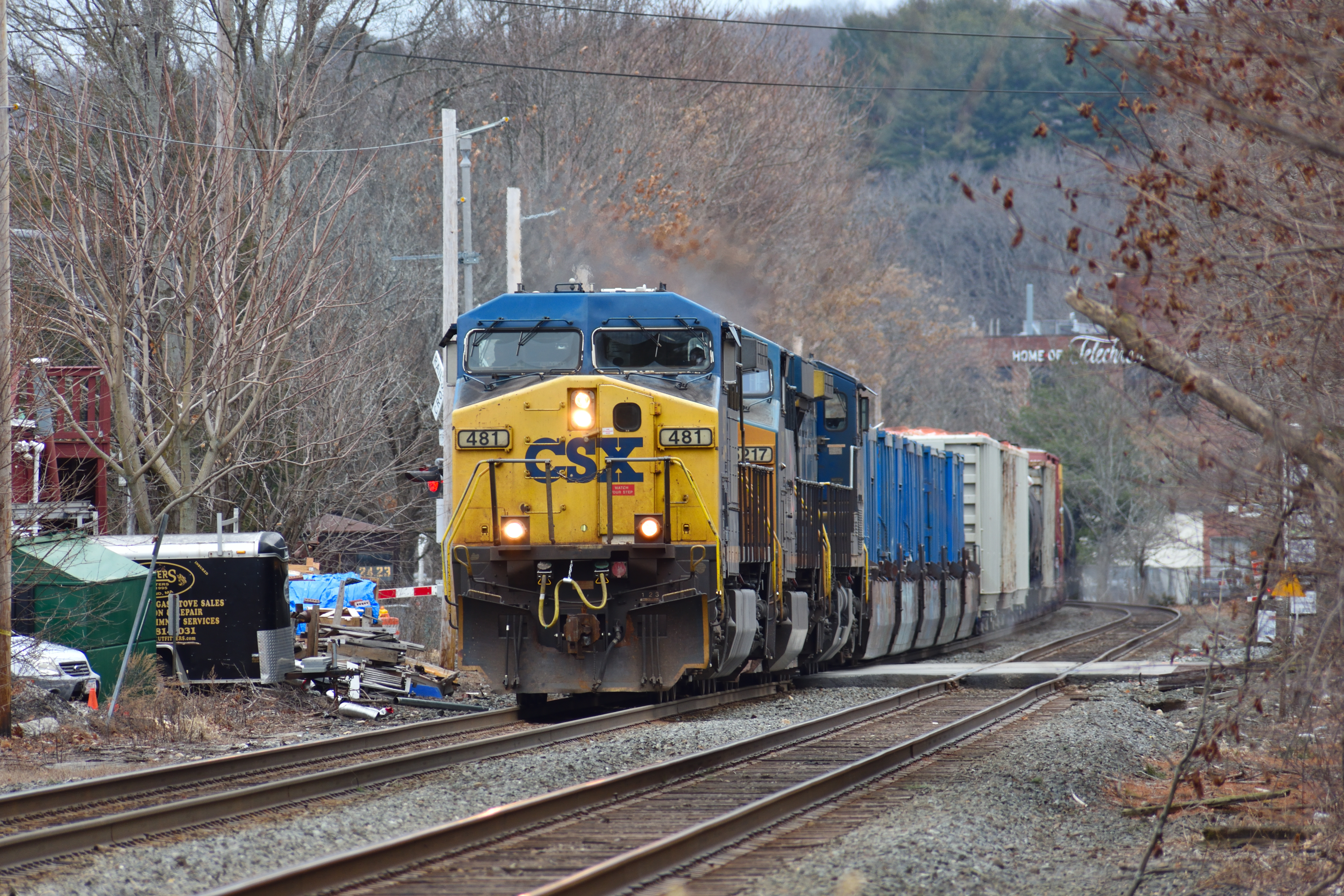
A CSX freight train in Ashland, Massachusetts, on the Boston Subdivision

The Boston Subdivision is a railroad line in the U.S. state of Massachusetts. The line runs from Back Bay Station in Boston west to Wilbraham, just east of Springfield. along a former New York Central Railroad line. The line connects with the Northeast Corridor at its east end and continues as the Berkshire Subdivision at its west end. Along the way, the line junctions with the Framingham Subdivision and Fitchburg Subdivision at Framingham.

The line is owned by multiple agencies. The line from Back Bay to Riverside as well as from Framingham station to Worcester Union Station is owned by the Massachusetts Department of Transportation, while the segment between Riverside and Framingham is owned by the Massachusetts Bay Transportation Authority. West of Worcester Union Station to Wilbraham, the line is owned by CSX Transportation, who has trackage rights over the entire line to reach the Dorchester Branch in Boston. MBTA Commuter Rail Framingham/Worcester Line trains operate over the line east of Worcester, where it is also called the MBTA Worcester Main Line, while Amtrak's Lake Shore Limited uses the entire line.

== History ==
The line originally had four tracks to Riverside station (two curved to the south and are currently used by the MBTA's Green Line D branch light rail service). The number of tracks running into downtown Boston was reduced to two in the 1950s, in order to build the Massachusetts Turnpike, which parallels the easternmost ten miles of trackage, although CSX retains the original Boston and Albany Railroad trackage rights.

The Boston and Worcester Railroad opened its line from Boston west to Worcester in 1834 and 1835. The Western Railroad opened from Worcester west to Springfield in 1839. The line became part of the Boston and Albany Railroad, New York Central, and Conrail through leases, mergers, and takeovers, and was assigned to CSX in the 1999 breakup of Conrail.

The state took over ownership of the line between Worcester and Boston in 2012, and took over dispatching in 2013.

== Freight ==
Major freight facilities served by the subdivision include intermodal container yards in Worcester and Springfield, a transload facility in Westboro, near I-495, and the Northeast Automotive Intermodal Gateway in East Brookfield.

== See also ==
- List of CSX Transportation lines
