= Millers Falls, Massachusetts =

- Census-designated place
- Bird's-eye view in 1907

- Location in Franklin County in Massachusetts
- Coordinates: 42°34′45″N 72°29′36″W
- Country: United States
- State: Massachusetts
- County: Franklin
- Towns: Montague, Erving

Area
  - Total: 0.96 sq mi (2.48 km^{2})
  - Land: 0.91 sq mi (2.36 km^{2})
  - Water: 0.046 sq mi (0.12 km^{2})
- Elevation: 295 ft (90 m)

Population (2020)
  - Total: 994
  - Density: 1,089.2/sq mi (420.56/km^{2})
- Time zone: UTC-5 (Eastern (EST))
  - Summer (DST): UTC-4 (EDT)
- ZIP Codes: 01349 (Millers Falls); 01344 (Erving)
- Area code: 413
- FIPS code: 25-41410
- GNIS feature ID: 0609184

Millers Falls is a census-designated place (CDP) in the towns of Montague and Erving in Franklin County, Massachusetts, United States. As of the 2020 census, Millers Falls had a population of 994. It is part of the Springfield, Massachusetts metropolitan statistical area.

== History ==
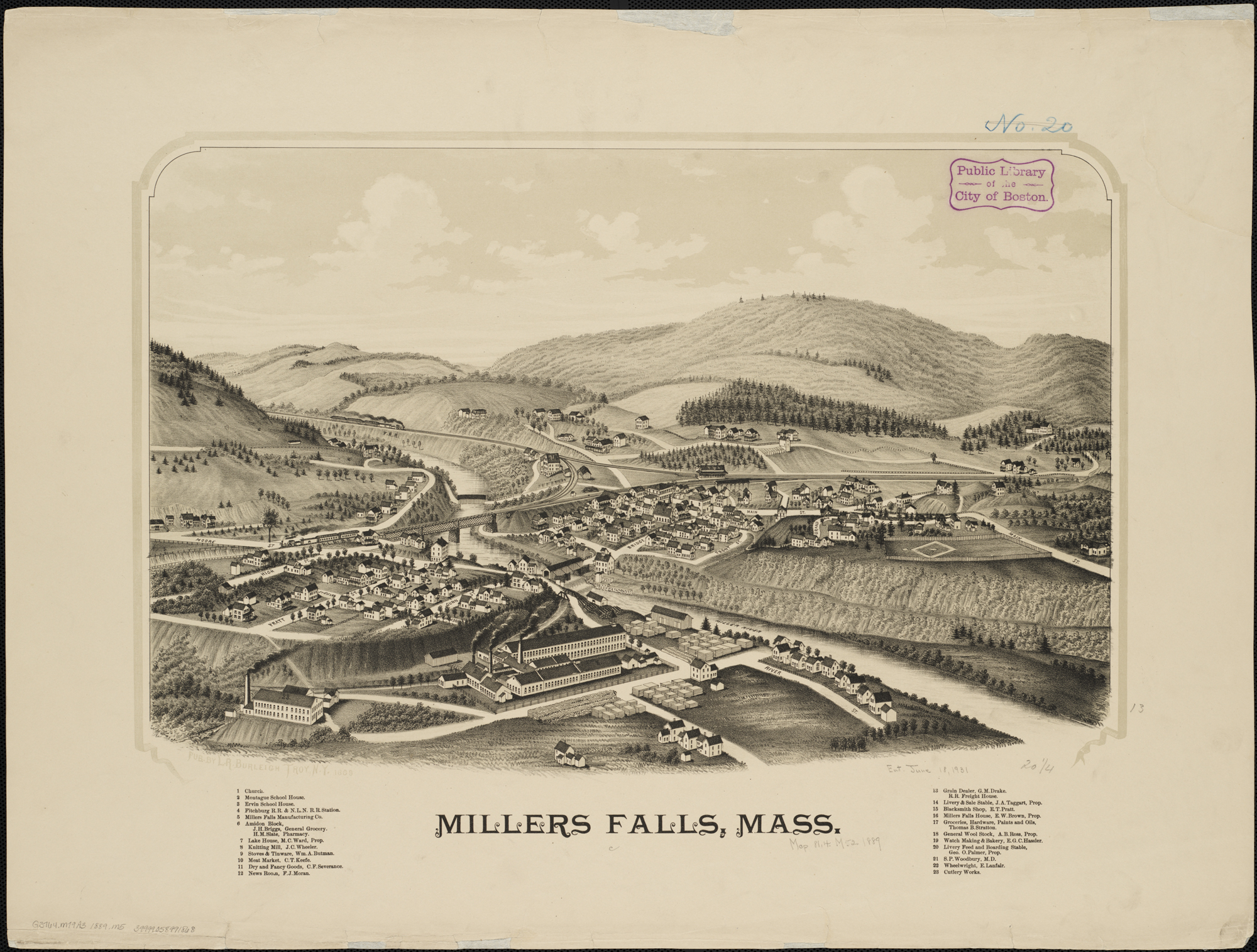
Lithograph of Miller's Falls from 1889 by L.R. Burleigh with list of landmarks

Located along the Mohawk Trail, Millers Falls was first established in 1824 as an agricultural community, named Grout's Corner after first settler Martin Grout (1790–1865). In the 1860s, however, the local growth of railroads stimulated development, as the New London Northern Railroad bought the Amherst & Palmer railroad in 1864 and in 1866 extended its line to a connection with the Vermont & Massachusetts at Grout's Corner. With this new railroad juncture, the abundant water power of the falls at Grout's Corner provided a perfect place to establish mills. The village's present name derives from the Millers Falls Manufacturing Company (later the Millers Falls Company), established on the Millers River in 1868, and famed for its fine hand tools.

The central portion of the village was listed on the National Register of Historic Places in 2021.

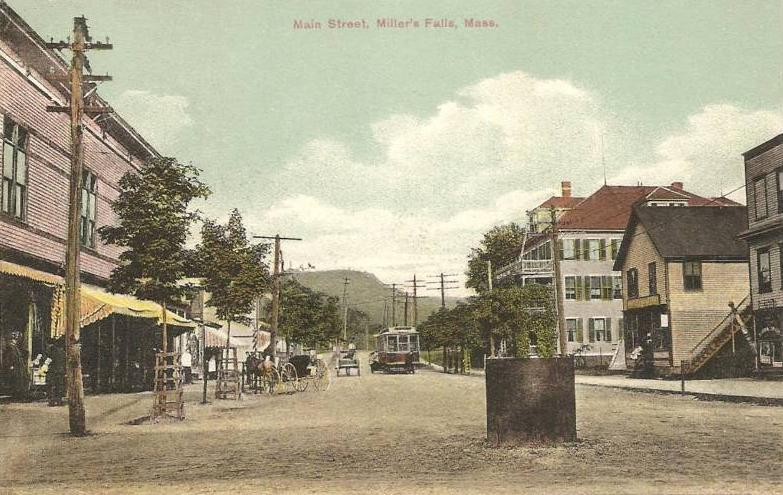
Main Street in 1910

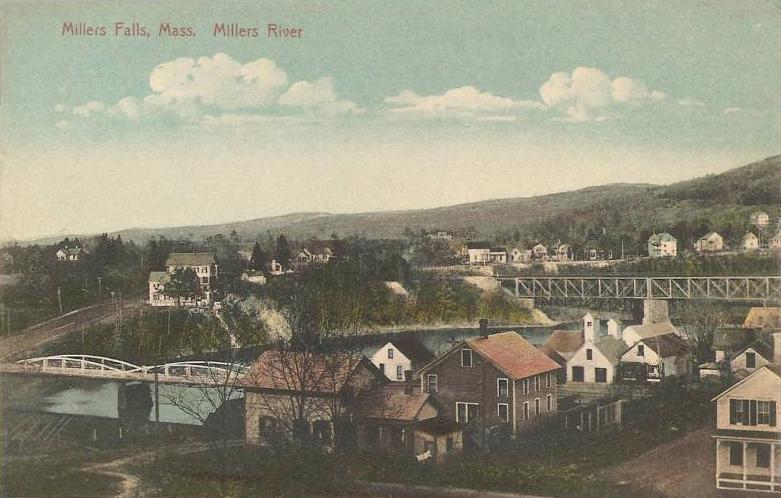
Millers River in 1912

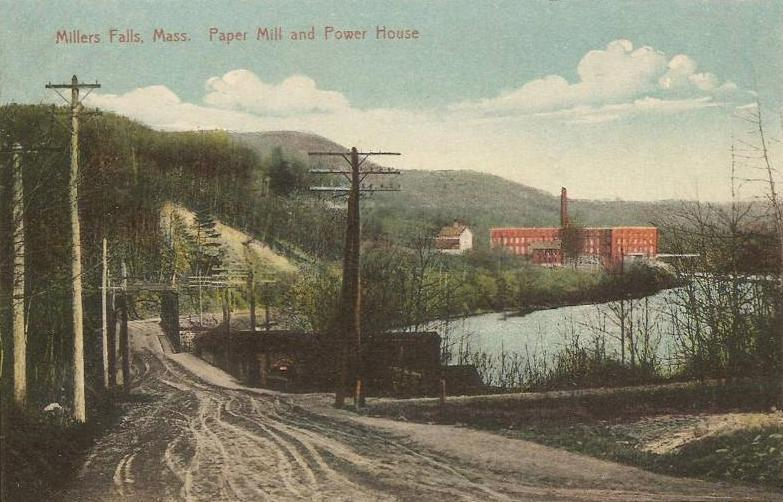
Paper mill in 1912

== Geography ==
Millers Falls is located at 42°34′45″N 72°29′36″W (42.579154, -72.493414), near the border with Erving, Massachusetts.

According to the United States Census Bureau, the CDP has a total area of 2.4 km^{2} (0.9 mi^{2}), of which 2.3 km^{2} (0.9 mi^{2}) is land and 0.1 km^{2} (0.04 mi^{2}) (3.26%) is water. The village is drained by the Millers River, a tributary of the Connecticut River.

Millers Falls is crossed by Massachusetts Routes 2 and 63.

== Demographics ==
Historical population
Census	Pop.	Note	%±
2020	994		—
U.S. Decennial Census

At the 2000 census there were 1,072 people, 439 households, and 273 families living in the CDP. The population density was 465.1/km^{2} (1,198.1/mi^{2}). There were 472 housing units at an average density of 204.8/km^{2} (527.5/mi^{2}). The racial makeup of the CDP was 96.18% White, 0.28% African American, 1.03% Native American, 0.37% Asian, 0.09% from other races, and 2.05% from two or more races. Hispanic or Latino of any race were 1.12%.

Of the 439 households 31.0% had children under the age of 18 living with them, 43.3% were married couples living together, 11.8% had a female householder with no husband present, and 37.8% were non-families. 27.3% of households were one person and 13.0% were one person aged 65 or older. The average household size was 2.44 and the average family size was 2.95.

The age distribution was 22.9% under the age of 18, 9.6% from 18 to 24, 34.7% from 25 to 44, 19.2% from 45 to 64, and 13.5% 65 or older. The median age was 35 years. For every 100 females, there were 100.0 males. For every 100 females age 18 and over, there were 97.6 males.

The median household income was $37,337 and the median family income was $41,711. Males had a median income of $34,886 versus $24,375 for females. The per capita income for the CDP was $17,768. About 1.8% of families and 4.8% of the population were below the poverty line, including 4.8% of those under age 18 and 9.0% of those age 65 or over.
