= Wellesley station (disambiguation) =

Wellesley station may refer to:

- Wellesley station, a subway station in Toronto, Canada
- Stations in Wellesley, Massachusetts, US:
  - Wellesley Farms station
  - Wellesley Hills station
  - Wellesley Square station, formerly known as Wellesley station
- Wellesley Road tram stop in Croydon, London
- Te Waihorotiu railway station, also called Wellesley St station, in Auckland, New Zealand
