= Natick Center station =

Train station in Natick, Massachusetts, US

Natick Center
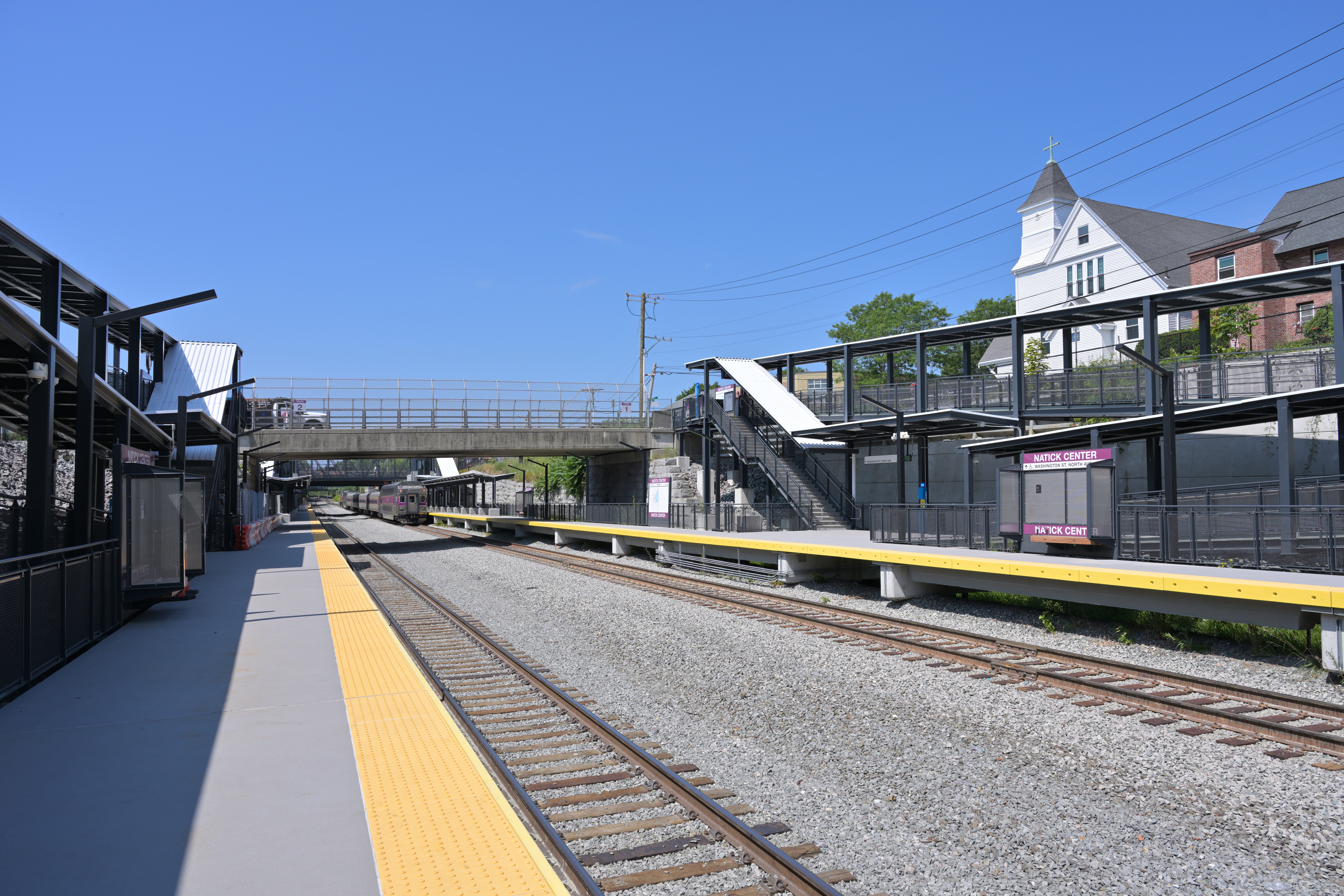
- Natick Center in August 2025

General information
- Location: 1 Walnut Street; Natick, Massachusetts, US
- Coordinates: 42.2858°N 71.3472°W
- Line: Worcester Main Line
- Platforms: 2 side platforms
- Tracks: 2
- Connections: MWRTA: 10, 11, Natick Commuter Shuttle, MathWorks Express Shuttle

Construction
- Parking: 71 spaces
- Accessible: Yes

Other information
- Fare zone: 4

History
- Opened: c. 1834–1838
- Rebuilt: 1845, 1875, 1897, 1962, c. 1982, 2020–2025
- Former names: Natick (until January 12, 2015)

Passengers
- 2024: 419 daily boardings

Services
Preceding station	MBTA	Following station
West Natick toward Worcester	Framingham/Worcester Line	Wellesley Square toward South Station
Former services
Preceding station	New York Central Railroad	Following station
Framingham toward Worcester	Worcester Line	Wellesley toward Boston
Felchville toward Saxonville	Saxonville Branch	Terminus
Location

Natick Center station is an MBTA Commuter Rail station in Natick, Massachusetts, United States. Served by the Framingham/Worcester Line, it is located below grade in an open cut. The accessible station has two side platforms flanking the two tracks of the Worcester Main Line, with entrances from North Main Street (Route 27) and Washington Street.

The Boston and Worcester Railroad (B&W) opened through Natick in 1834; a station was established by 1838 and modified around 1845. The Saxonville Branch opened between Natick and Saxonville in 1846. Around 1875, the Boston and Albany Railroad (B&A) built a new station slightly east. In 1895–1896, the railroad lowered the tracks through Natick to eliminate grade crossings. A new station building designed by Alexander Wadsworth Longfellow Jr. was completed in 1897.

B&A passenger service peaked in the early 1910s and declined thereafter. Saxonville Branch passenger service ended in 1936. Natick station was briefly closed in 1960 as part of service cuts. In 1962, a commercial building was built over the station building. The Massachusetts Bay Transportation Authority (MBTA) was formed in 1964 and began subsidizing service on the line in 1973. New platforms were paved around 1982.

The station was renamed Natick Center in 2015. Construction on a $36.1 million renovation of the station began in March 2020. Portions of the new accessible platforms opened in July 2025, with some construction still ongoing.

== Station layout ==
The Worcester Main Line runs approximately east-west in a trench through downtown Natick. It has two tracks with space reserved between for a future third track. The accessible station has two 800-foot (240 m)-long side platforms flanking the tracks. A footbridge crosses over the trench at Walnut Street, near the midpoint of the platforms, with an elevator and stairs to each platform. At the east end of the platforms, switchback ramps and stairs lead to the Washington Street bridge. The Cochituate Rail Trail connects to the west end of the outbound (north) platform with stairs to North Main Street. A 71-space town-owned parking lot for permit holders is located at Mulligan Street several blocks east of the station.

== History ==
=== Early history ===
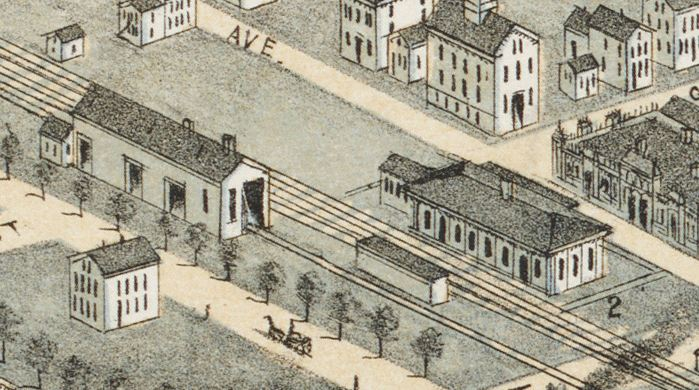
The freight house (left) and 1870s-built station on an 1877 aerial map

The Boston and Worcester Railroad (B&W) was built westward from Boston to Worcester, opening in stages from 1834 to 1835. The section from North Needham through Natick to Unionville opened on September 22, 1834. A station building "of the smallest size" was established by 1838 in Natick Center, one of several villages in the town. The addition of the railroad contributed to the rapid growth of Natick Center; it soon replaced South Natick as the town's commercial center.

The line was originally single track; construction of double track took place from 1839 to 1843. Improvements to Natick station were made around 1845. The 3.87-mile (6.23 km) Saxonville Branch opened from Natick to the Saxonville section of Framingham on July 4, 1846, with through trains to Boston. Although branch ridership was never high, these trains were the first time that commuting was possible on the B&W from west of West Newton.

The B&W merged with the Western Railroad in 1867 to form the Boston and Albany Railroad (B&A). By that time, the station was located on the south side of the tracks at Washington Street. In May 1869, the state legislature passed a bill authorizing the Middlesex County commissioners to decide whether to open Washington Street across the tracks – either as a bridge or a grade crossing – and requiring the B&A to relocate the station should the commissioners order.

On January 13, 1874, a fire destroyed much of downtown Natick. The town desired to extend Washington Street across the tracks during reconstruction; the railroad proposed a footbridge instead. That June, the legislature ordered the B&A to move the station 100–150 feet (30–46 m) east and construct the grade crossing. The old station was removed and the crossing opened by early November. The new station, a one-story wooden structure near Clarendon Street, was completed by late 1875. By that time, a wooden freight house was also present on the north side of the tracks at Franklin Street.

=== Grade crossing elimination ===
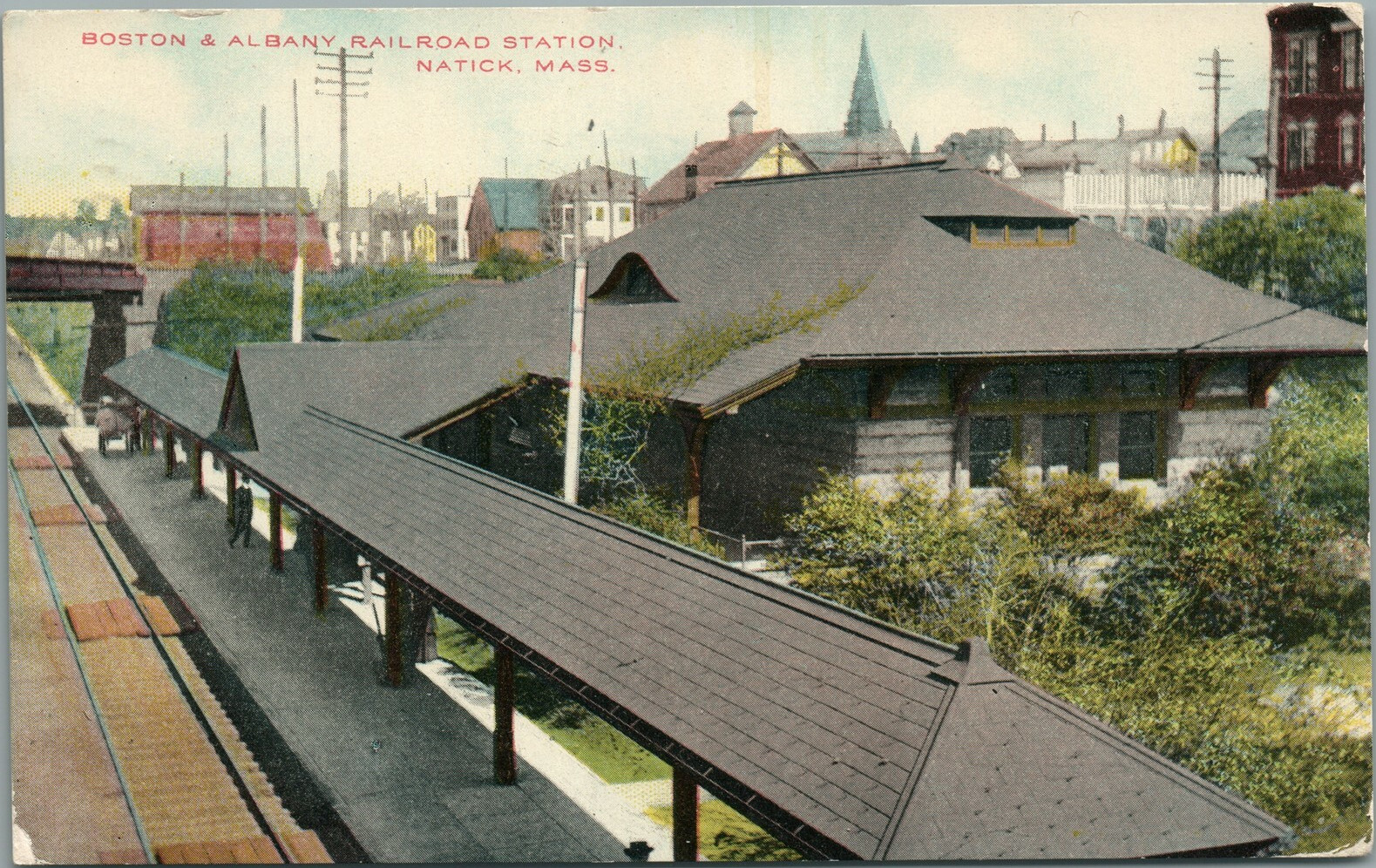
Postcard of the 1897-built station

Around 1883, the B&A began planning to eliminate the numerous grade crossings on its main line. The legislature authorized the B&A in 1887 to relocate its tracks slightly to the north through downtown Natick. In 1890, the Massachusetts General Court passed An Act to Promote the Abolition of Grade Crossings, which allowed town officials or a railroad company to petition the state superior court to create an independent commission to determine whether a grade crossing could and should be eliminated. The costs of such eliminations were to be paid 65% by the railroad, not more than 10% by the town, and the remainder by the state. The rate of grade crossing eliminations increased after its passage.

The town of Natick and the B&A jointly petitioned for a commission around 1894. The B&A presented plans to the commission in December 1894. They called for the main line and Saxonville Branch to be lowered below grade, with a maximum lowering of 15 feet (4.6 m) at Main Street. The main line would be located northwards at a slight angle to the existing line – a distance of 59 feet (18 m) at Washington Street and 224 feet (68 m) at Washington Avenue. It would extend into the southern portion of Lake Cochituate, with the lake filled south of the new alignment. Five bridges were to be built over the main line and one over the Saxonville Branch.

The Massachusetts Board of Railroad Commissioners approved the plan in May 1895. By mid-1896, the project was nearly complete at a cost of $389,238 (equivalent to $12.6 million in 2024). The B&A also opened a new passenger station in 1897. Made of granite with brownstone trim, it was located on the south side of the tracks between Walnut Street and Washington Street. A small baggage room was located just to the east. Wooden canopies were located on both sides of the tracks. The station was designed by Alexander Wadsworth Longfellow Jr., a student of H.H. Richardson, who had designed nine stations for the B&A in the 1880s. The old freight house was removed; a new freight house was built on the Saxonville Branch near Wilton Street.

Between 1899 and 1904, the old station building was removed, while Middlesex Avenue was built on part of the old alignment. The New York Central Railroad acquired the B&A in 1900. There were initially three tracks at the station – the two-track main line and the single-track Saxonville Branch. In 1907, the B&A extended third and fourth tracks from Lake Crossing (at the Wellesley/Natick border) to Framingham. At Natick station, the line had four mainline tracks plus the branch track.

=== 20th century ===
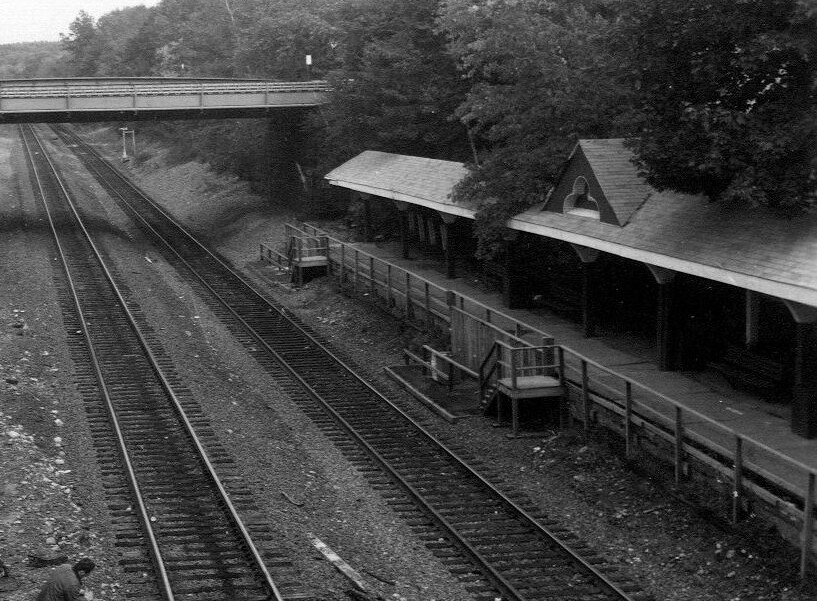
Natick station in October 1981

Service on the B&A system peaked in the early 1910s. In 1913, Natick was served by 23 daily round trips, including two Saxonville–Boston round trips. Service cutbacks began during the middle of the decade. The lightly used Saxonville Branch was reduced to one daily round trip by 1919. All passenger service on the branch was discontinued effective February 17, 1936. A "bus" – the Saxonville station agent's car – ran to Saxonville until 1943. The B&A made major cuts to passenger service in the late 1930s and after World War II; main line service to Natick consisted of 21 daily round trips in 1938 and 11 in 1954. One main track was removed west of Riverside in 1952.

The B&A intended to end all Boston commuter service when the conversion of the Highland branch into a streetcar line was completed in 1959. The railroad was allowed to discontinue most service effective April 1, 1960; the only remaining commuter service consisted of four daily round trips. Natick station, which was used by 157 daily passengers, was closed entirely. The station reopened in early May as part of the settlement of a lawsuit by four cities against the B&A. In 1961, the B&A was merged into the New York Central. The line was reduced to two tracks between Boston and Worcester in 1962. Around that time, a commercial building was built over the 1897-constructed station, with the station becoming the basement of a liquor store. The inbound (south) canopy remained for passenger use.

The Massachusetts Bay Transportation Authority (MBTA) was formed in August 1964 to subsidize suburban commuter rail service. The New York Central merged into Penn Central in 1968. On January 1, 1973, the MBTA began subsidizing the three remaining daily round trips on the line. Later that month, the MBTA acquired most of Penn Central's suburban lines around Boston, including the Riverside–Framingham section of the B&A main line. Penn Central, which merged into Conrail in 1976, continued to operate freight on the main line and the Saxonville Branch. The station had 77 daily boardings in 1974. The MBTA began increasing service on the line (now the Framingham/Worcester Line) in the late 1970s; by 1983, the station had 12 daily round trips and 319 daily boardings.

MBTA track upgrades in 1980 lowered the south track by several feet through Natick; passengers used wooden staircases from the old platform to small boarding platforms. In October 1981, the MBTA awarded a contract to add paved station platforms on the line. Platforms were built on both sides of the tracks at Natick. A second station serving the town – West Natick – opened in 1982 to provide additional parking. Freight service on the Saxonville Branch ended around 2006; the Cochituate Rail Trail was built on the right-of-way. In October 1997, Natick was identified as a possible site for a parking garage. The MBTA planned a three-story, 300-space garage on town-owned land. The plan was cancelled because of concerns over the financial viability of the garage.

=== Reconstruction ===
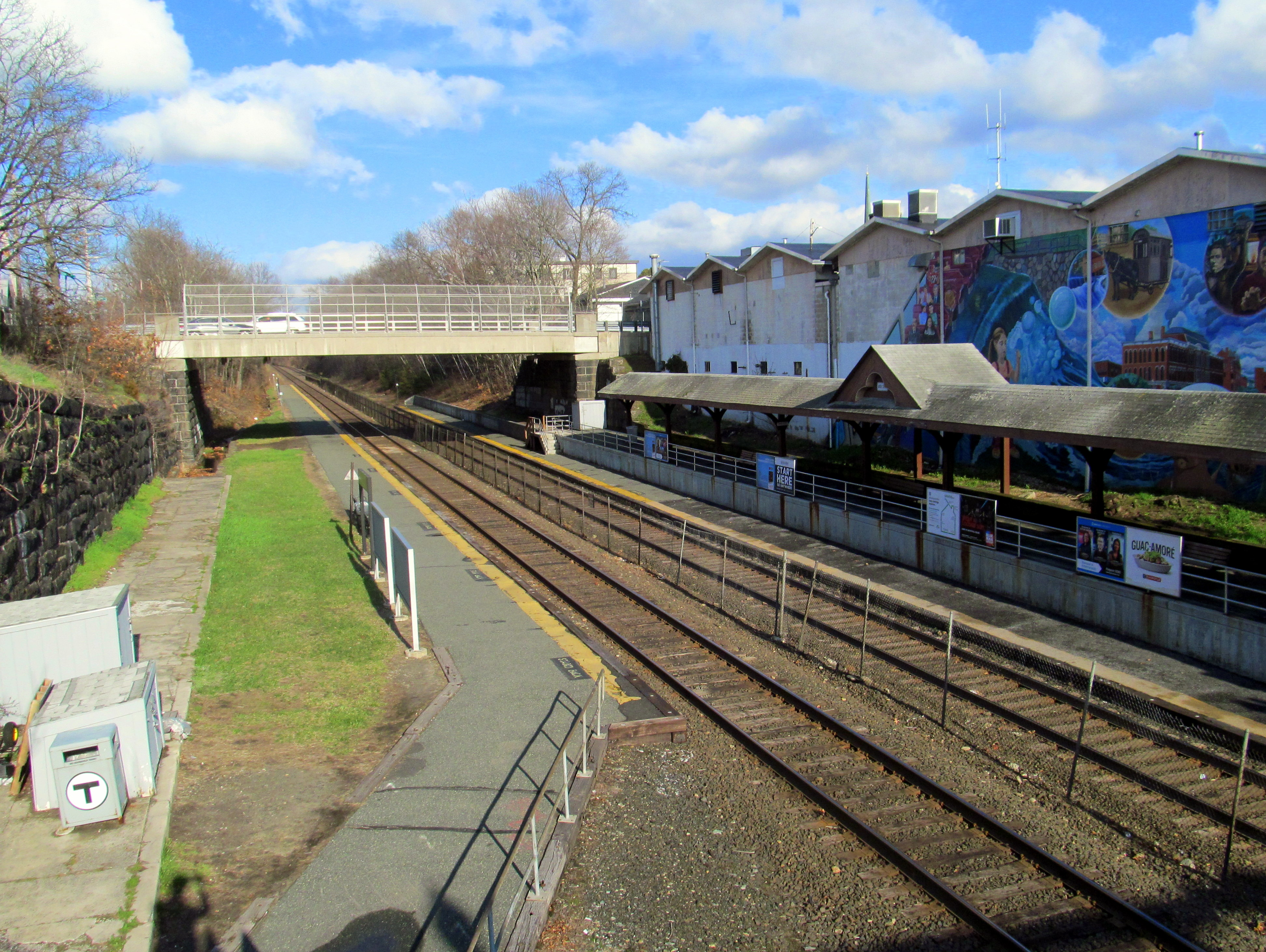
The non-accessible platforms in 2016 prior to reconstruction

The 1980s-built platforms at the station were not accessible; they did not have level boarding for train cars, and there were no ramps or elevators to street level. The station was also poorly integrated with the surrounding area; each platform only had a single narrow stairway, and there was insufficient space for bicycle parking, bus stops, and passenger pick-up/drop-off. Flooding of the inbound track and platform during heavy rains was a recurrent problem. The town appropriated $80,000 (equivalent to $112,000 in 2025) in 2012 for a feasibility study and conceptual design of a rebuilt station.

Conceptual plans for the reconstruction were presented in June 2014. The rebuilt station was to replace the existing side platforms with an accessible high-level island platform for cost and operational reasons, with a third track for freight trains and express passenger trains able to fit into the wide existing trench as well. The platform would be slightly west of the existing platforms, with entrances from Spring Street, Main Street, and Washington Street. The proposal would provide better integration of the station with the surrounding streets, including a plaza deck replacing the Walnut Street bridge. A rebuilt station with a pedestrian-only deck was projected to cost $26 million (equivalent to $34 million in 2024), while a deck incorporating a loop for MetroWest Regional Transit Authority buses would add $17 million ($22 million).

In July 2014, the MBTA agreed to the town's request to change the station's name to Natick Center as part of a larger rebranding of the downtown area. Online maps were changed shortly thereafter; the renaming became official on January 12, 2015. By early 2019, the island platform design was replaced with two side platforms. The platforms would be closer to their existing locations, with no entrance from Spring Street; a footbridge rather than a plaza would be located at Walnut Street. The third center track would not be added as part of initial construction, but space would be left between the two main tracks to add it in the future.

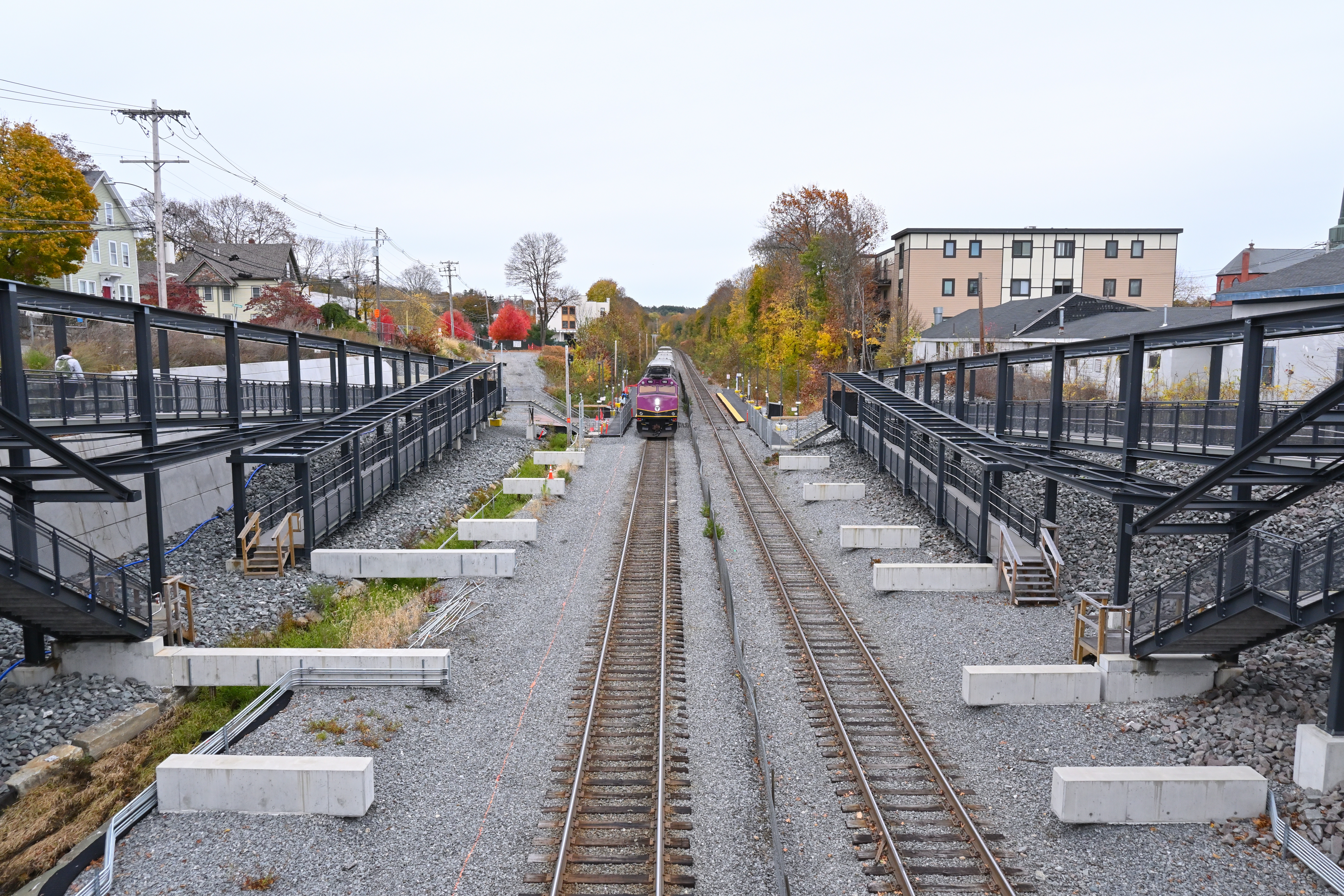
Construction work in November 2023, with the short temporary platforms in use

The construction contract was put out to bid in August 2019 with a cost estimated at $36.5 million (equivalent to $44 million in 2024). A $36.1 million contract (equivalent to $44 million in 2024) was awarded on November 4, 2019. Construction began in March 2020 with completion expected in September 2022. Demolition of the canopy took place in May 2020. A temporary platform on the south side was installed later in the year. In July 2020, the state awarded $125,000 (equivalent to $156,000 in 2025) for design of the final 1,300-foot (400 m) segment of the Cochituate Rail Trail, including the connection with the new station. Construction in 2021 included platform supports, drainage, and a retaining wall.

The MBTA issued a $28 million design contract (equivalent to $32 million in 2024) in June 2021 for a project to add a third track from Weston to Framingham, including through Natick Center. The track was projected to be complete in 2030. In February 2022, the MBTA indicated that completion would be delayed to early 2024 due to supply chain issues and soil conditions requiring modification of a retaining wall design. By December 2022, construction was 45% complete, with the east ramps nearly finished. By that time, expected completion was further delayed to fall 2024.

The east ramps were put into service on February 13, 2023, to access temporary platforms east of Washington Street, allowing the old platforms to be demolished and the new permanent platforms built. The Walnut Street footbridge was closed on March 2, 2023. By November 2023, construction was 70% complete and expected to finish in September 2024. By June 2024, work was still 70% complete, with completion expected in December 2024. By December 2024, work was 75% complete, with completion expected in May 2025. The eastern portion of the new accessible inbound platform, including the elevator, opened on July 21, 2025. The eastern portion of the outbound platform and its elevator opened on July 28. Construction continued on the west portions of the platforms. A ribbon-cutting ceremony was held on August 11. The western portion of the outbound platform opened on February 9, 2026, along with the connecting section of rail trail. The western portion of the inbound platform was expected to open that March.
