= Framingham/Worcester Line =

MBTA commuter railroad line

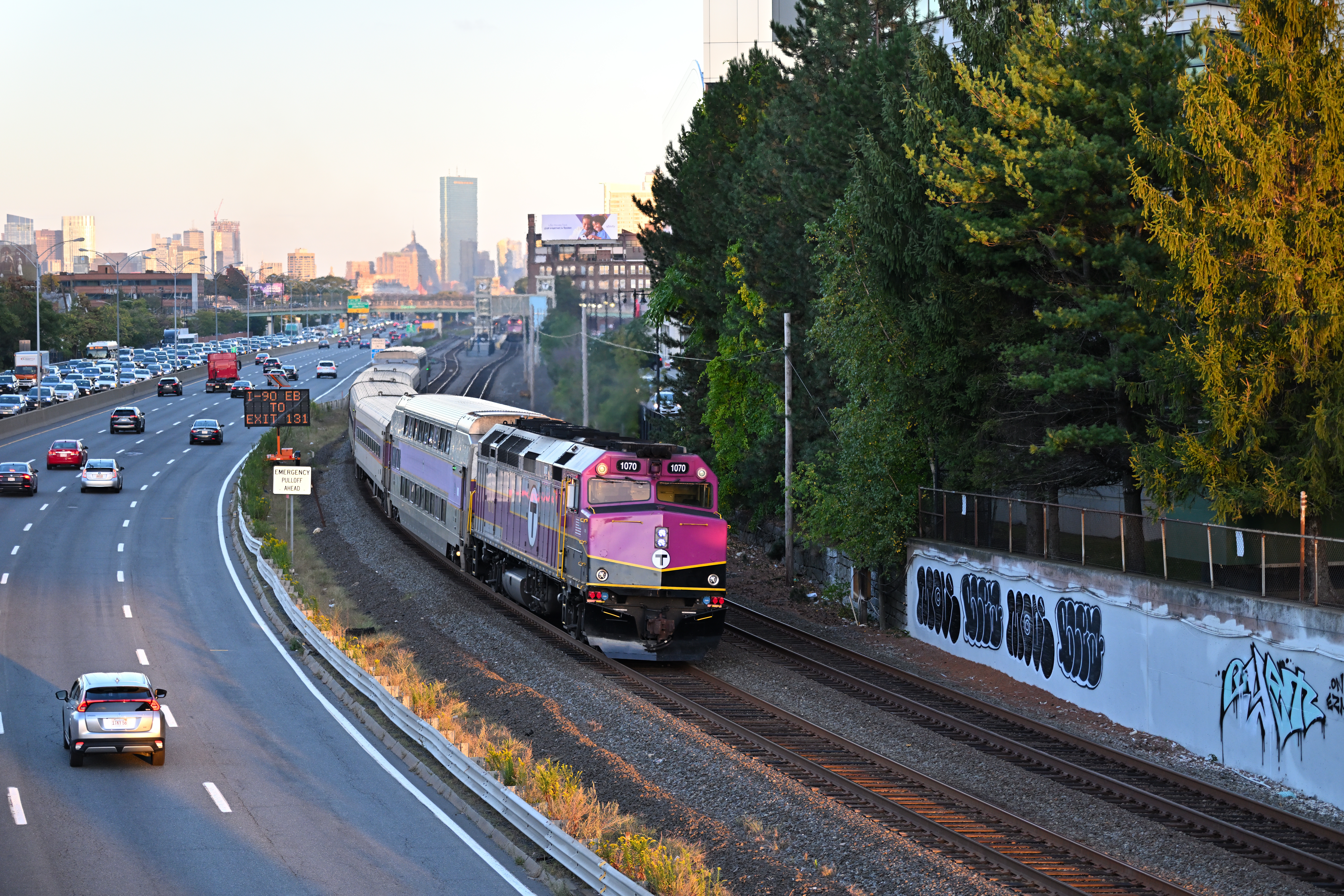
- An outbound train near Boston Landing in 2024

Overview
- Status: Operating
- Owner: MassDOT (Back Bay to Riverside); MBTA (Riverside to Framingham); MassDOT (Framingham to Worcester)
- Locale: Central Massachusetts
- Termini: Boston South Station; Worcester Union Station
- Stations: 18

Service
- Type: Regional rail/commuter rail
- System: MBTA Commuter Rail
- Train number(s): 5001–5043, 5301-5311 (weekdays); 5501–5520 (weekends)
- Operator: Keolis North America
- Daily ridership: 14,942 (2024)

History
- Opened: 1834–1835 (Boston and Worcester Railroad)

Technical
- Line length: 44.3 miles (71.3 km)
- Track gauge: 4 ft 8 1/2 in (1,435 mm) standard gauge

The Framingham/Worcester Line of the MBTA Commuter Rail system runs west from Boston, Massachusetts, to Worcester, Massachusetts, through the MetroWest region, serving 18 station stops in Boston, Newton, Wellesley, Natick, Framingham, Ashland, Southborough, Westborough, Grafton, and Worcester. It is the fourth-longest and third-busiest line in the MBTA Commuter Rail system. Service on the line is a mix of local and express trains serving Worcester plus short-turn Framingham locals.

The Framingham/Worcester Line was one of the first commuter rail lines, with daily commuter-oriented service to West Newton beginning in 1834. Originally the Boston and Worcester Railroad, service has been operated by the Boston and Albany Railroad, New York Central, Penn Central, and since 1964 by Boston and Maine Railroad, Amtrak, and the MBCR until 2014 under contract to the MBTA. Since 2014 service has been operated by Keolis North America. In 1975 the line was cut back to Framingham, but service returned to Worcester in 1994 with four infill stations added between 2000 and 2002.

After purchasing the Framingham–Worcester trackage from CSX in 2012, the MBTA has begun adding service to the outer section of the line and performing track work to increase speeds and reliability. A new station at Boston Landing opened in 2017. All stations from Boston Landing east and Natick Center west are accessible; renovations to the six remaining stations are planned.

== History ==
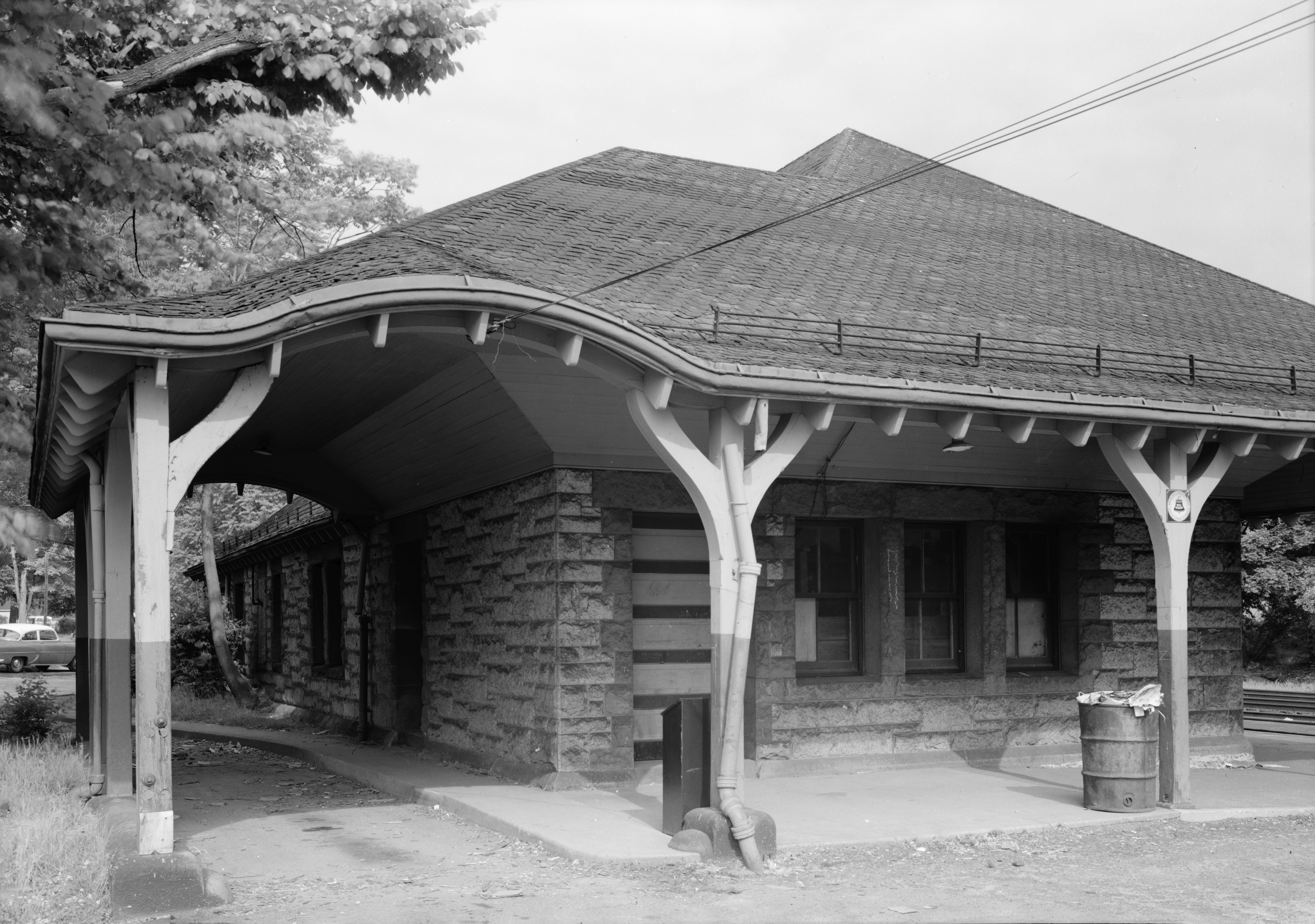
This 1881-built depot at Auburndale, designed by H. H. Richardson, was torn down in 1961 to make room for the Massachusetts Turnpike

Originally built in 1834 as the Boston and Worcester Railroad, the line was later part of the Boston and Albany Railroad and New York Central Railroad systems. The Massachusetts Turnpike Authority acquired the tracks from Newton to Back Bay station in order to construct the Boston Extension of the Massachusetts Turnpike from the Route 128 circumferential highway to the then-elevated Central Artery in downtown Boston. Construction ran from 1962 to 1964, and reduced the railway to two tracks.

The New York Central was merged into Penn Central Transportation in 1968, which went bankrupt in 1970. Amtrak was created in 1971 to take over intercity rail service from the private railroads. When Amtrak started operations on May 1, 1971, no intercity service was kept on the line, thus ending direct connections from Boston to Springfield, Pittsfield, and Albany. In mid-May, Amtrak added the Boston-New Haven Bay State. The train struggled to find consistent ridership, with frequent changes of schedule and destination. In 1973, the westbound trip operated as a quasi-commuter train. The Bay State was canceled on March 1, 1975.

On January 27, 1973, the Massachusetts Bay Transportation Authority (MBTA) acquired the remainder of the tracks east of Framingham, and began subsidizing service between Framingham and Boston. Commuter rail service between Worcester and Framingham (with no intermediate stops after 1960) was not subsidized by the MBTA; with just ten riders per day riding from Worcester, service was cut back to Framingham on October 27, 1975. Amtrak began operating a Boston-Albany section of the Lake Shore Limited four days later. Boston-New Haven (Inland Route) service was restored under the Bay State name in 1984, and ran in various forms until the early 2000s.

The trackage on the western segment was inherited by Conrail in 1976, which returned to profitability in the 1980s; after a corporate breakup in 1999, CSX Transportation became the owner of the Worcester-to-Framingham segment. Service along the remaining Boston-Framingham segment was considerably increased in October 1979; this was intended to partially compensate for the closure of the Needham Line that month to make room for Southwest Corridor construction. As part of the Southwest Corridor project, the Orange Line was rerouted into parallel tracks sharing the Framingham Line's right of way between Back Bay station and the portal to the Washington Street Tunnel.

MBTA commuter rail service expanded to Worcester on September 26, 1994, with limited rush-hour-only service. Off-peak service was added beginning on December 14, 1996. Worcester Union Station underwent a major renovation in 2000, and in 2006 the city's main bus terminal was co-located at the train station. Infill stations at Ashland, Southborough, Westborough, and Grafton were added in 2000 and 2002. The total cost of the Worcester Commuter Rail Extension Project was $97 million.

=== Ownership and performance problems ===
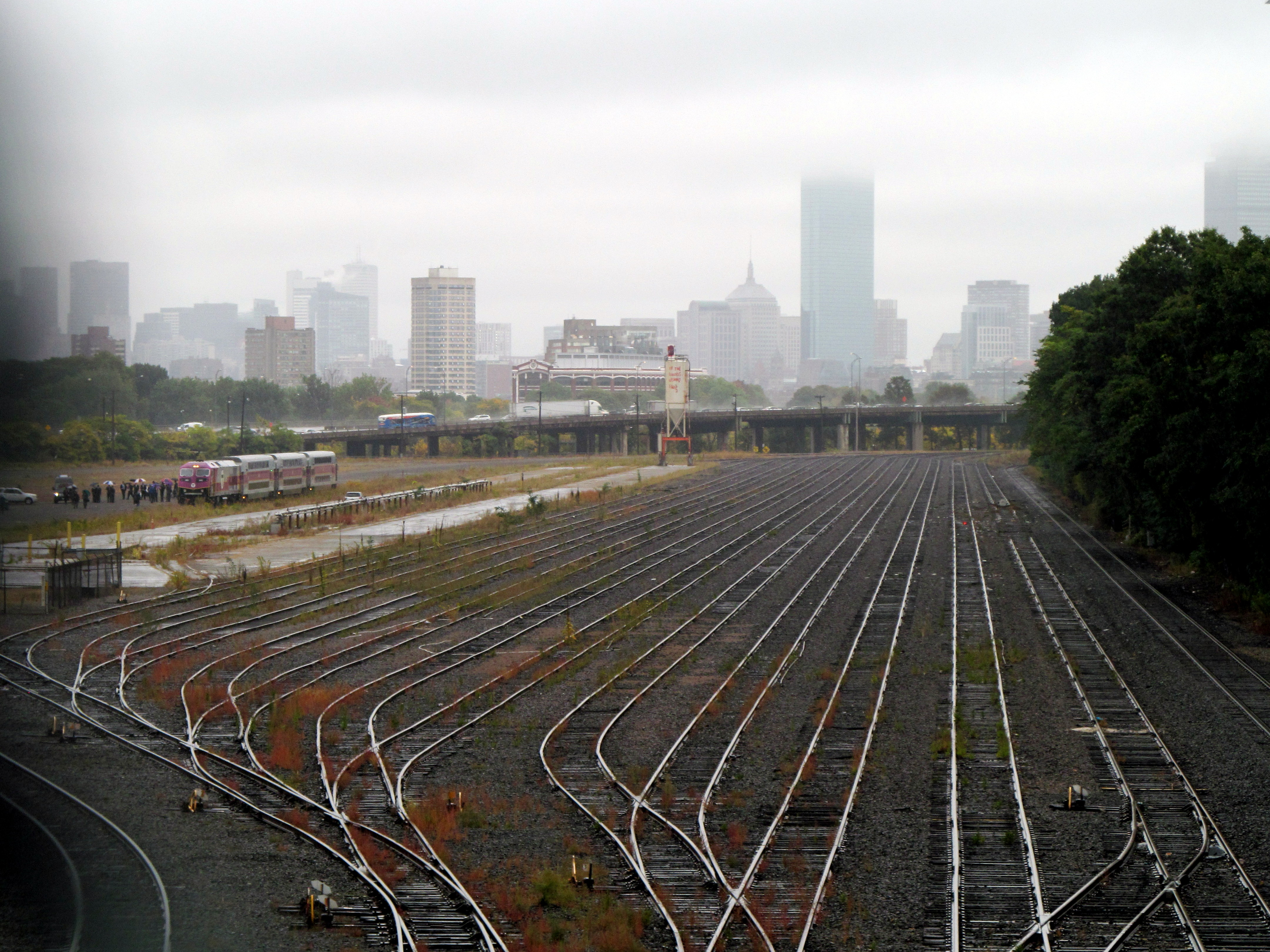
Empty Beacon Park Yard in 2014

For a variety of reasons, the line had some of the worst on-time performance in the MBTA system for several years. While state agencies including the MBTA owned the line out to Framingham, CSX Transportation owned from Framingham to Worcester and ran frequent freight trains as far east as Beacon Park Yard in Allston. CSX then dispatched (controlled signals) on the line from their operations base in Selkirk, New York, resulting in low priority for passenger trains. Conflicts with freight trains, ongoing track work, and an increase of passenger load of about 40% since opening were all blamed for the poor on-time performance, as were new federal speed regulations that went into effect in 2005.

In 2007, pessimistic that CSX would ever sell the line, the state Executive Office of Transportation began studying alternatives to improve service. Possibilities included adding interlockings or additional tracks to the line, or even running service from Worcester to North Station via Ayer over the Pan Am Railways Worcester Branch (former Worcester, Nashua and Rochester Railroad) and the Fitchburg Line.

In October 2007, only 48.4% of trains ran on time (no more than 1 minute early or 5 minutes late), improving to 69.3% in January 2008 after CSX and MBCR officials began meeting daily. On February 18, 2008, a new schedule went into effect, intended to more accurately reflect the run time on the line. By August 2009, actual on-time performance was at 82%.

In January 2008, the Framingham/Worcester Line became the first in the MBTA system to offer Wi-Fi service aboard the trains. The service was expanded system-wide after a test period, but the Worcester Line was chosen for the pilot phase in part to compensate for low on-time performance, as well as to test the service across the line's varied terrain.

On October 2, 2008, the state government announced an agreement with CSX Transportation for the purchase and upgrade of several of CSX's freight lines in the state. CSX agreed to sell the Framingham-to-Worcester section of the Worcester Line, its lines from Taunton to Fall River and New Bedford for use by the South Coast Rail project, the Grand Junction Branch, and the South Boston Running Track. Other parts of the agreement included plans for double-stack freights west of Worcester and the abandonment of Beacon Park Yard. Weekday Worcester service was increased to twelve round trips on October 27, 2008, under the agreement. The agreement was signed on September 23, 2009, with the Worcester Line transfer then expected in 2011.

=== Service expansions ===
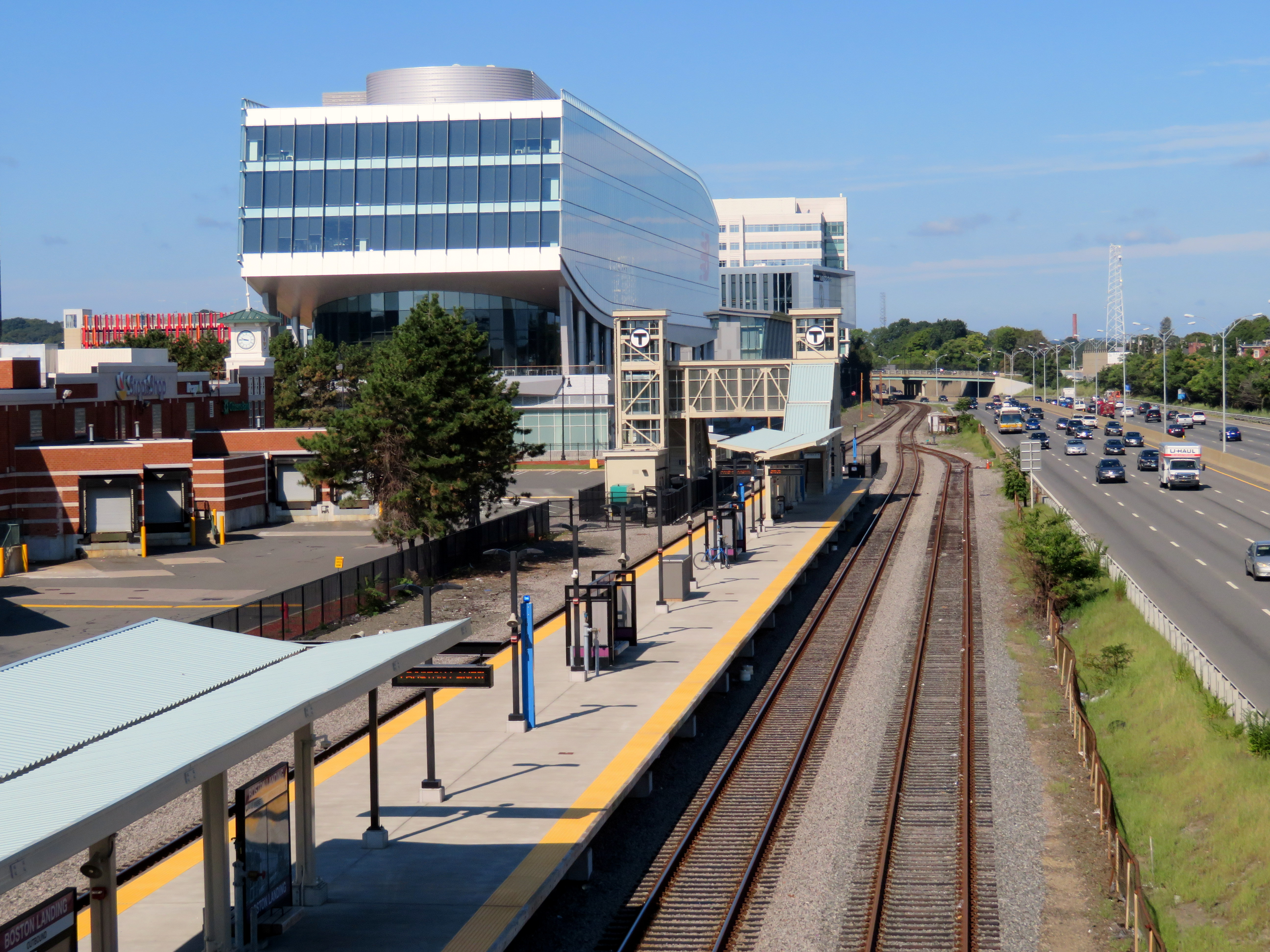
Boston Landing station in 2018

In June 2012, New Balance announced plans to build a new station stop at their new development in Allston-Brighton. Boston Landing was originally to open in 2014, but was delayed until May 22, 2017.

In July 2012, the MBTA announced plans to add additional service on the line as CSX moved freight transload operations from Beacon Park Yard in Allston to a new yard in East Worcester that did not interfere with passenger operations. Three additional weekday Boston-Worcester round trips were added on October 29, 2012, after the October 4 signing of the deed that transferred ownership of the Framingham-Worcester section to the MBTA. A rush-hour express serving Worcester was added on April 29, 2013. The ultimate goal was originally for 20 Worcester round trips by October 2013, up from 12.5 round trips before the service increases; however this was pushed back by delays in the rebuilding of Yawkey station and the delivery of the new MPI HSP46 locomotives and bilevel passenger cars.

By early 2013, Beacon Park was largely vacated except for the locomotive maintenance facility, leaving only occasional freight service east of Framingham. MBCR took over dispatching of the line from CSX in August 2013, meaning that passenger trains are now given full priority over freight trains. The dispatching changeover brings other benefits for passenger service: MBCR has greater flexibility to deal with minor emergencies affecting operations, to communicate directly with train crews, and to dispatch extra trains to cover for a late or stalled train. Blanket heat-related speed restrictions were intended to be eliminated, limiting delays even on hotter summer days.

A series of public comment hearings in 2013 were held to determine schedules. Implementation of the new schedules was delayed because the completion of Yawkey station's rehabilitation and expansion was delayed. The expansion included installation of a second track, crucial to the service expansion. The increase to 20 weekday and 9 weekend round trips to Worcester took place on March 10, 2014. The MBTA has long been planning to speed travel times on the line by adding a second main track through Beacon Park Yard – the only single-track section of the line. The former second track through the yard was turned into a yard lead with no through service in the 1950s.

In November 2013, MassDOT announced plans to spend $15 million through 2014 and 2015 to improve travel times on the line. Some of the work involves heating and cutting quarter-mile rail segments to eliminate heat kinks. The promised reduction in heat-related speed restrictions has not yet occurred due to the poor condition of the tracks; the work to reduce them started in 2014 with $1.2 million in work between Worcester and Grafton, but will not be complete until 2016.

In early 2014, MassDOT proposed DMU local service for the inner part of the line as part of the "Indigo Line". In September 2014, MassDOT announced plans to build the multimodal West Station in Beacon Park Yard as a transfer point between local DMU service and mainline locomotive-hauled commuter rail service. The $25 million station would have been constructed simultaneously with a $260 million reconfiguration of the Mass Pike through Beacon Park Yard and was planned to open in 2020. Plans for DMU service were cancelled in 2015, and West Station was delayed to 2040. On May 23, 2016, the MBTA began running a single daily round trip – inbound in the morning rush, outbound in the late evening – with no intermediate stops between Yawkey (later renamed to Lansdowne) and Worcester. Branded "HeartToHub", the trips were scheduled for travel times of under one hour between Back Bay and Worcester, slightly faster than the driving time between those two locations.

=== COVID-19 cuts and construction projects ===
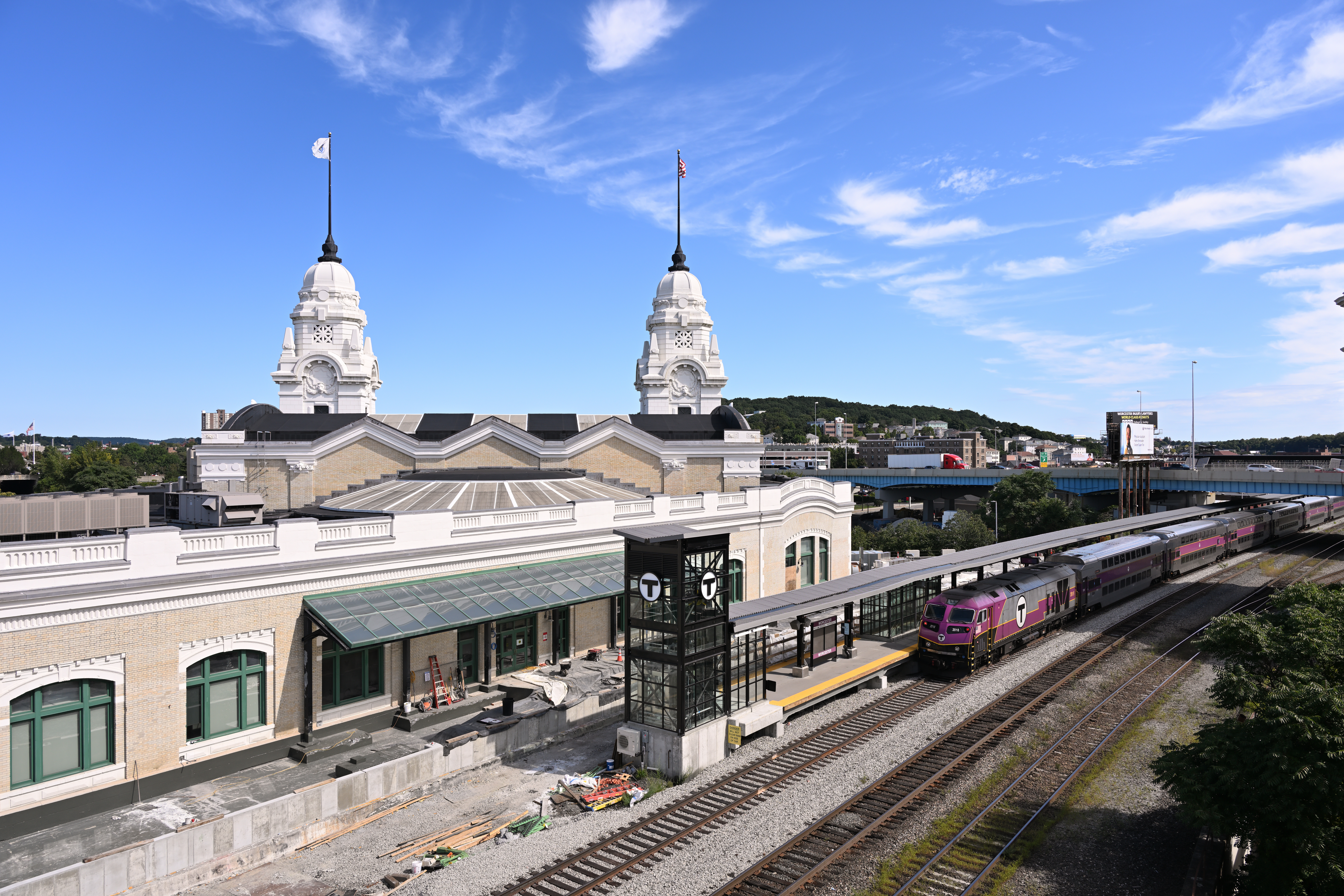
The new platform at Worcester Union Station in use in 2024

Weekday service was substantially cut on March 17, 2020, due to reduced ridership during the COVID-19 pandemic. On June 22, service was increased, but all trains continued to run local. Schedule changes effective November 2, 2020 re-added express service, including the Heart to Hub service (with an added Framingham stop). Reduced service operated from December 14, 2020, to April 5, 2021, again as part of systemwide reductions.

Service changes on April 5, 2021, began the transition to a regional rail model, with hourly Boston–Worcester service. Worcester service began to operate express between Boston Landing and West Natick at peak hours, with hourly Boston–Framingham local trains at those times to provide service to the inner part of the line. Because the single-platform Newton stations could only be served by trains in one direction at peak service levels, a "Newton Connection Railbus" bus shuttle operated between Newton Highlands and Wellesley Farms to provide reverse-peak service to the stations. The bus shuttle ended service on August 27, 2021, as route 505 bus service resumed two days later. By October 2022, the line had 10,606 daily riders – 57% of pre-COVID ridership. The "Heart to Hub" trains were converted to regular express trains effective October 2, 2023. A morning "Heart to Hub" round trip was re-added on May 20, 2024. Daily ridership was 14,942 by 2024.

An accessibility reconstruction of Natick Center station began in March 2020, followed by the addition of a new island platform at Worcester Union Station beginning in late 2021. Midday service was temporarily reduced from May 2 to October 17, 2022; July 10 to September 11, 2023; and November 18, 2024, to January 6, 2025, to accommodate the construction projects. The new platform at Worcester opened on July 1, 2024, while the rebuilt Natick Center station opened on July 21, 2025. As of August 2024, the MBTA intends to run Framingham–Boston locals and Worcester–Boston zone expresses, with both services on 30-minute headways, by 2026.

In June 2021, the MBTA issued a $28 million design contract for a project to add a third track from Weston to Framingham, including reconstruction of the three Wellesley stations and West Natick station. The project was expected to cost around $400 million, with completion in 2030. Renovations to the three Newton stations (including the addition of second platforms) are also planned. Design work for the Newton stations was paused at 75% completion in September 2023 because project costs had risen to $255 million. In April 2024, the MBTA indicated that it would proceed with Newtonville before the two other stations, with platform lengths shorter than the MBTA standard to reduce construction costs. In November 2024, the state committed to the reconstruction of Newtonville station.

=== Electrification ===
The Framingham/Worcester line is planned to be electrified as part of the MBTA's regional rail transformation initiatives. Funding for electrification of the line was included in a 2022 state bond bill. In June 2022, the MBTA indicated plans to purchase battery electric multiple units, with catenary for charging on part of the network. By the mid-2020s, the MBTA had adapted short-term plans for regional rail to instead optimize diesel-hauled operations for increased services on select corridors. In December 2024, the MBTA indicated plans to implement 30-minute all-day headways on the Framingham/Worcester Line by fiscal year 2026. Train consists would be shortened to 4 coaches long to enable higher frequencies; 4-car BEMU train sets would be implemented on the line by the late 2030s.

== Station listing ==
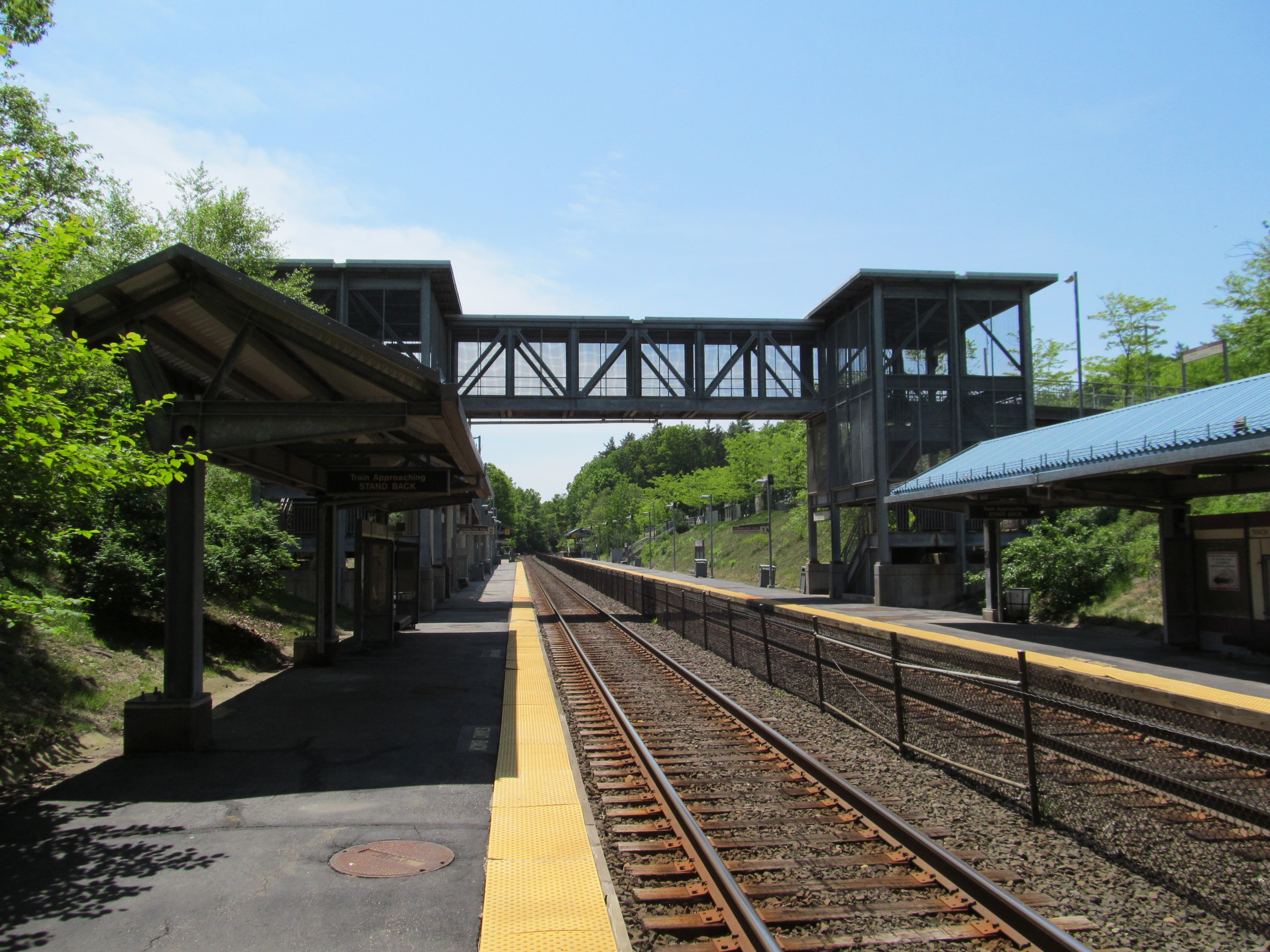
Grafton station, with large ramps and mini-high platforms for accessibility, is typical of the west-of-Framingham stations built around 2000

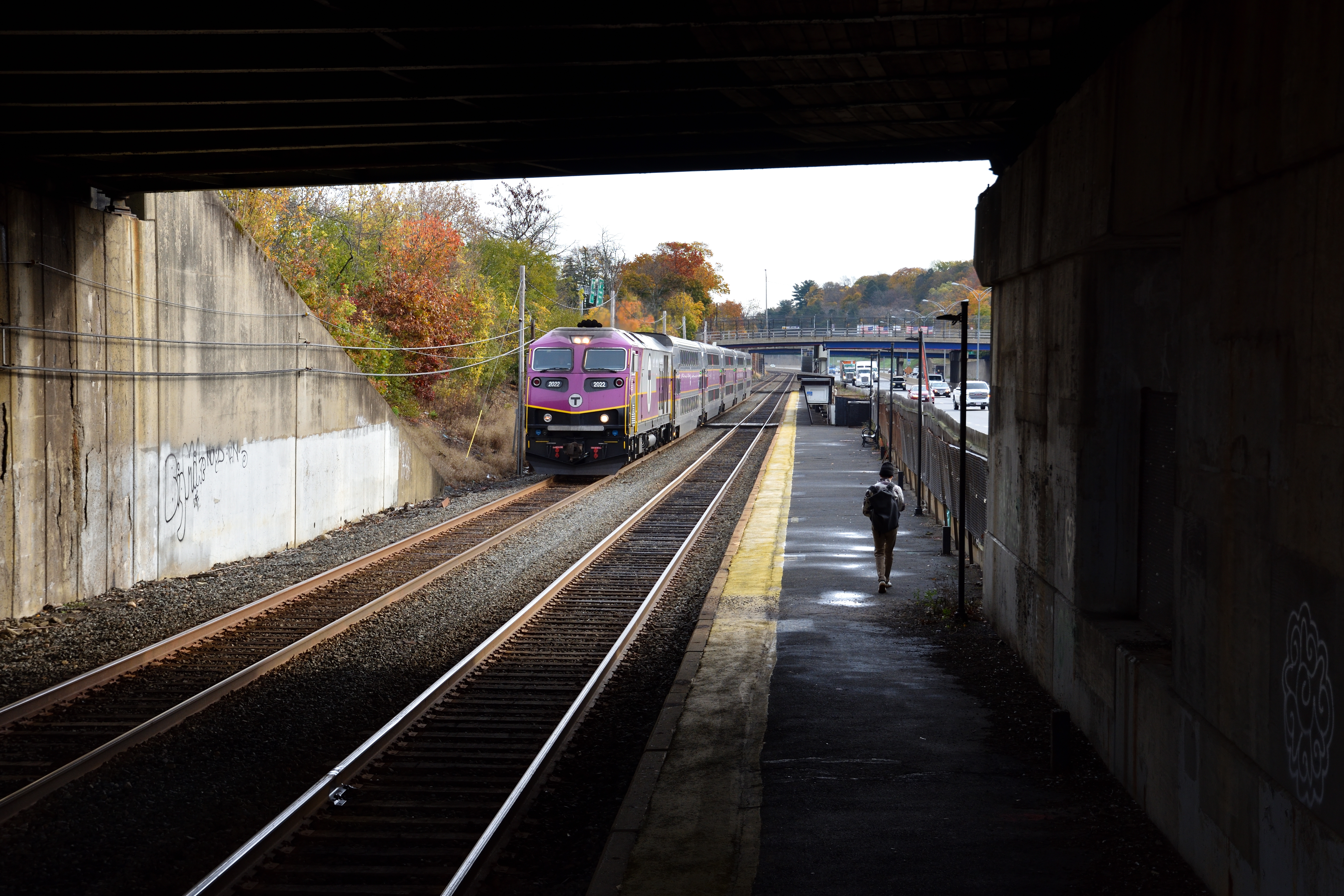
West Newton station, with a single non-accessible platform. As with the other Newton stops, non-peak-direction trains skip West Newton due to the single platform.

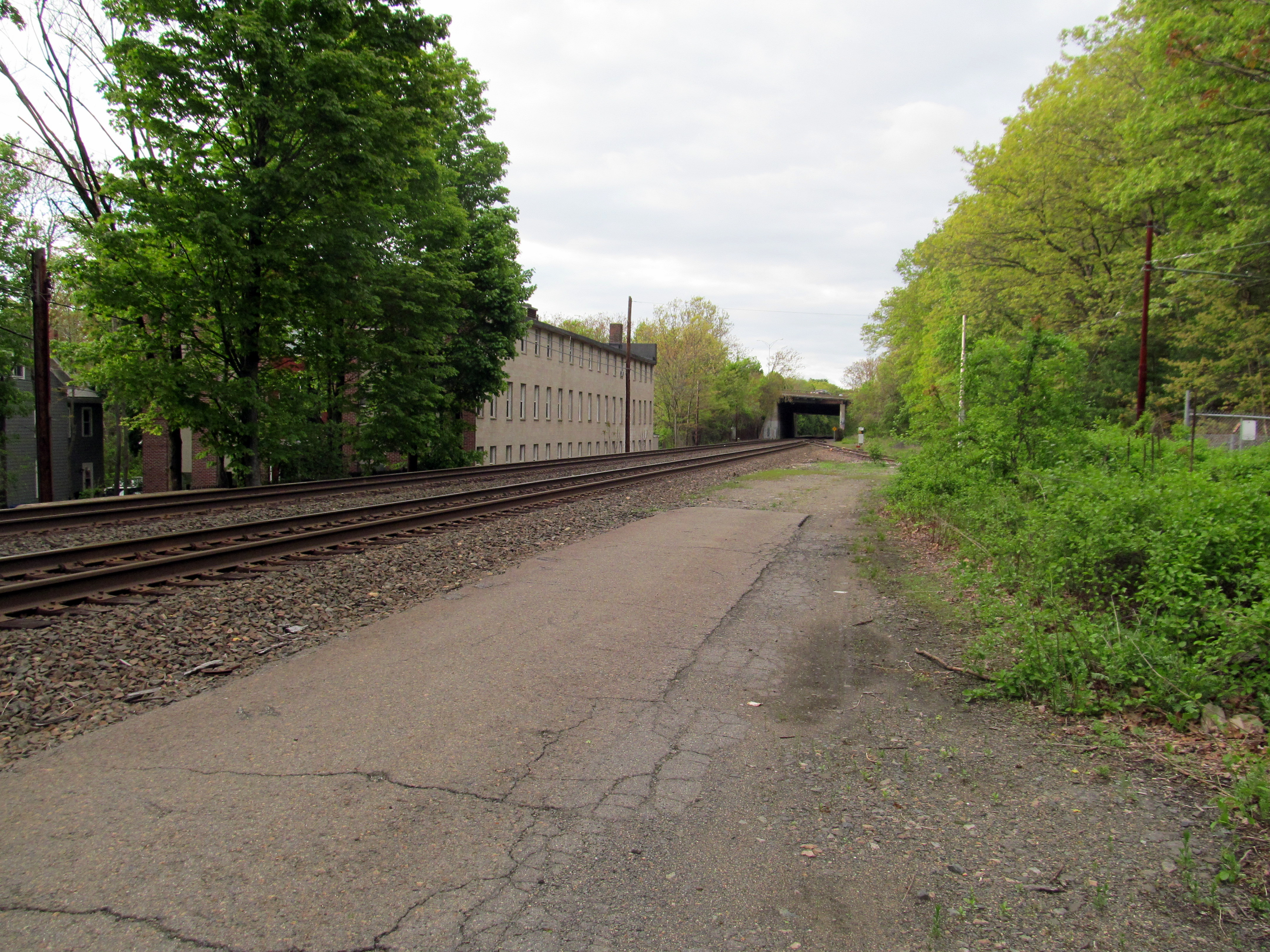
Riverside station (former platform pictured) is the only station on the line closed during the MBTA era

| Fare zone | Location | Miles (km) | Station | Connections and notes |
|---|---|---|---|---|
| 1A | Boston | 0.0 (0.0) | South Station | Amtrak: Acela, Lake Shore Limited, Northeast Regional; MBTA Commuter Rail: Fairmount, Fall River/New Bedford, Franklin/Foxboro, Greenbush, Kingston, Needham, Providence/Stoughton; CapeFLYER (seasonal); MBTA subway: Red Line, Silver Line (SL1, SL2, SL3, SL4); MBTA bus: 4, 7, 11; Intercity buses at South Station Bus Terminal |
| 1A | Boston | 1.2 (1.9) | Back Bay | Amtrak: Acela, Lake Shore Limited, Northeast Regional; MBTA Commuter Rail: Franklin/Foxboro, Needham, and Providence/Stoughton lines MBTA subway: Orange Line; MBTA bus: 10, 39 |
| 1A | Boston | 2.5 (4.0) | Lansdowne | MBTA bus: 8, 19, 60, 65 |
| 1A | Boston | 3.8 (6.1) | West Station | Proposed station |
| 1A | Boston | 4.7 (7.6) | Boston Landing | MBTA bus: 64 |
| 1 | Newton | 8.1 (13.0) | Newtonville | MBTA bus: 59, 553, 554, 556 |
| 2 | Newton | 9.1 (14.6) | West Newton | MBTA bus: 553, 554 |
| 2 | Newton | 10.2 (16.4) | Auburndale | |
| | Newton | 10.9 (17.5) | Riverside | Closed October 27, 1977 |
| 3 | Wellesley | 12.5 (20.1) | Wellesley Farms | |
| 3 | Wellesley | 13.5 (21.7) | Wellesley Hills | |
| 3 | Wellesley | 14.7 (23.7) | Wellesley Square | |
| 4 | Natick | 17.7 (28.5) | Natick Center | MWRTA: 202, 206, 301, MathWorks Natick Commuter Shuttle, MathWorks Framingham Commuter Shuttle |
| 4 | Natick | 19.9 (32.0) | West Natick | MWRTA: 105, 202, 206, MathWorks Natick Commuter Shuttle |
| 5 | Framingham | 21.4 (34.4) | Framingham | Amtrak: Lake Shore Limited; MWRTA: 101, 103, 104, 107, 202, 207, 305, 306, Greyhound |
| 6 | Ashland | 25.2 (40.6) | Ashland | MWRTA: 202, 305 |
| 6 | Southborough | 27.4 (44.1) | Southborough | MWRTA: 302, 309, 495 |
| 7 | Westborough | 34.0 (54.7) | Westborough | |
| 8 | Grafton | 36.4 (58.6) | Grafton | WRTA: 85 |
| 8 | Worcester | 44.2 (71.1) | Worcester | Amtrak: Lake Shore Limited; WRTA: 1, 2, 3, 4, 5, 6, 7, 11, 12, 14, 15, 16, 19, 23, 24, 26, 27, 29, 30, 31, 33, 42, 825; PVTA: B79; Greyhound, Peter Pan |
Closed station
