= Boston & Albany Railroad Station =

Boston & Albany Railroad Station may refer to:

- Boston & Albany Railroad Station (Framingham)
- Boston & Albany Railroad Station (Newton)
- Boston & Albany Railroad Station (Wellesley Hills)
