= West Natick station =

Railroad station in Natick, Massachusetts, US

West Natick
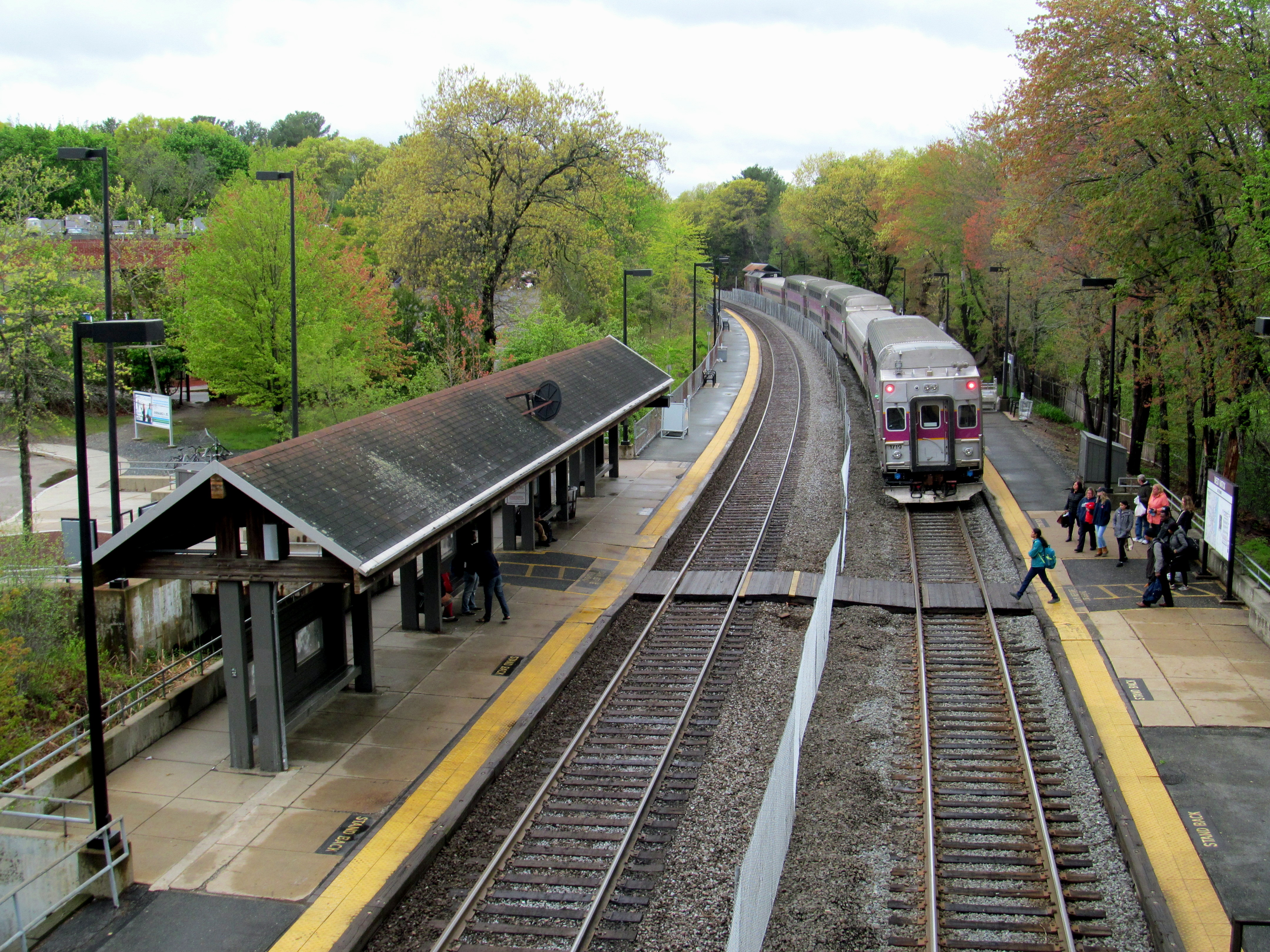
- An outbound train leaving West Natick station in 2017

General information
- Location: 249 West Central Street; Natick, Massachusetts
- Coordinates: 42.2831°N 71.3918°W
- Line: Worcester Main Line
- Platforms: 2 side platforms
- Tracks: 2
- Connections: MWRTA: 10, 11, Natick Commuter Shuttle

Construction
- Parking: 178 spaces
- Cycle facilities: 5 spaces
- Accessible: Yes

Other information
- Fare zone: 4

History
- Opened: August 23, 1982

Passengers
- 2024: 533 daily boardings

Services
Preceding station	MBTA	Following station
Framingham toward Worcester	Framingham/Worcester Line	Natick Center toward South Station
Location

West Natick station is a commuter rail station on the MBTA Commuter Rail Framingham/Worcester Line, located off West Central Street (Route 135) in Natick, Massachusetts. It was opened in 1982 as a park and ride station.

== History ==
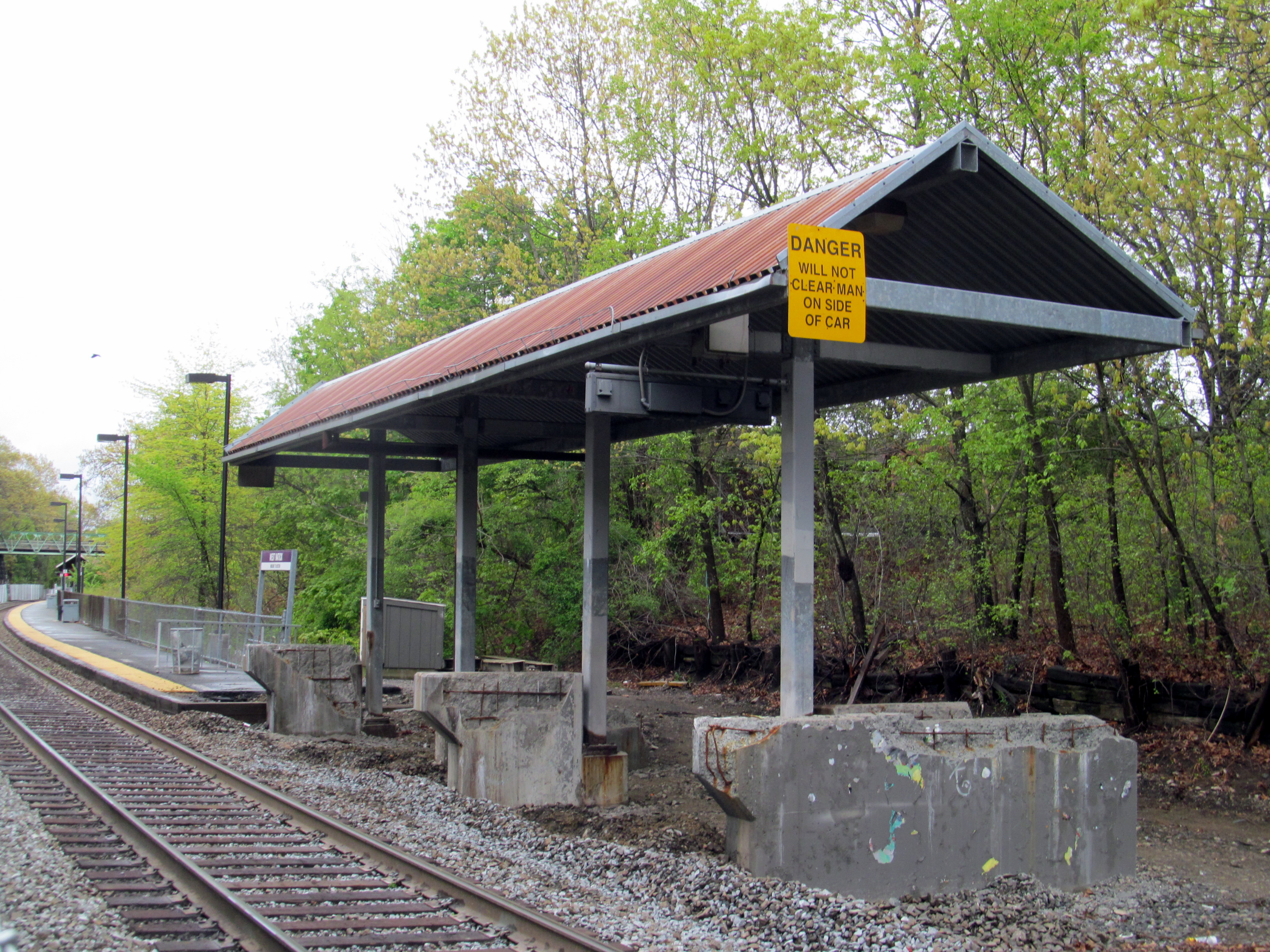
The demolished inbound mini-high platform in May 2017

The Boston and Albany Railroad opened through Natick in September 1834. In the late 1800s, Walkerville station was briefly open at Speen Street, midway between Natick Center and the modern station site.

On August 23, 1982, the MBTA opened West Natick station to ease demand at Natick and Framingham stations. The $500,000 station included a 200-space park and ride lot. The station should have been built accessible (state accessibility laws date from the 1970s, long before the 1990 Americans with Disabilities Act), but it was not due to a budget shortfall. Accessible mini-high sections were installed around 1993.

In early 2016, the mini-high accessible platforms were closed because the folding platform edges were deteriorated, risking a dangerous collapse like one that happened at North Billerica station in 2015. The MBTA earmarked $4 million to replace them and brought a portable lift to the station to maintain accessibility. The mini-high platforms were demolished in March 2017; new composite platforms opened that November.

The adjacent Boden Lane bridge was closed on October 31, 2019, after it was damaged by brush-clearing equipment. On November 5, MassDOT announced that the bridge would be permanently closed and replaced. The bridge was removed in December 2019; a temporary pedestrian span opened on January 27, 2020. Solar panels over the parking lots were added in 2021.

In June 2021, the MBTA issued a $28 million design contract for a project to add a third track from Weston to Framingham, including reconstruction of the three Wellesley stations and West Natick station. The project was expected to cost around $400 million, of which rebuilding West Natick station would be $37 million, with completion in 2030.
