= Wellesley Square station =

Railroad station in Wellesley, Massachusetts, US

Wellesley Square
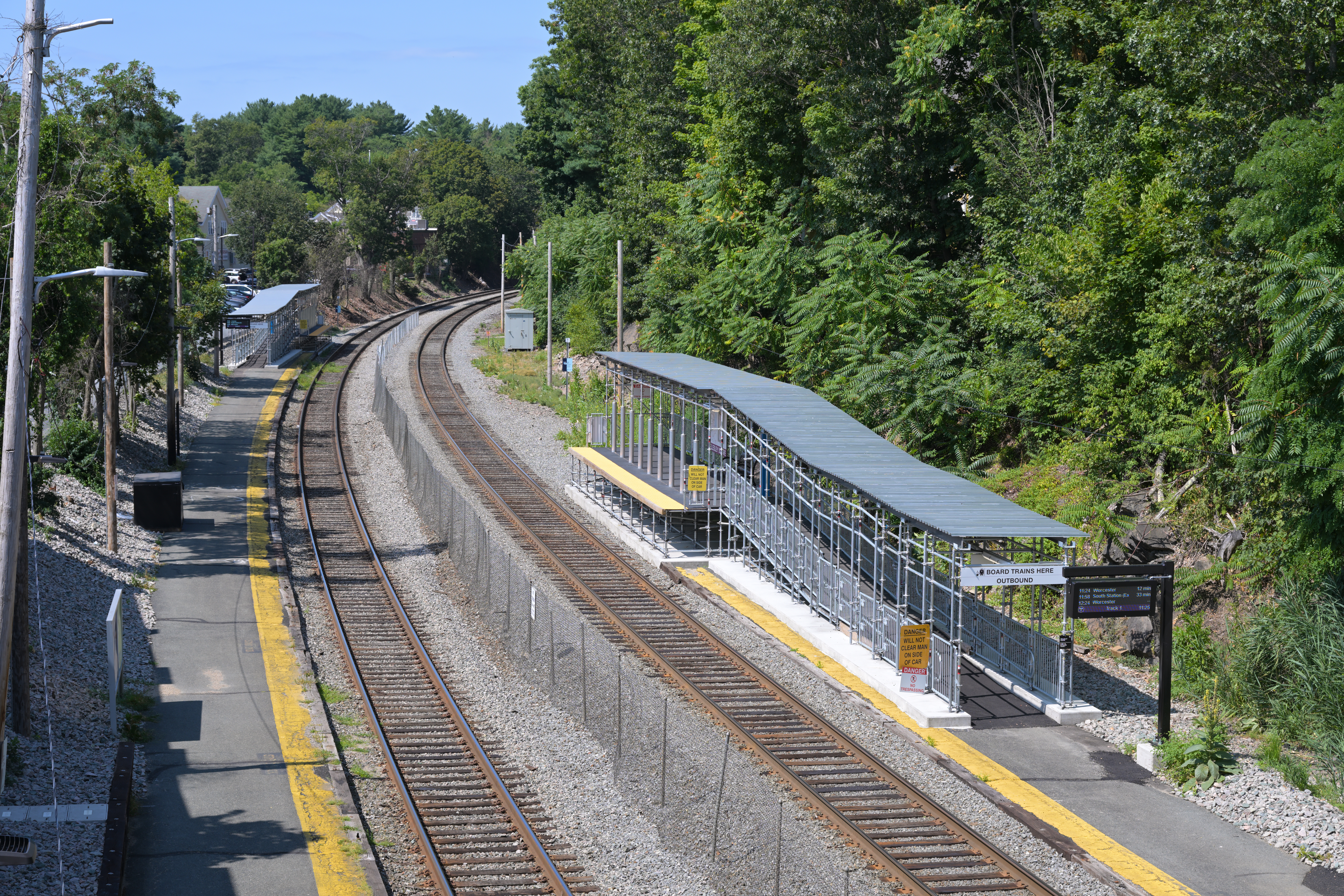
- Wellesley Square station in 2025

General information
- Location: 1 Grove Street; Wellesley, Massachusetts
- Coordinates: 42.29755°N 71.29375°W
- Line: Worcester Main Line
- Platforms: 2 side platforms
- Tracks: 2

Construction
- Parking: 224 spaces
- Accessible: Yes

Other information
- Fare zone: 3

History
- Opened: c. 1845
- Rebuilt: 1889, 1962, 2024–2025
- Former names: West Needham, Wellesley

Passengers
- 2024: 470 daily boardings

Services
Preceding station	MBTA	Following station
Natick Center toward Worcester	Framingham/Worcester Line	Wellesley Hills toward South Station
Former services
Preceding station	New York Central Railroad	Following station
Natick toward Albany	Boston and Albany Railroad Main Line	Wellesley Hills toward Boston
Location

Wellesley Square station is a commuter rail station on the MBTA Commuter Rail Framingham/Worcester Line, located just north of the Route 16-Route 135 intersection in downtown Wellesley, Massachusetts. It serves both walk-up and park-and-ride commuters, with a 224-space parking lot for the latter group. The station has low-level platforms with accessible mini-high platforms.

== History ==
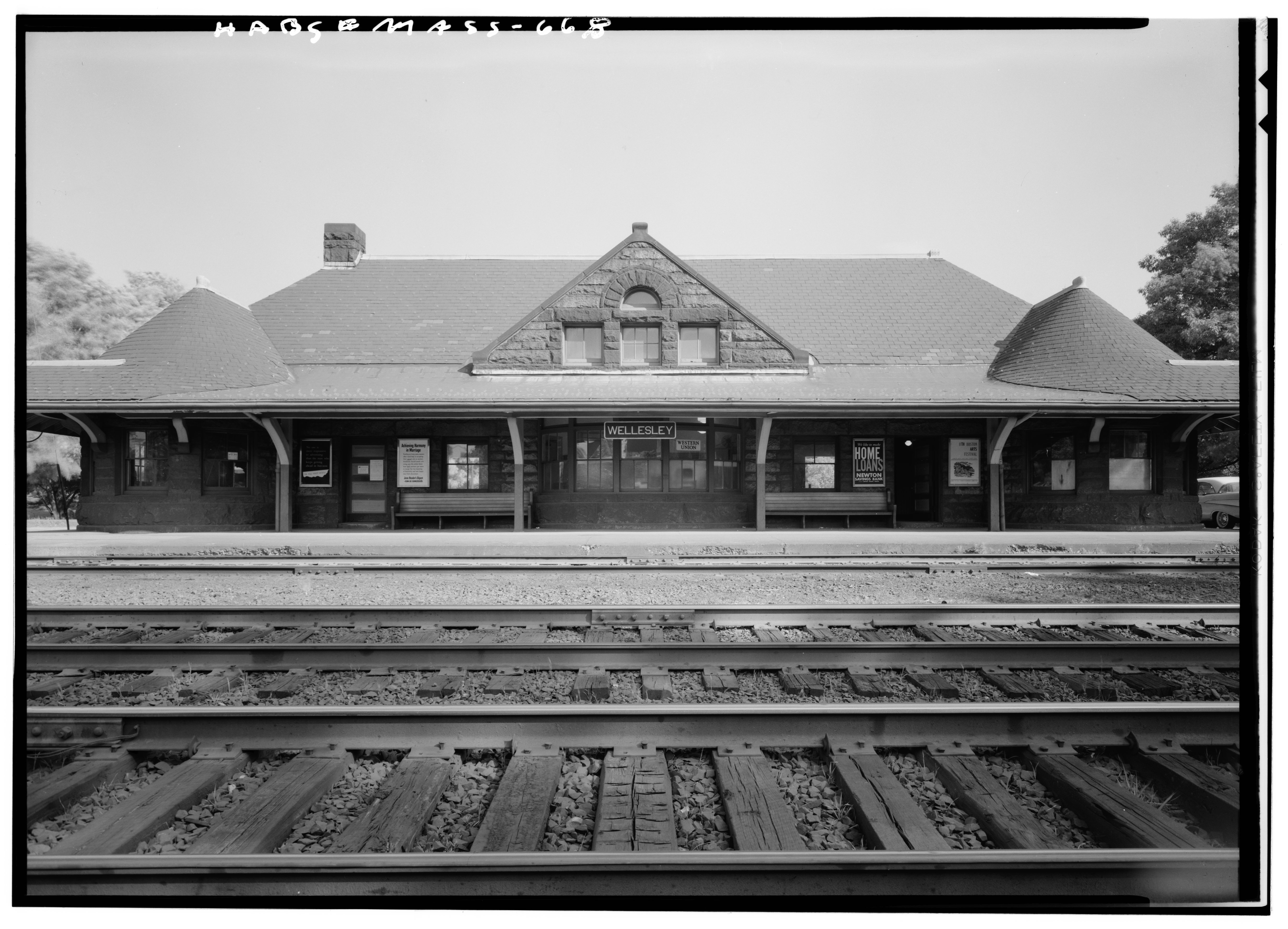
The 1889-built station in June 1959

The Boston & Worcester Railroad (B&W), extending outwards from Boston, reached through the West Parish of Needham in mid-1834. In 1839, the line was double tracked through the area. Around 1844, the railroad proposed to relocate the Needham station building to West Needham, which had more population. A new station building was constructed at West Needham within a year instead.

It was renamed to Wellesley after the adjacent village in 1863, though the West Parish did not formally separate from Needham to become Wellesley until 1881. The wood-framed building was moved half a mile to the east in 1889 (where it still stands, in use as a restaurant), when H. H. Richardson's successors Shepley, Rutan and Coolidge designed a stone Richardsonian Romanesque station for the Boston & Albany Railroad (B&A), which had taken over the B&W.

The 1889-built depot was demolished around 1962 to make room for a post office; only bare asphalt platforms remained. Amtrak began stopping the daily Bay State at Wellesley and Newtonville on January 16, 1972. The Bay State was discontinued on March 1, 1975; when the Lake Shore Limited was introduced that October, it did not stop at Wellesley. In 1977 or 1978, the station was renamed Wellesley Square to differentiate it from the other two stations in Wellesley. Bay State service resumed on October 28, 1984; it stopped at Wellesley until October 25, 1986.

=== Accessibility ===
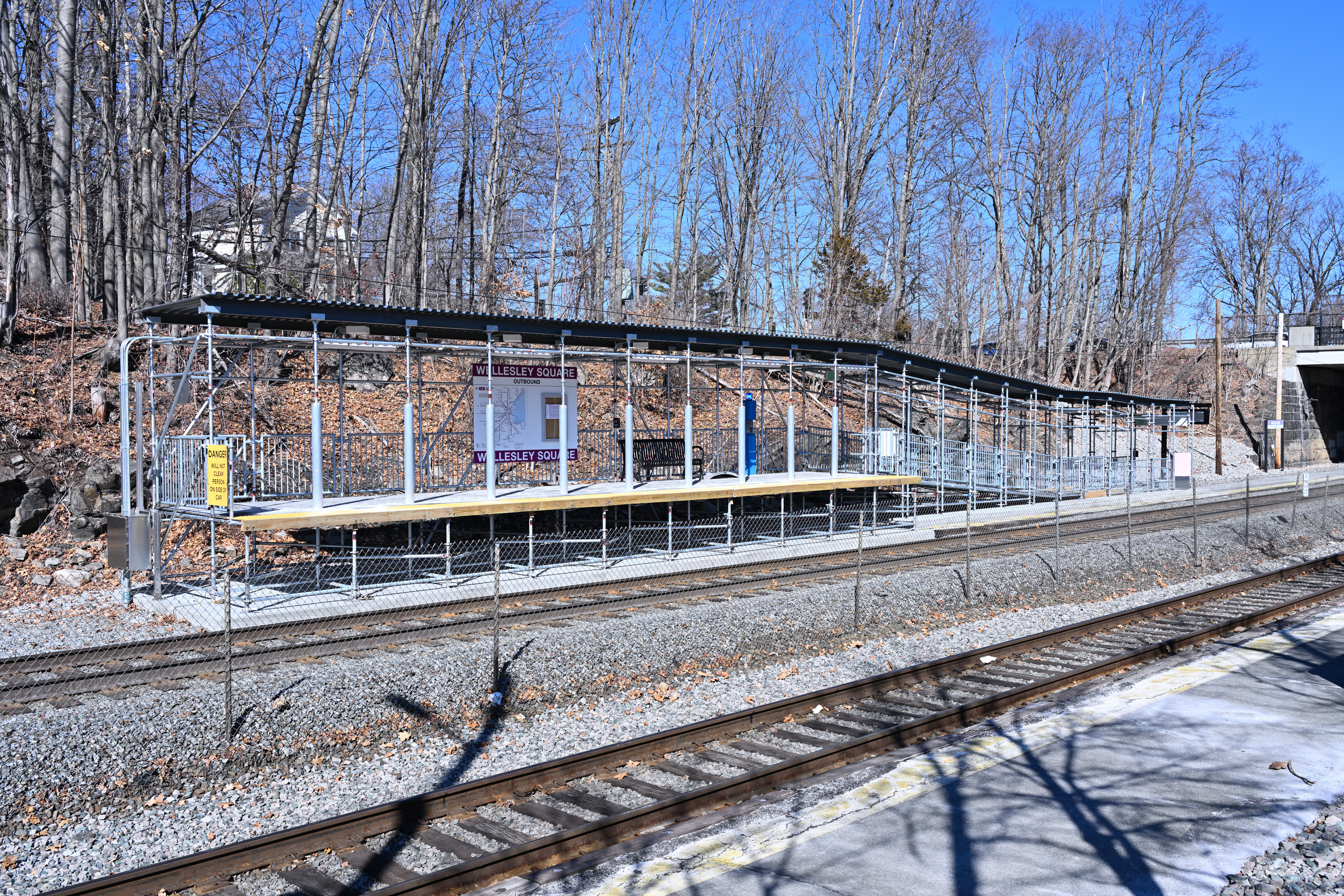
The outbound accessible platform in March 2025

In 2019, the MBTA listed Wellesley Square as a "Tier I" accessibility priority. In June 2021, the MBTA issued a $28 million design contract for a project to add a third track from Weston to Framingham, including reconstruction of the three Wellesley stations and West Natick station. The project was expected to cost around $400 million, of which rebuilding Wellesley Square station would be $31–35 million, with completion in 2030.

In 2024, the MBTA tested a temporary freestanding accessible platform design at Beverly Depot. These platforms do not require alterations to the existing platforms, thus skirting federal rules requiring full accessibility renovations when stations are modified, and were intended to provide interim accessibility at lower cost pending full reconstruction. Wellesley Square was one of the first four non-accessible stations to be modified with the temporary platforms. Construction began in 2024. The platforms opened on February 17, 2025. However, the route between the platforms is indirect and is not accessible due to the slope of the Crest Road bridge. As of December 2025, the MBTA and town plan to make further modifications to provide an accessible path.
