= Wellesley Farms station =

Train station in Wellesley, Massachusetts

Wellesley Farms
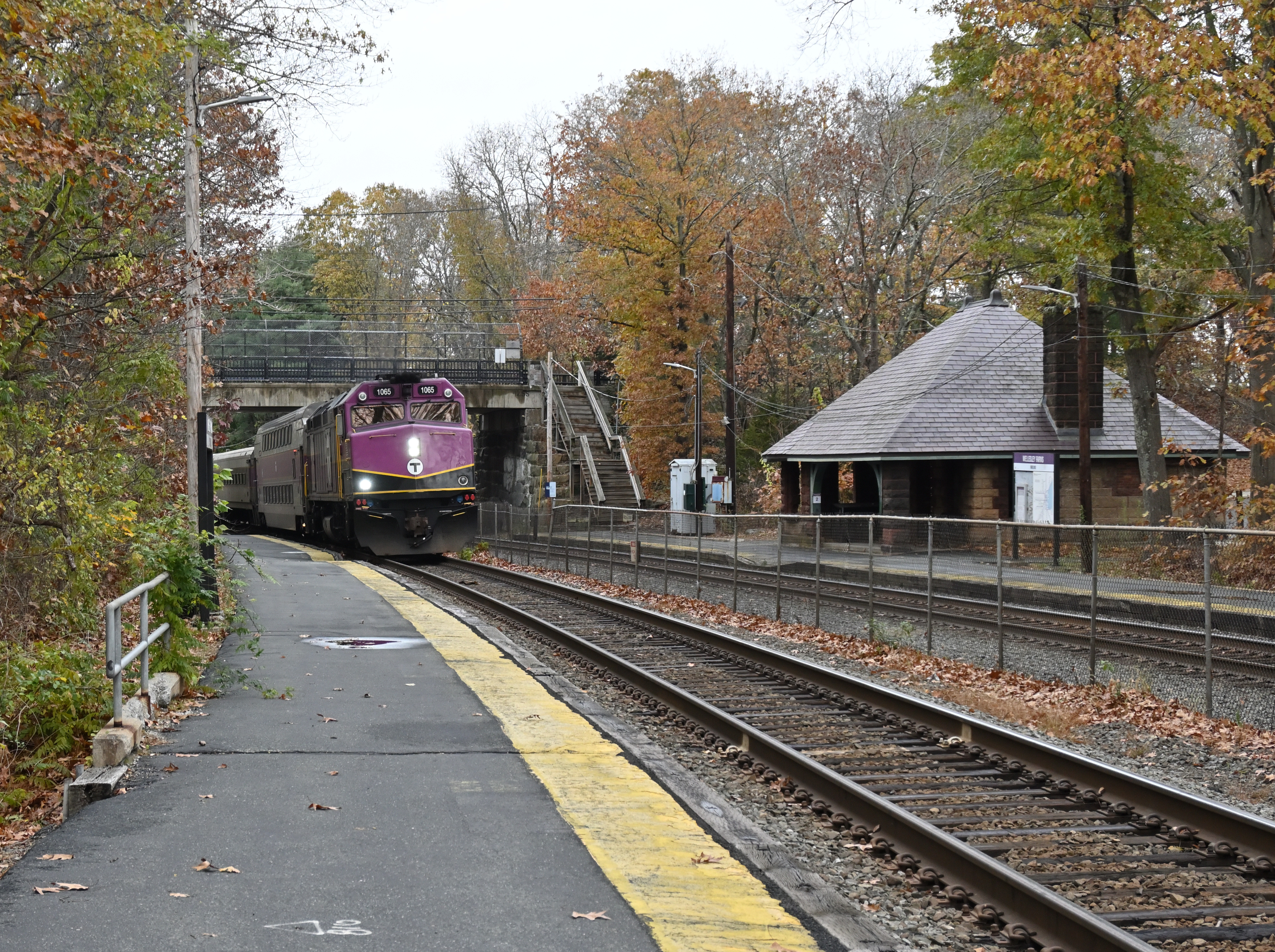
- Wellesley Farms station in 2023

General information
- Location: 90 Croton Street; Wellesley, Massachusetts
- Coordinates: 42°19′23.5″N 71°16′19″W
- Owner: Town of Wellesley
- Line: Worcester Main Line
- Platforms: 2 side platforms
- Tracks: 2

Construction
- Parking: 190 spaces
- Cycle facilities: 16 spaces
- Accessible: No

Other information
- Fare zone: 3

History
- Opened: 1830s
- Rebuilt: 1890
- Former names: Rice's Crossing

Passengers
- 2024: 247 daily boardings

Services
Preceding station	MBTA	Following station
Wellesley Hills toward Worcester	Framingham/Worcester Line	Auburndale toward South Station
Former services
Preceding station	New York Central Railroad	Following station
Wellesley Hills toward Albany	Boston and Albany Railroad Main Line	Riverside toward Boston
- Wellesley Farms Railroad Station
- U.S. National Register of Historic Places
- Interactive map of Wellesley Farms Railroad Station
- Location: Croton Street Extension, Wellesley, Massachusetts, US
- Area: 2.1 acres (0.85 ha)
- Built: 1890
- Architect: H.H. Richardson
- Architectural style: Romanesque, Richardsonian Romanesque
- NRHP reference No.: 86000259
- Added to NRHP: February 14, 1986
Location

Wellesley Farms station is an MBTA Commuter Rail station in Wellesley, Massachusetts. It serves the Framingham/Worcester Line. It is located in the Wellesley Farms area. The station building, designed by Henry Hobson Richardson in 1886 and constructed in 1890, was listed on the U.S. National Register of Historic Places as Wellesley Farms Railroad Station in 1986.

== History ==
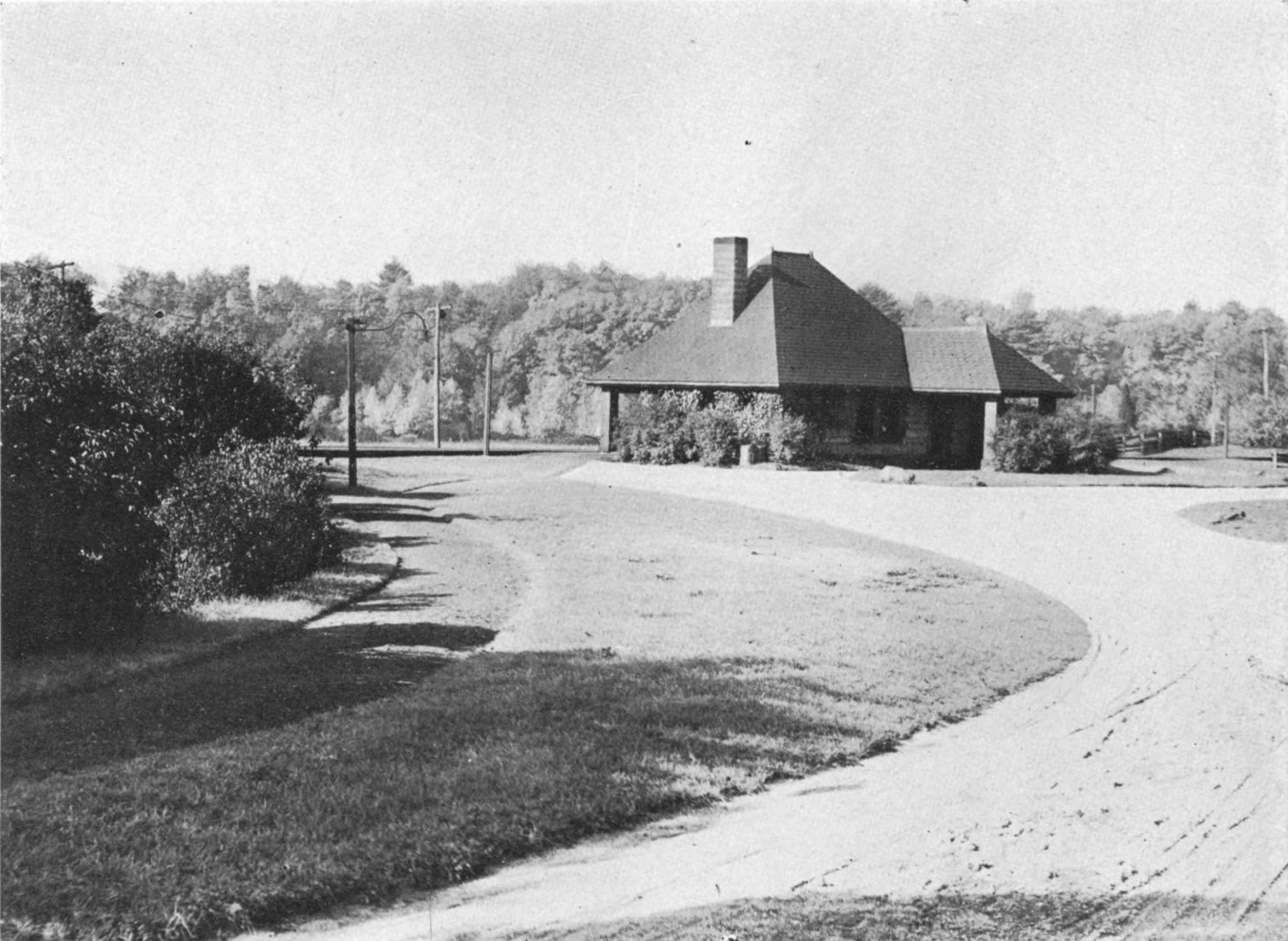
Wellesley Farms station in 1915

The Boston & Worcester Railroad (B&W), extending outwards from Boston, reached through the West Parish of Needham in mid-1834. Rice's Crossing station opened as a flag stop north of Glen Road soon afterward. In 1839, the line was double tracked through the area.

Wellesley Farms station, which was designed by Henry Hobson Richardson prior to his death in 1886, opened south of Glen Road to replace Rice's Crossing in 1890. Like many B&A stations, it had attractive landscaping; Charles Mulford Robinson called it "unique, and to be remembered" in 1904.

The station was added to the National Register of Historic Places in 1986. In July 2004, the MBTA closed a paved crossing between the crossings in response to concerns about safety. Similar crossings exist at some other MBTA stations, but the agency's policy is to eliminate grade crossings whenever possible when building or renovating stations.

In June 2021, the MBTA issued a $28 million design contract for a project to add a third track from Weston to Framingham, including reconstruction of the three Wellesley stations and West Natick station. The project was expected to cost around $400 million, of which rebuilding Wellesley Farms station would be $34 million, with completion in 2030. In May 2024, the MBTA listed Wellesley Farms as one of seven stations that would require "complex solutions" to be made accessible.
