= Wellesley, Massachusetts =

- Town
- Wellesley Town Hall

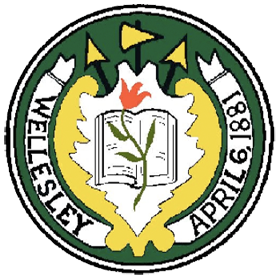
- Seal

- Location of Wellesley in Norfolk County, Massachusetts

- Location in Massachusetts
- Coordinates: 42°17′47″N 71°17′35″W
- Country: United States
- State: Massachusetts
- County: Norfolk
- Settled: 1660
- Incorporated: 1881

Government
  - Type: Representative town meeting
  - Executive Director of General Government Services: Meghan Jop

Area
  - Total: 10.49 sq mi (27.2 km^{2})
  - Land: 10.18 sq mi (26.4 km^{2})
  - Water: 0.31 sq mi (0.80 km^{2})
- Elevation: 141 ft (43 m)

Population (2020)
  - Total: 29,550
  - Density: 2,902.75/sq mi (1,120.76/km^{2})
- Time zone: UTC−5 (Eastern)
  - Summer (DST): UTC−4 (Eastern)
- ZIP Codes: 02482 (Wellesley); 02481 (Wellesley Hills); 02457 (Babson Park)
- Area code: 339/781
- FIPS code: 25-74175
- GNIS feature ID: 0618332
- Website: wellesleyma.gov

Wellesley (/ˈwɛlzli/) is a town in Norfolk County, Massachusetts, United States. Wellesley is part of the Greater Boston metropolitan area. The population was 29,550 at the time of the 2020 census. Wellesley College, Babson College, and a campus of Massachusetts Bay Community College are located in the town.

== History ==
Wellesley was settled in the 1600s as part of Dedham, Massachusetts. It was subsequently a part of Needham, Massachusetts, called West Needham. On October 23, 1880, West Needham residents voted to secede from Needham, and the town of Wellesley was later christened by the Massachusetts legislature on April 6, 1881. The town was named after the estate "Wellesley" of local benefactor Horatio Hollis Hunnewell.

Wellesley's population grew by over 80 percent around the 1920s.

== Geography ==
Wellesley is located in eastern Massachusetts. It is bordered on the east by Newton, on the north by Weston, on the south by Needham and Dover and on the west by Natick. According to the United States Census Bureau, the town has a total area of 10.49 square miles (27.2 km^{2}), of which 10.18 square miles (26.4 km^{2}) is land and 0.32 square miles (0.83 km^{2}) is water.

=== Neighborhoods ===
- Wellesley Farms
- The Fells
- Wellesley Hills (02481)
- Wellesley Square (02482)
- Poets' Corner
- Babson Park (02457)
- Peirce Estates
- College Heights
- Wellesley Lower Falls

=== Climate ===
Wellesley has a warm-summer humid continental climate (Dfb under the Köppen climate classification system), with high humidity and precipitation year-round.

Climate data for Wellesley, Massachusetts
Month	Jan	Feb	Mar	Apr	May	Jun	Jul	Aug	Sep	Oct	Nov	Dec	Year
Record high °F (°C)	66 (19)	67 (19)	74 (23)	82 (28)	91 (33)	95 (35)	100 (38)	97 (36)	97 (36)	87 (31)	77 (25)	66 (19)	100 (38)
Mean daily maximum °F (°C)	33.6 (0.9)	34.7 (1.5)	43.4 (6.3)	54.9 (12.7)	66.4 (19.1)	74.7 (23.7)	80 (27)	78 (26)	70.9 (21.6)	60.5 (15.8)	48.9 (9.4)	37.4 (3.0)	57.0 (13.9)
Daily mean °F (°C)	26 (−3)	26 (−3)	33 (1)	42 (6)	53 (12)	62 (17)	68 (20)	66 (19)	60 (16)	50 (10)	39 (4)	30 (−1)	46 (8)
Mean daily minimum °F (°C)	18.3 (−7.6)	18.8 (−7.3)	27 (−3)	36.5 (2.5)	46.4 (8.0)	55.4 (13.0)	61.5 (16.4)	60.3 (15.7)	53.4 (11.9)	43.4 (6.3)	33.7 (0.9)	22.8 (−5.1)	39.8 (4.3)
Record low °F (°C)	−14 (−26)	−21 (−29)	−5 (−21)	6 (−14)	27 (−3)	31 (−1)	44 (7)	32 (0)	28 (−2)	20 (−7)	5 (−15)	−19 (−28)	−21 (−29)
Average precipitation inches (mm)	4.2 (110)	3.9 (99)	4.6 (120)	4.1 (100)	3.7 (94)	3.6 (91)	3.7 (94)	4.1 (100)	4 (100)	4 (100)	4.4 (110)	4.4 (110)	48.7 (1,228)
Average snowfall inches (cm)	16.1 (41)	16 (41)	12 (30)	3.1 (7.9)	0.1 (0.25)	0 (0)	0 (0)	0 (0)	0 (0)	0.3 (0.76)	2.7 (6.9)	11.7 (30)	62 (157.81)
Average precipitation days	12	11	13	12	12	12	11	10	9	10	11	12	135
Source 1: Climate Summary for Dedham, Massachusetts
Source 2: Monthly- All Data for Dedham, Massachusetts

== Demographics ==
Historical population
Year	Pop.	±%
1890	3,600	—
1900	5,072	+40.9%
1910	5,413	+6.7%
1920	6,224	+15.0%
1930	11,439	+83.8%
1940	15,127	+32.2%
1950	20,549	+35.8%
1960	26,071	+26.9%
1970	28,051	+7.6%
1980	27,209	−3.0%
1990	26,615	−2.2%
2000	26,613	−0.0%
2010	27,982	+5.1%
2020	29,550	+5.6%
2024*	31,242	+5.7%
* = population estimate. Source: United States Census records and Population Estimates Program data.

The Census Bureau has also defined the town as a census-designated place with an area exactly equivalent to the town.

As of the census of 2000, there were 26,613 people, 8,594 households, and 6,540 families residing in the town. The population density was 2,614.1 inhabitants per square mile (1,009.3/km^{2}). There were 8,861 housing units at an average density of 870.4 per square mile (336.1/km^{2}). According to a 2007 Census Bureau estimate, the racial makeup of the town was 84.6% White, 10.0% Asian, 2.2% Black, 0.01% Native American, 0.01% Pacific Islander, 1.4% from other races, and 1.7% from two or more races. Hispanic or Latino of any race were 3.4% of the population.

There were 8,594 households, out of which 39.9% had children under the age of 18 living with them, 67.2% were married couples living together, 7.1% had a female householder with no husband present, and 23.9% were non-families. 20.7% of all households were made up of individuals, and 10.5% had someone living alone who was 65 years of age or older. The average household size was 2.70 and the average family size was 3.14.

In the town, the population was spread out, with 25.1% under the age of 18, 13.9% from 18 to 24, 22.9% from 25 to 44, 24.2% from 45 to 64, and 13.9% who were 65 years of age or older. The median age was 38 years. For every 100 females, there were 77.9 males. For every 100 females age 18 and over, there were 71.1 males.

The median income for a household was $159,167, and the median income for a family was $186,518. The per capita income in the town was $72,046. About 2.4% of families and 3.8% of the population were below the poverty line, including 4.0% of those under age 18 and 2.1% of those age 65 or over.

In 2025 Wellesley was listed as the tenth most wealthy suburb in America.

== Economy ==
Wellesley is home to the headquarters of many local, national and global businesses including Benchmark Senior Living, Blank Label Apparel, Eagle Investment Systems, EPG Incorporated, GrandBanks Capital, Harvard Pilgrim Health Care, Livingston and Haynes PC, and Sun Life Financial U.S.

=== Top employers ===
According to Wellesley's 2023 Annual Comprehensive Financial Report, the top employers in the city were:

#	Employer	# of employees
1	Sun Life Financial	1,209
2	Wellesley College	1,172
3	Babson College	961
4	Harvard Pilgrim Health Care	434
5	Harvard Vanguard Medical Associates	351
6	Massachusetts Bay Community College	287
7	Dana Hall School	269
8	Whole Foods	241
9	Wellesley Country Club	227
10	Roche Bros.	222

The above figures do not include employees of the town itself, which included 1,322 full-time equivalent employees, 919 of which were school employee positions.

== Arts and culture ==
=== Historic district ===
The town designated Cottage Street and its nearby alleys as the historic district in its zoning plan. Most houses in this district were built around the 1860s and qualify as protected buildings certified by the town's historic commission.

=== Recent construction ===
The town's historic 19th-century inn was demolished to make way for condominiums and mixed-use development in 2006. The Wellesley Country Club clubhouse, which is the building where the town was founded, was demolished in 2008, and a new clubhouse was built. The town's pre-World War II high school building was torn down and replaced with a new high school finished in 2012. The entire 1960s-style Linden Street strip-mall has been replaced by "Linden Square"—a shopping district that includes a flagship Roche Bros. supermarket, restaurants, cafes, clothing stores, along with a mixture of national chains and local shops.

=== Library ===
Wellesley opened its new Free Library building in 2003, which is part of the Minuteman Library Network. Due to the structure of budget override votes and perhaps the size of the new main branch of the library, the two branch libraries—one in Wellesley Hills, which was purpose-built to be a branch library in the 1920s, another in Wellesley Fells—closed in the summer of 2006. The branch libraries reopened in September 2008. The main library branch near Wellesley Square underwent a major interior renovation in 2021.

== Government ==
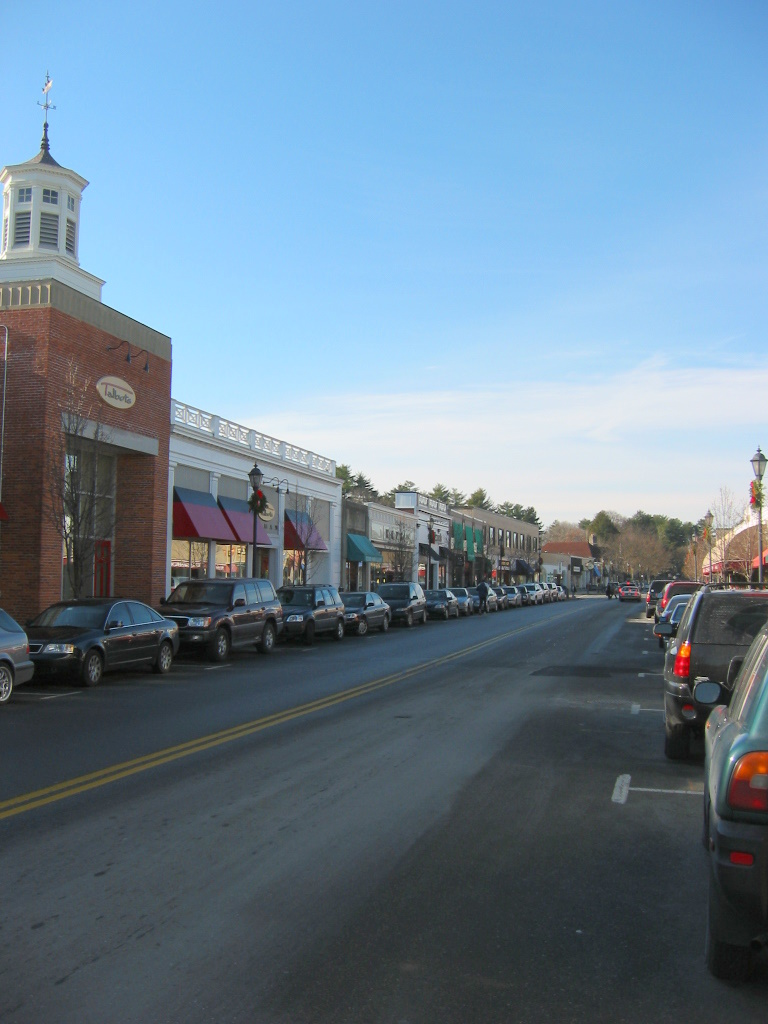
Central Street in Wellesley Square, looking west

The town was governed through an open town meeting after it was incorporated. In 1933, citizens approved a ballot question to adopt a representative town meeting government, dividing the town into four precincts with 60 representatives each. The new form of government came into effect in 1934. In 2016, citizens rejected a ballot question to adopt a Selectmen-Manager government.

The town is part of the Massachusetts Senate's Norfolk, Bristol and Middlesex district.

In 2010 Wellesley's Sustainable Energy Committee (SEC) was formed by Town Meeting. The committee's primary objective was a 10% town-wide reduction in Wellesley's carbon footprint and 20% reduction in carbon footprint for all municipal departments by the end of 2013. In 2014 Town Meeting voted to support a new goal of 25% reduction by 2020 using 2007 as the base year. The committee is responsible for Wellesley's adoption of the Massachusetts Stretch Building Code approved by Town Meeting effective January 2012.

== Education ==
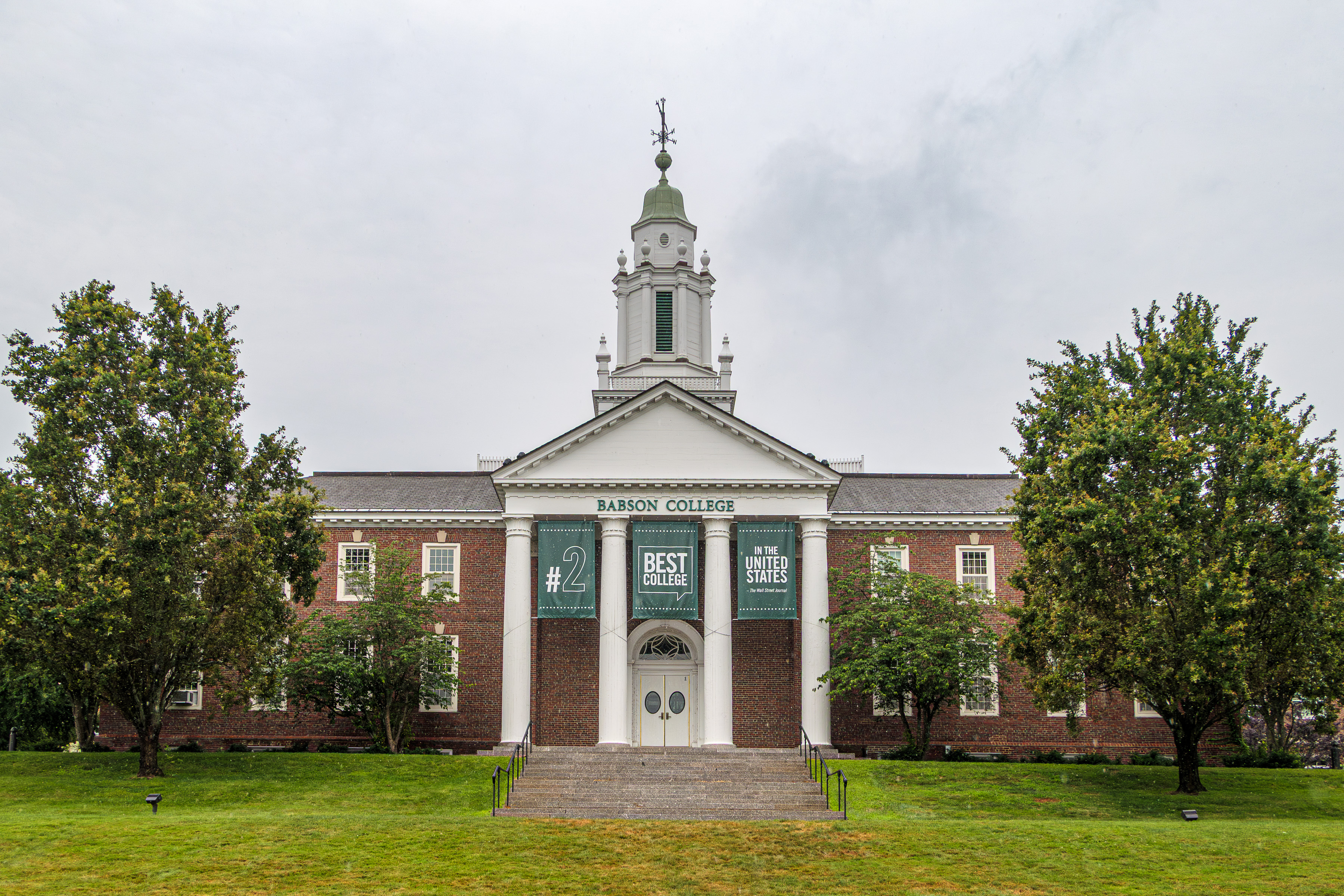
Babson College

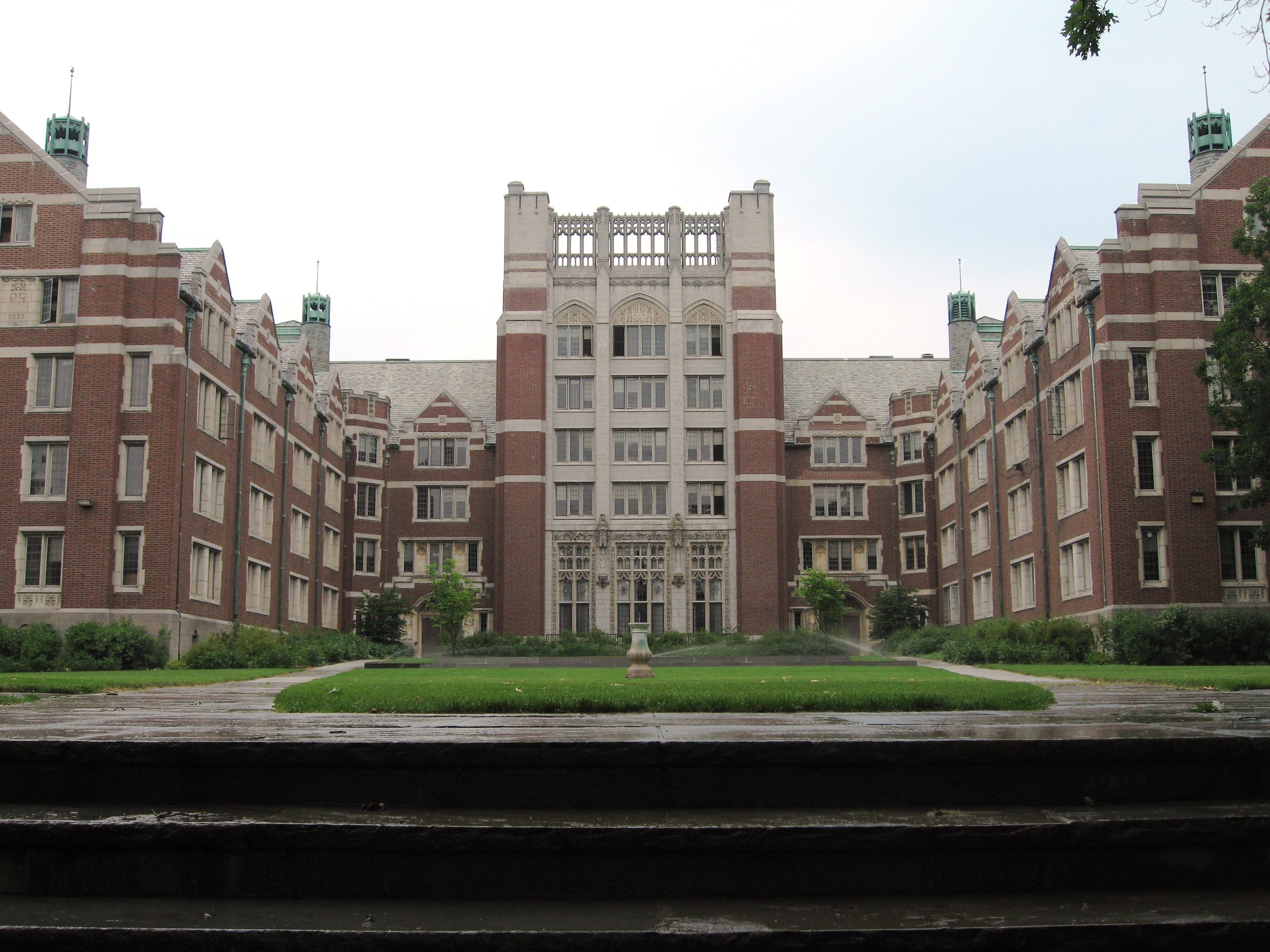
Wellesley College

The school system also contains a middle school and six elementary schools (Bates, Schofield, Fiske, Hardy, Hunnewell, and Sprague). Wellesley includes a primary and secondary school which are Wellesley Middle School (also known as Wellesley Junior High) and Wellesley High School, respectively; and are the home of the Raiders.

The town contains a private elementary school, Tenacre Country Day School, one private Catholic elementary school (St. John the Evangelist) and a preparatory school for girls, Dana Hall School. Also, the Wellesley A Better Chance outfit started in the early 1970s brings promising young women from underserved areas into town to attend Wellesley High School and live nearby.

Wellesley also contains the main campus of three colleges: Wellesley College, a women's liberal arts college, Massachusetts Bay Community College, a two-year public college, and Babson, a business college.

== Media ==
Events of significance to members of the Wellesley community are recorded in two local news publications: The Wellesley Townsman has been published since 1906, and The Swellesley Report since 2005. Both are available online and digitized copies of the paper-based Townsman are available from the Wellesley Free Library.

== Infrastructure ==
=== Transportation ===
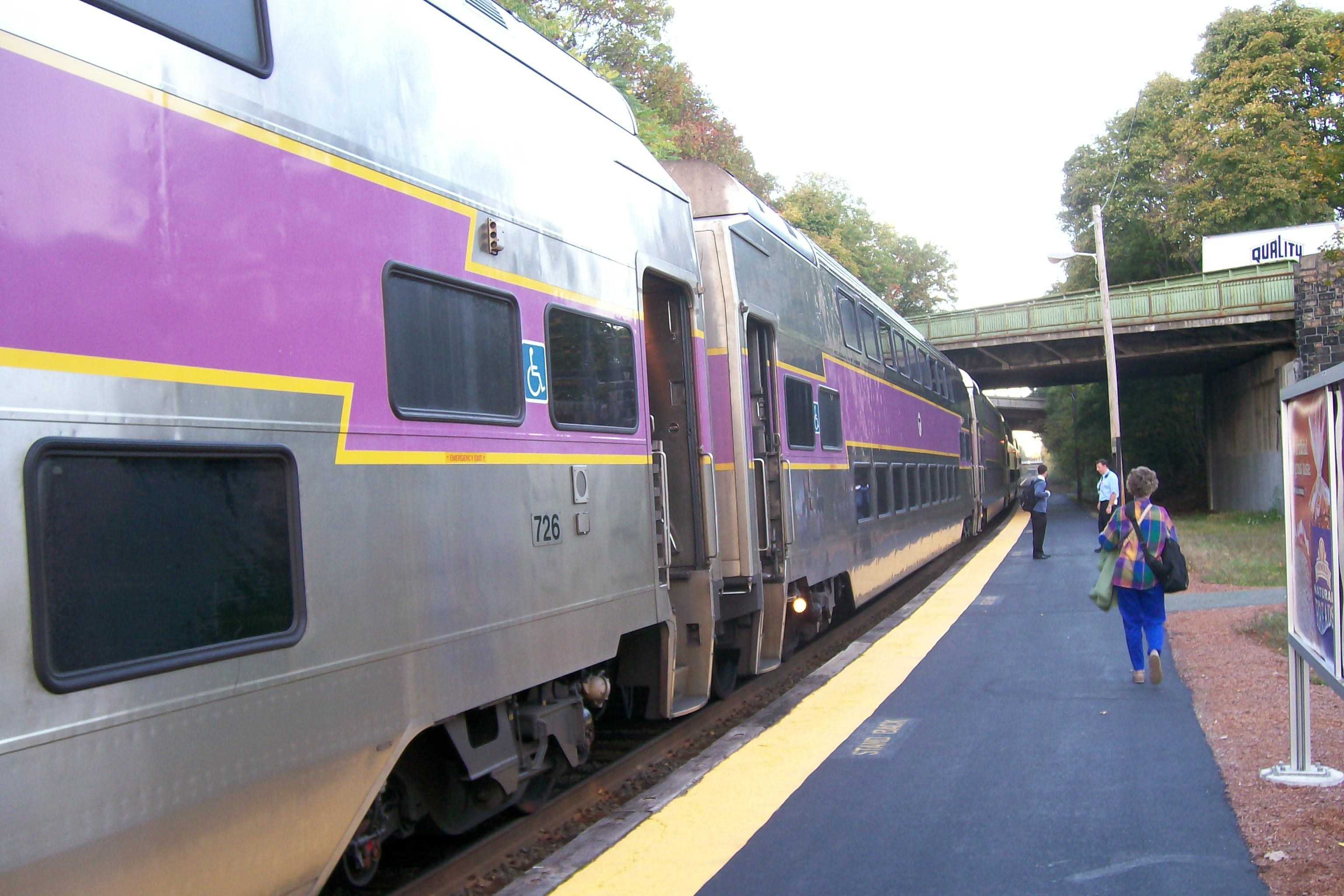
Commuter Rail train at Wellesley Hills

Wellesley has had rail service to Boston since 1833. Rail service is currently provided through Wellesley's participation in the MBTA, which offers a total of 17 weekdays Commuter Rail trains inbound towards Boston and outbound towards Framingham and Worcester. Wellesley's stations are (east to west) Wellesley Farms, Wellesley Hills, and Wellesley Square. The Wellesley Farms station is listed on the U.S. National Register of Historic Places. MWRTA bus service also runs along Walnut Street, Cedar Street, and Route 9.

The highways Interstate 95/Massachusetts Route 128, Massachusetts Route 9, Massachusetts route 16 (as Washington Street) and Massachusetts route 135 run through Wellesley.

=== Municipal light plant ===
Wellesley is serviced by the Wellesley Municipal Light Plant. The three colleges voluntarily pay a premium to purchase electricity generated by wind power.

In 2012, Wellesley was designated a Green Power Community by the United States Environmental Protection Agency.

== Notable people ==
- Danny Ainge, executive director of basketball operations and general manager of the Boston Celtics
- Ray Allen, former player for the Boston Celtics
- Emily Greene Balch, Nobel Peace Prize winner
- Roger Nash Baldwin, co-founder of American Civil Liberties Union
- Arthur Batcheller, U.S. radio inspector
- Katharine Lee Bates, author of "America the Beautiful"
- Gamaliel Bradford, poet, biographer
- Dee Brown, former basketball player for the Boston Celtics and NBA executive
- Laurence E. Bunker, United States Army colonel, aide to Gen. Douglas MacArthur, leader within the John Birch Society
- R. Nicholas Burns, former U.S. Under Secretary of State, Ambassador to NATO and to Greece, and State Department spokesman
- Karl E. Case, developer of the Case–Shiller index
- Dan Chiasson, poet and New Yorker critic
- Gene Clapp, Olympic silver medalist men's eight
- Katharine Coman, historian, professor of economics and sociology, author
- Greg Comella, former professional football player with the New York Giants, Titans, Texans and Buccaneers
- Jane Curtin, comedian, original cast member of Saturday Night Live
- Richard Darman, economist, former head of the Office of Management and Budget
- Erik Davis, former pitcher for the Washington Nationals
- Blake Dietrick, WNBA basketball player with the Seattle Storm and former standout with the Princeton Tigers
- Dennis Eckersley, former pitcher for the Oakland A's
- Nancy Hasty Evans, politician
- Carl Everett, former center fielder for the Boston Red Sox
- Isabel Fiske Conant, poet and playwright
- Nicole Freedman (born 1972), Olympic cyclist
- Nate Freiman (born 1986), first baseman for the Oakland Athletics
- Wendell Arthur Garrity Jr., U.S. District Court judge
- Curt Gowdy, sports commentator
- Michael S. Greco, president of American, Massachusetts, and New England bar associations
- Lester Grinspoon, psychiatrist, professor, and drug policy reform advocate
- Ariulf Eric Hampe, German electrical and aeronautical engineer
- Jay Harrington American actor
- Gordon Hayward, small forward for the Boston Celtics
- H. H. Hunnewell (1810–1902), railroad financier and horticulturist
- Andrea Jung, CEO of Avon Products
- Phil Laak, professional poker player, winner of 2004 World Poker Tour
- Christopher Leggett, film producer
- Xihong Lin, Department of Biostatistics chair at the Harvard School of Public Health
- Gregory Mankiw, Harvard economics professor
- Daisuke Matsuzaka, former pitcher for the Boston Red Sox
- Bijan Mazaheri, distance runner
- Fred McLafferty, professor, analytical chemist, author, inventor, leading developer of mass spectrometry
- Drew Meekins, figure skater
- Ossian Everett Mills, founder of Phi Mu Alpha Sinfonia fraternity
- Brian Moynihan, CEO of Bank of America
- Bill Mueller, former third baseman for the Boston Red Sox
- Joseph E. Murray, surgeon, winner of the Nobel Prize in Medicine, 1990
- Vladimir Nabokov, Russian-American author
- Joe Nash, retired NFL player for the Seattle Seahawks
- Sylvia Plath, poet and author, The Bell Jar
- Richard Preston and Douglas Preston, best-selling authors
- Aneesh Raman, former presidential speechwriter at the White House and CNN Middle East Correspondent
- Edward Thomas Ryan, president, American Society of Tropical Medicine and Hygiene; professor, Harvard University
- James St. Clair, defense lawyer for Richard Nixon during Watergate
- Jack Sanford, former MLB pitcher, 1957 MLB Rookie of the Year Award recipient
- Billy Squier, rock musician
- Brad Stevens, former head coach and current general manager of the Boston Celtics
- Biz Stone, Twitter co-founder
- Steven Tyler, rock musician, lived in Wellesley during the late 1990s and early 2000s
- Michael von Clemm, banker, anthropologist and founder of Canary Wharf
- Rasheed Wallace, retired professional basketball player
- Greg Yaitanes, Emmy Award-winning film director, writer, actor
- Eddie Yost, baseball player and coach
