= Wellesley Hills station =

Rail station in Wellesley, Massachusetts, US

Wellesley Hills
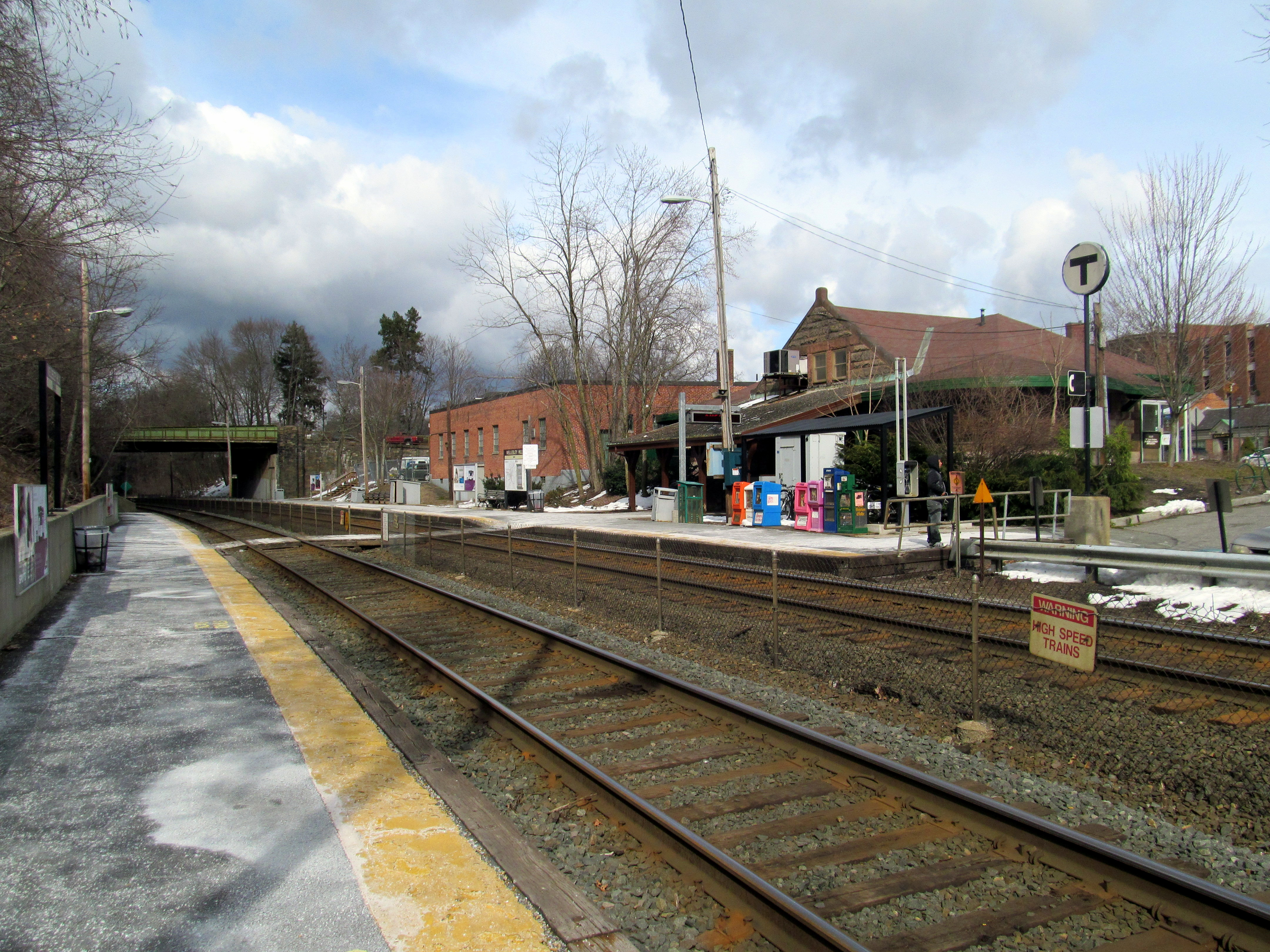
- Wellesley Hills station platforms; station building is at right

General information
- Location: 339 Washington Street; Wellesley, Massachusetts
- Coordinates: 42.3102°N 71.2770°W
- Line: Worcester Main Line
- Platforms: 2 side platforms
- Tracks: 2

Construction
- Parking: 55 spaces
- Accessible: No

Other information
- Fare zone: 3

History
- Opened: 1834
- Rebuilt: March 13, 1886

Passengers
- 2024: 301 daily boardings

Services
Preceding station	MBTA	Following station
Wellesley Square toward Worcester	Framingham/Worcester Line	Wellesley Farms toward South Station
Former services
Preceding station	New York Central Railroad	Following station
Wellesley toward Albany	Boston and Albany Railroad Main Line	Wellesley Farms toward Boston
Location

Wellesley Hills station is an MBTA Commuter Rail station in Wellesley, Massachusetts, United States. It serves the Framingham/Worcester Line. It is located off Washington Street (Route 16) in Wellesley, Massachusetts. Wellesley Hills has two low platforms serving the line's two tracks; it is not accessible. Designed in 1885 and completed in 1886, the station was the last of nine stations that H.H. Richardson designed for the Boston and Albany Railroad. It replaced a previous station, built in 1834 with the completion of the Boston and Worcester Railroad.

== History ==
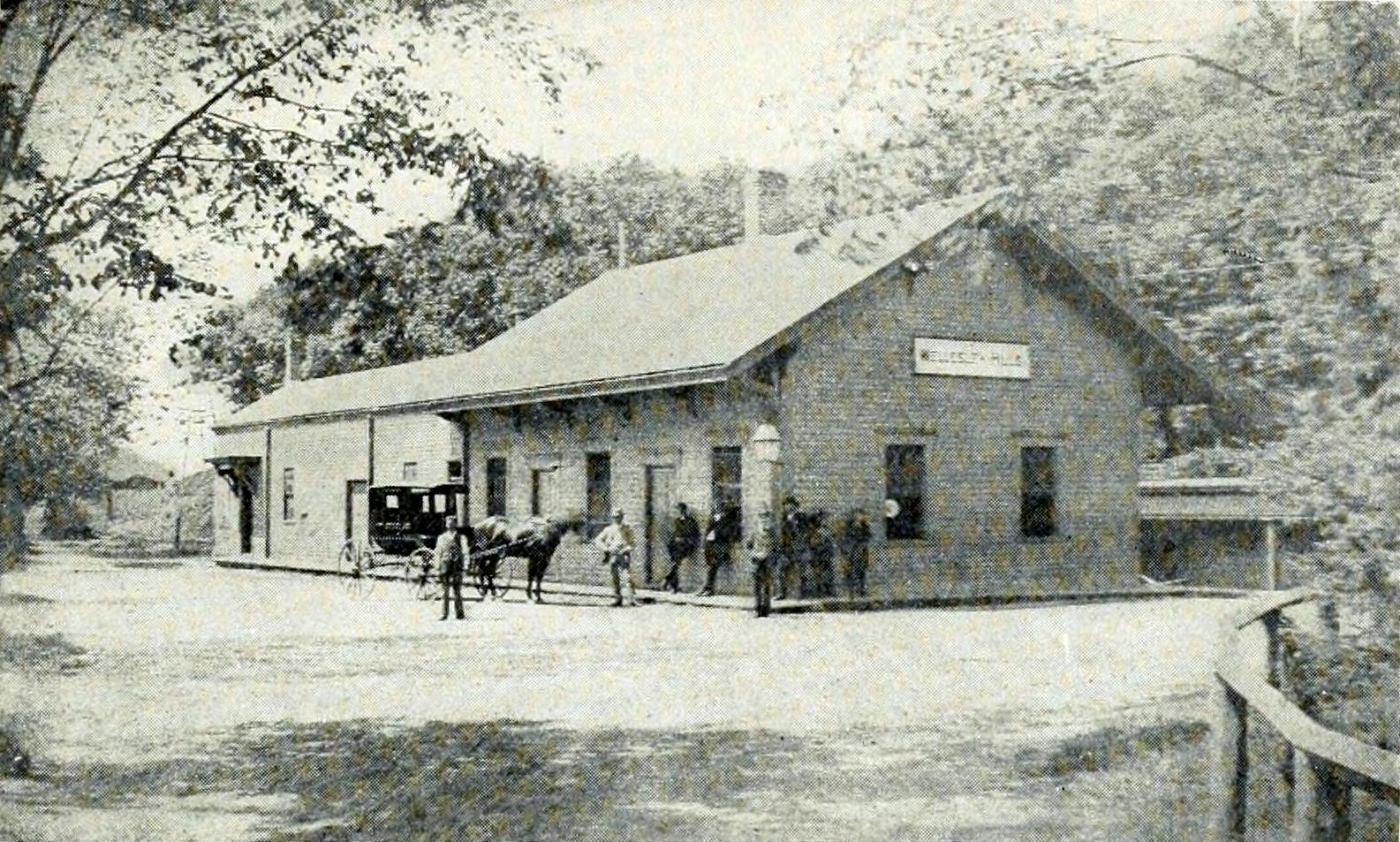
Wellesley Hills station, still with a Grantville sign, around 1884

The Boston & Worcester Railroad (B&W), extending outwards from Boston, reached through the West Parish of Needham in mid-1834. North Needham station (also called Needham) was the terminus for a few months while construction continued towards Worcester. In 1839, the line was double tracked through the area.

Around 1844, the railroad proposed to relocate the station building to West Needham, which had more population. A new station building was constructed there instead. Improvements were made to Needham station around 1846. It was later renamed Grantville, then briefly Nehoiden, and finally Wellesley Hills in 1881 when the West Parish was fully separated from Needham as the town of Wellesley.

Wellesley Hills station was designed by Henry Hobson Richardson in 1885 for the Boston & Albany Railroad, and was the last in a series of stations he designed, all featuring rough-cut light colored stone with dark stone trim around windows and doors, slate roofs, and varying amounts of decorative dark stone carvings. As a B&A station, it originally served both commuter trains in the Boston Metropolitan Area and long distance trains toward Albany, New York.

By 1962, the disused station building was converted to a dry cleaning shop, with large plate glass windows added to the façade. The previous station building, constructed in 1855, has been moved across the road and converted to a private residence.

In June 2021, the MBTA issued a $28 million design contract for a project to add a third track from Weston to Framingham, including reconstruction of the three Wellesley stations and West Natick station. The project was expected to cost around $400 million, of which rebuilding Wellesley Hills station would be $43–45 million, with completion in 2030. In 2024, the MBTA tested a temporary freestanding accessible platform design at Beverly Depot. These platforms do not require alterations to the existing platforms, thus skirting federal rules requiring full accessibility renovations when stations are modified, and were intended to provide interim accessibility at lower cost pending full reconstruction. In May 2024, the agency identified Wellesley Hills as a possible future location for the platform design. As of May 2026, design work is underway; the accessible platforms at Wellesley Hills are expected to be completed in 2027.
