= Boston bid for the 2024 Summer Olympics =

Bid to bring the Olympics to Boston

Bids for the 2024 Summer Olympics
Overview
- Games of the XXXIII Olympiad

Details
- City: Boston, Massachusetts, United States
- NOC: US Olympic Committee

Previous Games hosted
- None

Decision
- Result: Withdrawn

The Boston 2024 Partnership was a short-lived, privately funded bid to bring the 2024 Summer Olympics to the city of Boston, Massachusetts. The official proposal was submitted on September 12, 2014. On January 8, 2015, the United States Olympic Committee (USOC) chose Boston to compete with candidates around the world, and the International Olympic Committee (IOC) would select the host city in 2017.

Boston beat out Los Angeles, San Francisco, and Washington, DC for the official US bid. Boston was the only first-time bidder in the group. Polls conducted in early 2015 indicated declining support in the Boston area for hosting the Olympics. On July 27, 2015, the city and the USOC mutually agreed to terminate Boston's bid to host the Games.

== Bid history ==
In 2013, Boston was one of 35 cities invited by the USOC to explore the possibility of submitting a bid to host the 2024 Olympics. The Massachusetts State Senate passed a bill (filed by Lowell senator Eileen Donoghue) in July to create a feasibility commission to study this possibility. After then passing through the House of Representatives and receiving the signature of Governor Deval Patrick, the Feasibility Commission was formed that fall, with appointees from Governor Deval Patrick, Senate President Therese Murray, Speaker Robert DeLeo, Senate Minority Leader Bruce Tarr, House Minority Leader Bradley Jones, Jr., and Boston Mayor Marty Walsh. The Feasibility Commission was staffed with corporate executives (covering real estate/construction, tourism, and sports management) and political officials or their aides.

The commission released its final report on February 27, 2014, which identified possible venues, legacy opportunities, and security risks for the Games.

In January 2014, the leaders of the feasibility commission created the non-profit Boston 2024 Partnership. Suffolk Construction Company CEO John Fish, the chairman of the feasibility commission, became the treasurer, clerk, and director (then, later, chairman) of Boston 2024. Massachusetts Competitive Partnership CEO Daniel O’Connell, another appointee from the feasibility commission, became the president. New England Patriots owner Bob Kraft, Boston Celtics co-owner and Bain Capital executive Stephen Pagliuca, and Gloria Cordes Larson of Bentley were listed as directors. The Boston 2024 Partnership then put together an executive committee of local business leaders, university presidents, and athletes to develop the bid.

On June 13, 2014, Boston made the USOC's shortlist for the 2024 Games.

The bid was submitted to the USOC on December 1, 2014, but, at that point, there had been no open public meetings about the bid, nor had the bid been released to the public—points of continuing controversy that factored into the bid's ultimate demise.

On December 16, 2014, Mayor Marty Walsh joined the Boston 2024 Partnership to present before the USOC.

On January 8, 2015, the USOC selected Boston as its bidding city for the 2024 Olympic Games. To avoid criticisms of conflicts of interest, Boston 2024 chairman John Fish recused himself and Suffolk Construction Company from any Olympic-related bidding.

On January 21, 2015, Boston 2024 released a redacted version of the bid they submitted to the USOC. The full, unredacted version of the bid was not released until July 24, 2015, after the Boston City Council threatened to issue a subpoena to obtain them. The redactions included the mention of a $500 million shortfall, Boston 2024's willingness to get laws changed to suit the Olympics, and the Partnership's downplaying of Olympic opposition and the possibility of a voter referendum.

On January 23, 2015, former MassDOT Secretary Richard A. Davey was appointed CEO of the Boston 2024 Partnership, replacing Dan O'Connell, who remained a part of the executive committee.

On March 9, 2015, Boston 2024 released salary information for its staff as well as the details for how much it was paying various consultants. Boston 2024 was paying $124,000 a month to consulting firms, excluding the $7,500 a week that former Governor Deval Patrick was receiving as a bid ambassador.

On April 22, 2015, Boston 2024 announced a new 30-member board of directors, including celebrity athletes like Larry Bird, Jo Jo White, and Michelle Kwan, as well as members of the USOC.

On May 21, 2015, Stephen Pagliuca replaced John Fish as chairman of the Boston 2024 Partnership.

On June 15, 2015, Boston 2024 added 17 new members to its board of directors, including Olympic gold medalist Aly Raisman and former Boston mayor Raymond Flynn.

=== Funding ===
Acknowledging the overspending at past Olympics like publicly funded Beijing (China) and Sochi (Russia), the Boston 2024 Partnership announced that it would rely on private funds (with the exception of federal security spending), existing facilities and temporary venues, and transportation projects that had previously received approval.

In the budget released in January 2015, Boston 2024 included an operating budget of $4.7 billion, a development budget of $3.4 billion, and an infrastructure budget of $5.2 billion. Andrew Zimbalist, a sports economist at Smith College criticized these budget numbers for numerous omissions and overly optimistic assumptions.

In May, a public records request on an economic impact assessment of the bid commissioned by the Boston Foundation found that Boston 2024 planned to use tax increment financing for construction of the Olympic stadium, contradicting the group's earlier statements that no public funds would be used.

In mid-July 2015, the Boston Globe reported that Boston 2024 was experiencing difficulties in fundraising.

=== Potential venues ===
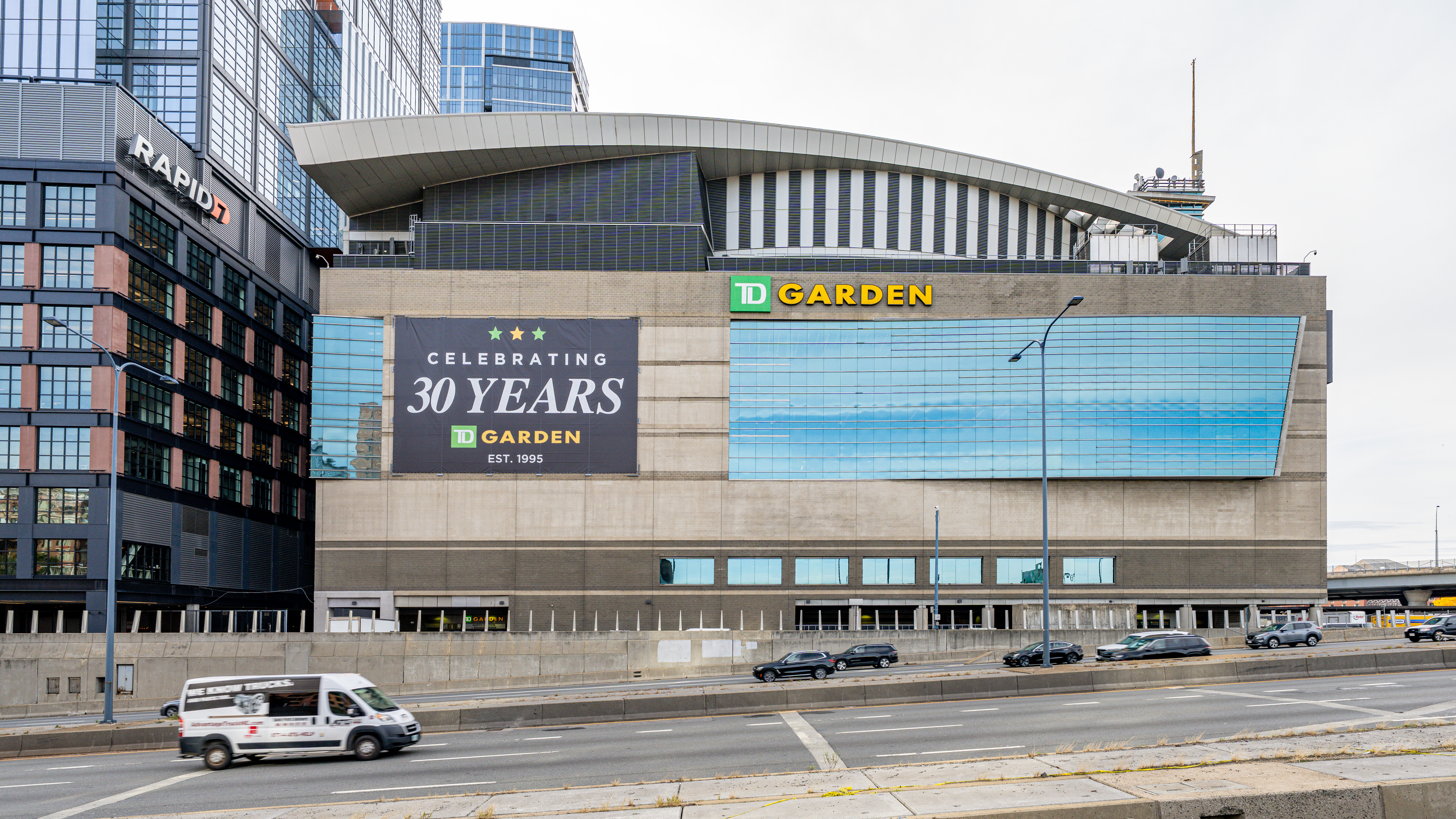
TD Garden was proposed for gymnastics and basketball finals.

The original bid leaned on the use of existing facilities at Boston-area universities as well as venues including Gillette Stadium and TD Garden. However, some events were pegged for other parts of the state, including rowing in the Merrimack River in Lowell.

Before Boston could host the Olympic Games, several facilities would need to be built: a temporary stadium to seat 60,000 people, an Olympic village that spans 100 acres, a velodrome, and an aquatics center.

Proposed 2024 Boston Olympics venues
Type	Venue	Location	Activities
E	Minute Man Sportsmen's Club	Billerica	Shooting
E	Agganis Arena (Boston University)	Boston	Badminton
E	Boston Convention Center	Boston (South Boston)	Judo, table tennis, taekwondo, volleyball, wrestling
E	Gillette Stadium	Foxborough	Soccer (finals), rugby sevens
E	Harvard Stadium (Harvard University)	Boston	Field hockey
E	TD Garden	Boston	Basketball (finals), gymnastics (artistic and trampoline)
E	Tsongas Center (UMass Lowell)	Lowell	Boxing
T	Assembly Square	Somerville	Velodrome
T	Beacon Park Yard	Boston	Aquatics, tennis
T	Boston Common	Boston	Beach volleyball
T	Connecticut River, Deerfield River	Deerfield and Westfield	Canoe, kayak
T	Franklin Park	Boston	Equestrian, modern pentathlon
T	Killian Court (MIT)	Cambridge	Archery
T	Olympic Stadium	Boston (Widett Circle)	Multi-sport (60,000 seats)
T	Nashoba Valley Ski Area	Westford	Mountain biking
P	Media Center	Boston Convention Center	Press and media reporting
T	Merrimack River	Lowell	Rowing
T/P	Olympic Village	Boston (Bayside Expo)	Athlete housing (16,000 beds)

Type key: E = existing facility, P = new, permanent, T = new, temporary

From the start, Boston 2024's venue selection was dogged by missteps. When the redacted bid book was released in January, property owners in and around designated venues, particularly Widett Circle (Olympic stadium) and Columbia Point (Olympic Village) alleged that they had never been contacted directly by Boston 2024. In March, Friends of the Public Garden released a formal statement opposing the siting of beach volleyball in Boston Common. The Franklin Park Coalition criticized Boston 2024 for not providing detailed information about their plans for the park.

On June 29, 2015, Boston 2024 released a revised Bid 2.0, with new cost estimates, some new venue locations, and plans for post-Olympic development in Widett Circle and Columbia Point. Notable venue changes included moving beach volleyball to Squantum Point Park and tennis to Harambee Park. Sailing was moved to New Bedford and shooting to Billerica. Locations for eight of the 33 venues, including big-ticket items like the velodrome, the aquatics center, and the media center, were left unidentified. The reception from residents near Squantum Point Park was mixed to negative at a community meeting in early July.

Massachusetts Governor Charlie Baker, Senate President Stan Rosenberg, and Speaker of the House Robert DeLeo commissioned consulting firm the Brattle Group to conduct a study of Bid 2.0, to be capped at $250,000. On August 18, 2015, Massachusetts Governor Charlie Baker released the results of the study, which found that Boston 2024 Partnership may have underestimated costs by up to $3 billion. The firm found that some of the biggest unaccounted for costs would come from contingency funds and incentives needed to entice developers to bid on the massive construction projects at Widett Circle and Columbia Point. The Brattle Group report estimated those combined costs could range up to $1 billion.

=== Transportation improvements ===
The Boston bid relied on several transportation system improvements, most already approved by the state legislature but not yet fully funded, These included:

- Expansion of South Station, adding 6 or 7 new platforms on land freed up by relocating the adjacent Post Office facility
- A new West Station on the Framingham Worcester commuter rail line to be constructed on the Beacon Park Yard property, coordinated with reconfiguration of the Massachusetts Turnpike Allston toll barrier plaza.
- Pedestrian improvements at the JFK/UMass Red Line station
- Purchase of diesel multiple unit (DMU) rail cars for the proposed Indigo Lines, which would shuttle visitors from hotels in Back Bay to the Boston Convention Center venue
- A bicycle path between the Olympic Stadium and the Olympic Village

According to a Boston Globe review, six projects, totaling $2.35 billion, had already been funded. Another six projects with a total cost of $5.16 billion had $1 billion committed to them, with a resulting gap of $4.16 billion. Five additional projects, with a total cost of $343 million, had no funds committed.

== Opposition ==
Boston's bid for the 2024 Olympics attracted an engaged and vocal opposition. In December 2013, around the same time as the state's Feasibility Commission launched, the group No Boston Olympics was formed. In November 2014, another group, No Boston 2024, emerged. No Boston 2024 focused on the social injustices inherent to the modern Olympic process, including displacement, militarization, widening inequality, and the diversion of public spending from basic needs. Although the groups differed in tactics, tone, and emphases, they frequently collaborated around the common goal of defeating the city's Olympic bid. No Boston 2024 was able to shine light on the city's behind-the-scenes work on the bid through numerous public records requests.

Former gubernatorial candidate Evan Falchuk, of the United Independent Party, was an early critic of the bid and launched a campaign for a ballot initiative barring public spending on the Olympics.

Although support for the Olympic bid in the Boston area was at 55% to 33% in early post-selection polling, it fell significantly in subsequent months as residents learned more about what hosting the Olympics would entail and grew increasingly skeptical of Boston 2024's promises that no public funding would be used. In February, Boston area support had fallen to 44%, with 46% opposed. Starting in March until the bid's demise, opposition consistently polled over 50%.

=== No Boston Olympics ===
No Boston Olympics was a grassroots organization started by Liam Kerr, Chris Dempsey, and Kelley Gossett in late 2013 in opposition to Boston 2024. No Boston Olympics highlighted the economic risks associated with hosting the Olympics, arguing that members of the Greater Boston community would be negatively impacted if the city were to move forward with its attempt to host the games. The group and its organizers have been credited with playing an instrumental role in influencing the USOPC's July 2015 decision to withdraw Boston's bid from consideration by the International Olympic Committee (IOC).

==== Background ====
No Boston Olympics started as an informal conversation between Liam Kerr and Chris Dempsey in Kerr's Beacon Hill, Boston living room in November 2013. At the time, Boston was listed among a number of cities in the United States under consideration to be the United States Olympic & Paralympic Committee (USOPC)'s bid to host the Olympic Games in 2024. Kerr, Dempsey, and others were concerned about the potential harmful consequences that hosting the Olympics might have for residents of the city and its economy. The pair formed No Boston Olympics along with Kerr's friend, Conor Yunits, in response to growing public advocacy by the Boston 2024 Committee, which promoted the city's host bid.

In June 2014, the USOPC announced that Boston had made its shortlist of potential U.S. host cities for the summer 2024 games. After connecting with Kerr and voicing similar concerns about the financial impact of hosting the Olympics in Boston, Kelley Gossett joined No Boston Olympics as a fourth co-chair. During this early period, the group focused much of its effort on working to convince the USOPC not to choose Boston as its 2024 bid and calling on the Boston 2024 Committee to share more information about its proposal.

In December 2014, Yunits parted ways with the group and announced that he had since become a supporter of Boston's bid to host the 2024 Olympics. Later that month, the USOPC made the formal announcement that it would make a bid to host the 2024 Olympics.

On January 8, 2015, the USOPC announced that it had officially selected Boston as its candidate to host the 2024 Olympic games. In response to the decision, No Boston Olympics announced that it would continue to oppose the bid while also pursuing a new set of objectives related to improving its substance, including:

- Arguing that the City of Boston should be protected from having to pay expenses incurred because of budget shortfalls resulting from the bid
- Calling on Boston 2024 to provide complete audit access to "an independent watchdog organization" for at least a year past the conclusion of the 2024 games
- Encouraging Boston 2024 to withhold a $600 million payment to the USOPC (which was intended to cover marketing expenses during the six-year window leading up to the 2024 Olympics) until after the games

Despite No Boston Olympics' continued opposition to Boston's 2024 bid, Dempsey suggested that the group would be "a lot more comfortable" with the prospect of hosting if its objectives were fulfilled.

On January 14, 2014, No Boston Olympics hosted a public meeting with Andrew Zimbalist, a professor of economics at Smith College in Northampton, Massachusetts and a vocal critic of Boston's bid to host the Olympics. A week later, WBUR-FM and MassINC released their first poll on the issue, demonstrating that 51% of Boston-area residents supported their city's bid to host the Olympics — while 33% opposed it. By the time WBUR and MassINC released their final poll on the matter in July 2015, support among Boston-area residents had dipped to 40% and opposition had risen to 53%.

Finally, on July 14, 2015, Boston Mayor Marty Walsh announced that he could not sign the USOPC's required Host City Contract, citing insufficient public support for Boston's 2024 bid. By early afternoon the same day, the USOPC had announced that it would formally withdraw Boston as its bid. According to USOPC chief executive Scott Blackmun, the decision was made because they had "not been able to get a majority of the citizens of Boston to support hosting the 2024 Olympic and Paralympic Games."

==== Aftermath ====
No Boston Olympics and its organizers have been credited with playing a critical role in defeating Boston's 2024 Olympic bid.

In 2017, Chris Dempsey and Andrew Zimbalist published a book about the No Boston Olympics movement titled No Boston Olympics: How and Why Smart Cities are Passing on the Torch.

Local media questioned what future political roles the founders would pursue. In 2021, Chris Dempsey launched a campaign for Massachusetts State Auditor in 2022 and won the endorsement of the Massachusetts Democratic Party at the convention in 2022. However, he was defeated in the primary by Diana DiZoglio. Liam Kerr founded Welcome PAC, which supports Democratic candidates in swing districts. Kelley Gossett went on to work for Uber and Airbnb.

== Boston City Council ==
Soon after Boston was selected as the United States' candidate city, the Boston City Council established a special committee to assess the bid.

In January 2015 (days after Boston was selected to be the United States' candidate city), City Councilor Michelle Wu published an op-ed on WGBH's website in which she called for there to her greater public transparency about the bid's details, and expressed hope that the city could potentially host, "a walkable Olympics leveraging university facilities and private sponsorships, instead of public funding, to produce economic opportunities, affordable housing, and time on the world stage." While she expressed some optimism that an Olympic Games held in the city could be successful, she also argued that there needed to be public input, and criticized the fact that the bid that had been presented to the USOC had not been released to the public.W Her op-ed outlined steps she argued would bring heightened public transparency and input to the bid. Wu argued that greater transparency and public input would also benefit the bid's likelihood of prevailing before the IOC, as it would have the benefit of increasing the city's assessment score IOC on the criteria of local support for the bid. By March 2015, however, Wu had grown more critical of the city's bid, and remarked during hearings on the bid that, "Boston doesn't need to host the Olympics to be a world-class city." During a hearing in May 2015, Wu expressed concern that the city would be violating the Boston City Charter if it signed an agreement to pay for cost overruns related to hosting the games. Wu argued that she believed that the charter required for all municipal appropriations to be for specified amounts, and that agreeing to provide an unlimited guarantee to pay for all overruns would violate that.

In February 2015, City Councilor Josh Zakim introduced a city council resolution that would have added four non-binding municipal referendum questions about the bid to the city's bid to the city's November 2015 municipal election ballot. At the time, Zakim described himself as "open-minded" about the prospect of hosting the Olympics, describing his proposed referendum not as an effort to oppose the bid but as an effort, " to get the information we need to decide if we should [host the Olympics]." The questions would have asked voters whether the City of Boston should:

- Host the Games
- Commit public money to support the Olympics
- Make financial guarantees to cover cost overruns
- Use eminent domain to take private land on behalf of the Games

Zakim renewed his efforts in March 2015, after the bid committee said it would only continue its effort if it had public support.

In March 2015, City Councilor Ayanna Pressley declared herself to be undecided on whether she supported or opposed the bid. She expressed concern over the lack of details available, and called for the bid committee to release detailed plans on its vision for hosting the games in order to allow for thorough analysis. She additionally made a specific call for the committee to release a diversity and inclusion plan covering both bidding process and the hosting of a potential games, as well as a plan on comprehensive strategies to combat sex trafficking during the prospective games in Boston.

In July 2015, City Councilor Tito Jackson criticized the bid committee for its failure to release the bid it had presented to the USOC, and attempted to pressure them into producing that document.

After the collapse of Boston's bid, the organization No Boston Olympics endorsed Jackson, Pressley, Zackim, and Wu for reelection in the 2015 Boston City Council election, praising them for "Demonstrat[ing] leadership by asking tough questions" to the leaders behind Boston's Olympic bid. The group similarly endorsed Cambridge City Council members Leland Cheung, Nadeem Mazen, and Timothy J. Toomey Jr. for reelection in 2015.

== Charlie Baker administration ==
On the same day Massachusetts Governor Charlie Baker was inaugurated for his first term, the U.S. Olympic Committee announced that it was selecting Boston's bid to host the 2024 Summer Olympics for submission to the International Olympic Committee. Baker released a statement welcoming the announcement, while also saying that he was "looking forward to working with Mayor Walsh and the Boston 2024 organization to address the multitude of issues that need to be discussed, including keeping costs down and continuing to press forward on pledges of a privately funded Olympics as the process moves forward before the IOC." In June 2015, amidst declining public support and organized opposition to the bid, Baker and the leadership of the state legislature commissioned an independent analysis of the potential impacts of hosting the games performed by the Cambridge-based consulting firm The Brattle Group.

Despite the U.S. Olympic Committee and the bid organizers mutually agreeing to drop the bid the previous month, the Brattle Group completed and released its report in August 2015. The report found that the bid organizers had underestimated the construction costs for the games' venues by $970 million (which the bid organizers had only estimated to be $918 million), had underestimated the costs to upgrading the MBTA's power and signaling systems by as much as $1.3 billion, and underestimated the costs for the proposed Olympic Stadium in Widett Circle by as much as $240 million. The report also noted that hosting the games would not have increased the state workforce or the state GDP by even one percent over the six years in preparation for and during the year of hosting the games. Based upon the report's analysis of the financial risks to taxpayers, Baker stated that he "would not have been able or willing to provide the guarantees the [United States Olympic Committee] was looking for from the commonwealth of Massachusetts", and doubted that the leadership of the state legislature would have been willing to do so either.

== Withdrawal of bid ==
On July 27, 2015, United States Olympic Committee CEO Scott Blackmun and Boston 2024 Chairman Steve Pagliuca issued a joint statement that officially ended the city's Olympic bid. Rumors that the USOC might pull Boston's bid had been swirling since late March due to low polling numbers and continued interest by Los Angeles in hosting.

After release of a revised bid on June 29, 2015, failed to effect a change in Boston 2024's polling numbers, and with the September 15 IOC deadline looming, the USOC put increasing pressure on Mayor Marty Walsh and Governor Charlie Baker to help boost the bid's popularity. Baker, who along with the state legislature had commissioned an economic analysis of the bid, held a press conference on July 24, 2015, to reassert that he did not intend to take a position on the bid until after the release of the commissioned report. The following Monday, with rumors swirling that the USOC would vote on terminating the bid that afternoon, Mayor Marty Walsh held a press conference asserting that, despite the fact that he had already signed a letter the previous October stating that he would sign the Host City Contract without reservation, he was not comfortable signing the financial guarantee in its current form at that time. The USOC voted to terminate the bid that afternoon in mutual agreement with the City of Boston.

On September 1, 2015, the USOC formally named Los Angeles as the US's bidding city for the 2024 Summer Olympics. Los Angeles will host the 2028 Summer Olympics while Paris hosted the 2024 Summer Olympics.

Although the Boston 2024 Partnership was over $4 million in debt after the bid was pulled, it officially settled its debts by the end of September 2015.

A poll of Boston residents taken in July 2016 showed that 44 percent thought the Boston Olympics would have been a good thing for the city, but slightly more (48 percent) disagreed. The poll results were identical to polls from July 2015, weeks before the bid ultimately collapsed.

On the occasion of the opening ceremony of the eventual 2024 Summer Olympics in Paris, former bid committee members met at Ford Tavern in Medford for a watch party, where they discussed the Boston bid and reminisced on what could have been the bid's impact "on important issues in Boston and Massachusetts, including transportation, housing and resiliency."

== See also ==
- United States bids for the Olympic Games
