= United Baseball League (proposed) =

Proposed third major league

- Sport: Baseball
- Founded: 1994
- Ceased: 1996
- Countries: United States; Canada

The United Baseball League, also known simply as the United League (UL), was a planned third major league that was formed in 1994, but folded in 1996 without playing a game.

== Formation ==
First announced on November 1, 1994, the UL founders were Bob Mrazek, a former five-term Congressman from Long Island; John Bryant, a Congressman from Dallas; Richard Moss, a player agent, and Andrew Zimbalist, an economist at Smith College. The UL originally planned to have ten teams, eight in the U.S. and one each in Canada and Mexico.

By August 1995, the league introduced former Texas Rangers president Mike Stone as its CEO, and former star Curt Flood as its commissioner. "We need an alternative league," Flood said. "America deserves an alternative league. I wish there was one when I played. Baseball's owners have shut me out for 25 years." Eight franchises were announced, seven in the U.S. and one in Canada.

== Announced franchises ==
Eastern Division	Proposed or presumed home field
Central Florida	Osceola County Stadium in Kissimmee
New York Kongs	Suffolk County Community College (proposed)
Puerto Rico	Hiram Bithorn Stadium in San Juan
Washington, D.C.	RFK Stadium
Western Division	Proposed or presumed home field
Los Angeles Blaze	Los Angeles Memorial Coliseum
New Orleans	Superdome
Portland, Oregon	Civic Stadium
Vancouver	BC Place

== Further developments ==
The league also announced a twenty-year TV contract with Liberty Sports and a 154-game schedule to begin March 28, 1996. Co-founder Richard Moss said the plan was for the UL to expand to 16 teams, including Japan and Korea, within three years.

Mike Casey, identified as the owner of the New Orleans franchise, announced former big-leaguer Paul Blair would be the club's assistant general manager. Casey's son-in-law, former Boston Red Sox pitching prospect Ed Riley, became the first signing for the proposed club; later, reports indicated the team had offered the disgraced Pete Rose $500,000 a year to serve as its manager.

By December 1995, Dick Moss announced that the league had been put off until 1997. (By January 1996, Casey's franchise was apparently located not in New Orleans but in Worcester, Massachusetts; Riley turned up in the "transactions" column of sports pages nationwide as being acquired by the Albany-Colonie Diamond Dogs of the Northeast League "from Worcester of the United Baseball League".) In late January 1996, Casey identified the UL's eight teams as Washington, Orlando, Bridgeport, Connecticut and his Worcester club in the Northern Division, with Los Angeles, San Juan, New Orleans and Austin, Texas in the Southern Division. Finally, on April 12, 1996, the league ceased operations, citing stadium problems. Also, Liberty Sports had merged with the Fox Television Network, who promptly announced a deal with Major League Baseball starting in 1997.
