= Widett Circle =

Roadway and industrial area in Boston

Coordinates: 42.3360°N 71.0625°W

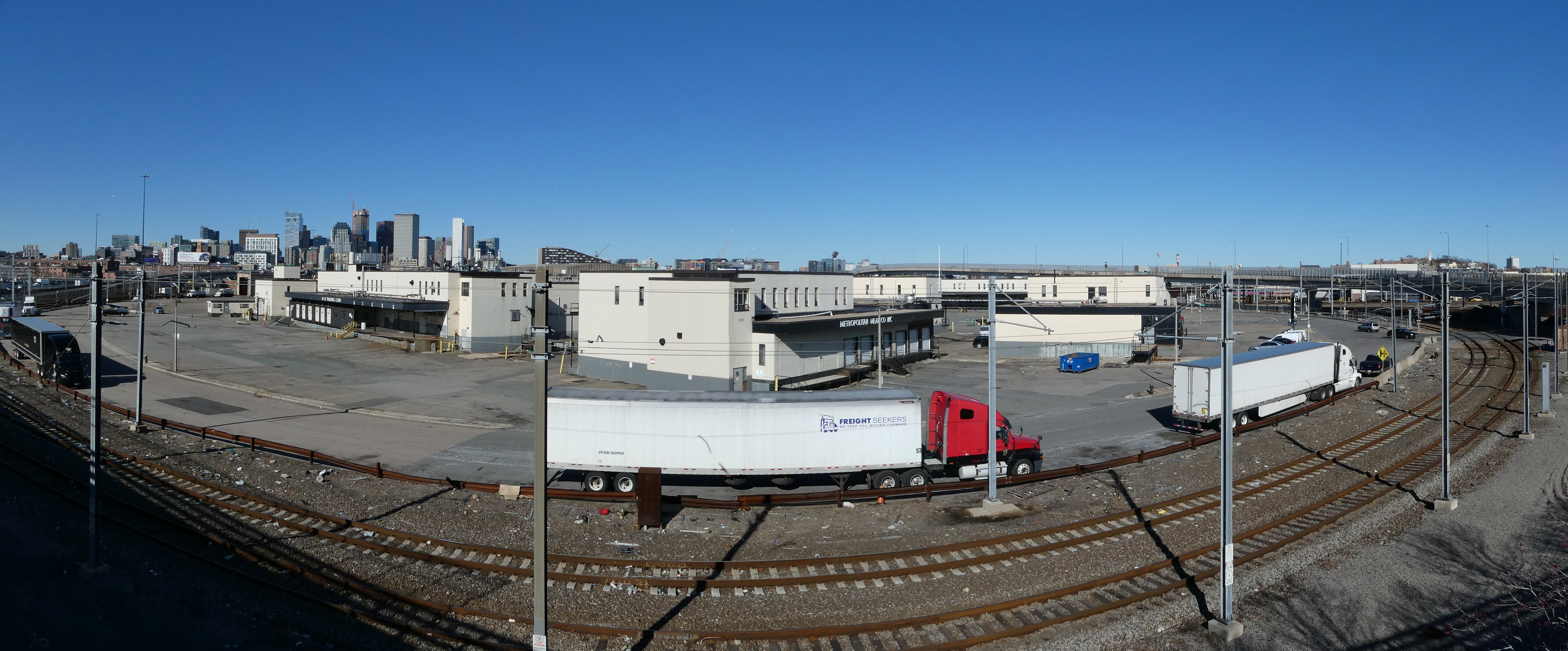
Panorama of Widett Circle in March 2022

Widett Circle is an industrial site in Boston, Massachusetts, located between the South Boston and South End neighborhoods. It is situated between a bend in Interstate 93 and various rail yards, near the Massachusetts Avenue connector to I-93. Long used as a wholesale food market, it is being converted to an MBTA Commuter Rail layover yard. Widett Circle was named for Harold Widett, who was an attorney for a meat packers union.

Two railroad tracks encircle Widett Circle and form a loop, which is used by Amtrak to turn trains around. Amtrak uses a train wash shed located on the loop to wash trains. In addition, multiple rail yards and maintenance facilities are adjacent to Widett Circle, including Amtrak's Southampton Street Yard, Amtrak's Front Yard, and MBTA's South Side Service and Inspection Facility.

Proposed uses for the site have included:

- An additional rail layover for the Massachusetts Bay Transportation Authority (MBTA)
- A trash recycling and transfer facility
- A new 28,000-seat stadium for the New England Revolution soccer team, on a city-owned parcel between Widett Circle and I-93
- A floodable watershed
- The main stadium for the Boston bid for the 2024 Summer Olympics (which was abandoned in 2015 due to popular opposition)

In December 2022, the MBTA Board authorized the agency to negotiate to purchase the property for use as a layover yard. The purchase price is expected to be around $200 million, with construction expected to take three years. The new yard will likely include provisions for building an air rights project in the future and may reduce the need for layover facility at the former Beacon Park Yard in Allston. The MBTA took possession of the property in April 2023. Amtrak was also interested in laying over trains at Widett Circle.

In October 2025, funding for the first phase of Widett Circle construction was included in bonds backed by "Fair Share" tax revenues. It includes demolition of existing structures, environmental remediation, elevating the site by 5 feet (1.5 m) to avoiding flooding, and construction of a six-track layover facility for electric Fairmount Line trains. As of September 2026, construction is expected to take place from March 2027 to March 2029, with the facility entering service in August 2029. Two further phases are planned to add 20 more tracks and a crew/administration building.
