= Harvard University's expansion in Allston, Massachusetts =

Land parcel in Boston

Coordinates: 42.364°N 71.122°W

Harvard in Allston

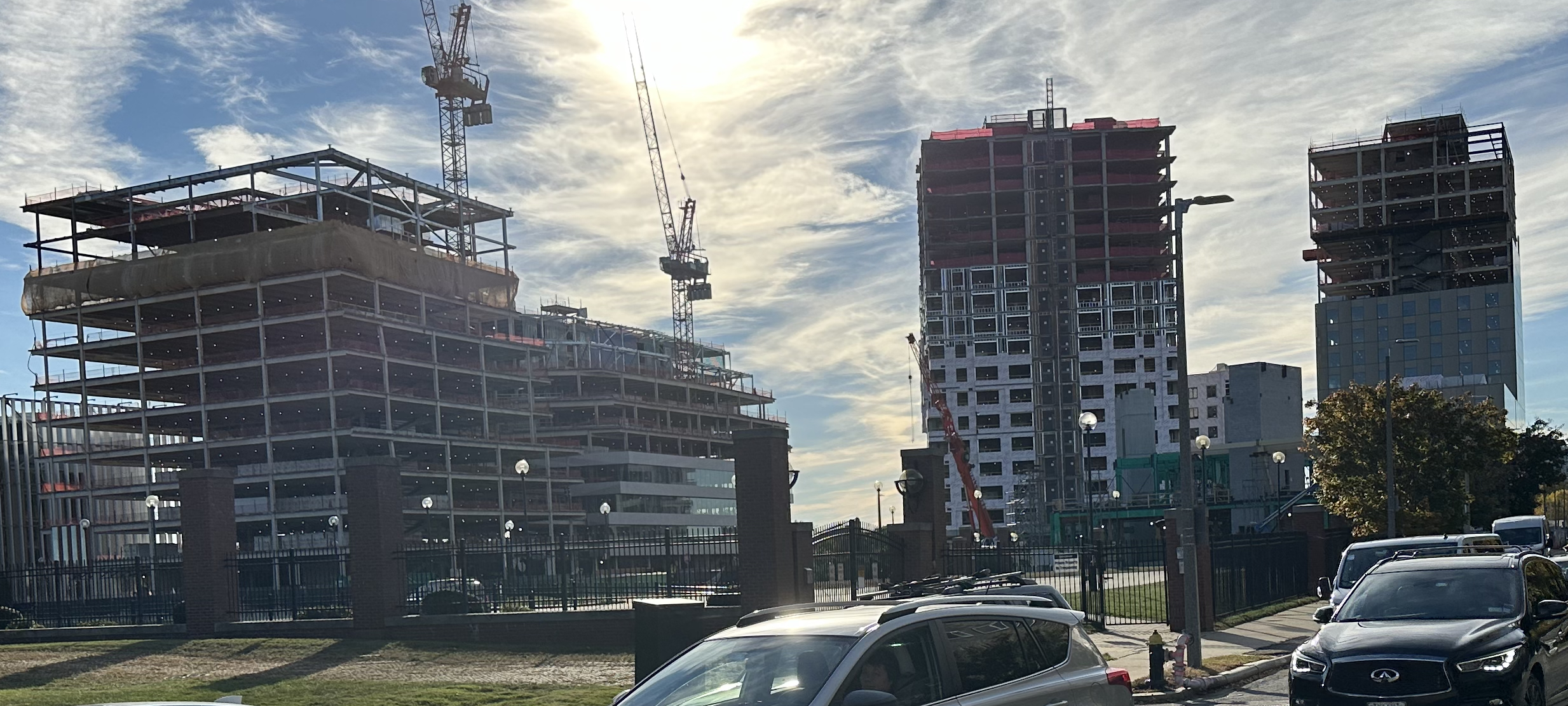
Enterprise Research Campus under construction in 2024

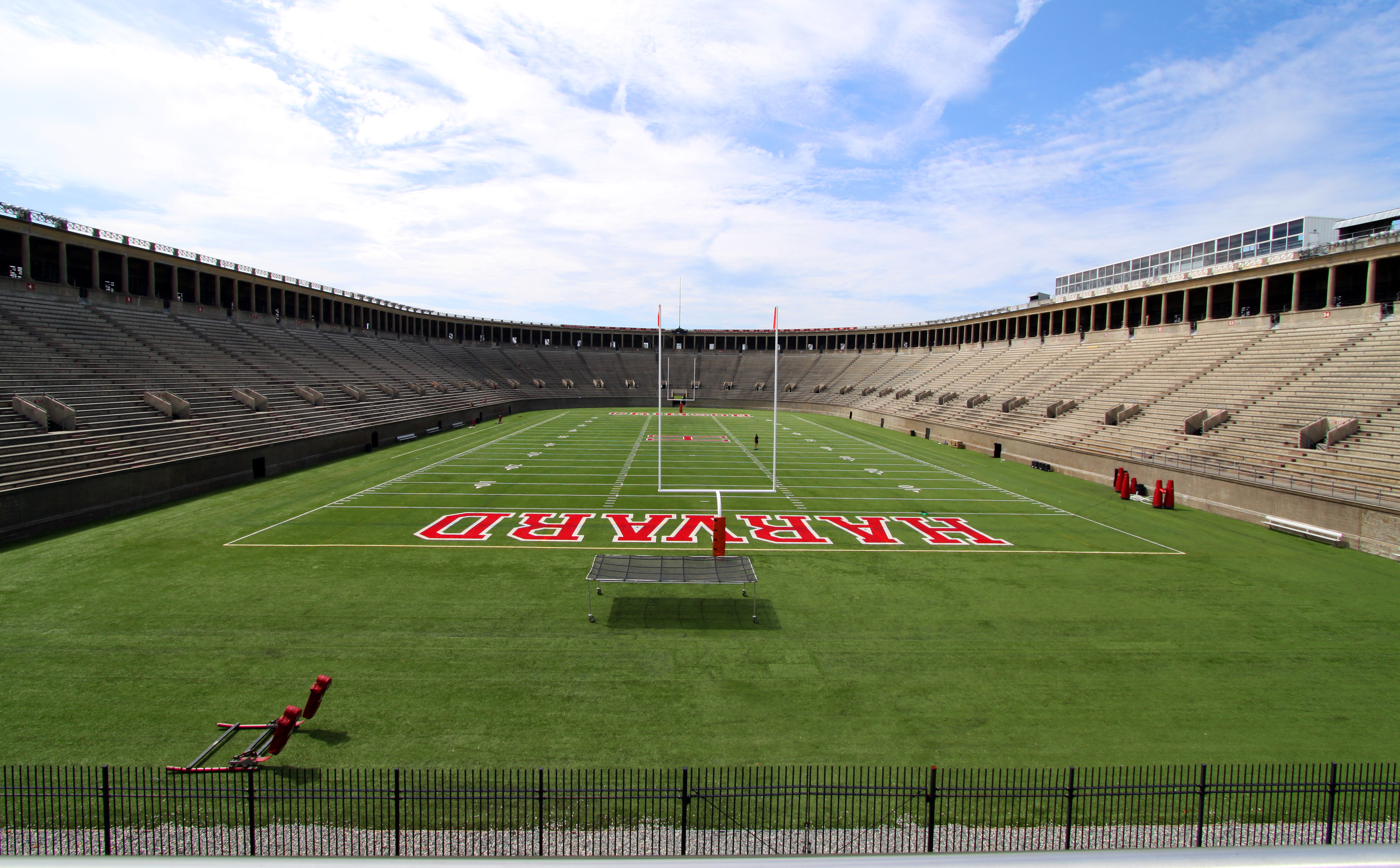
Harvard Stadium

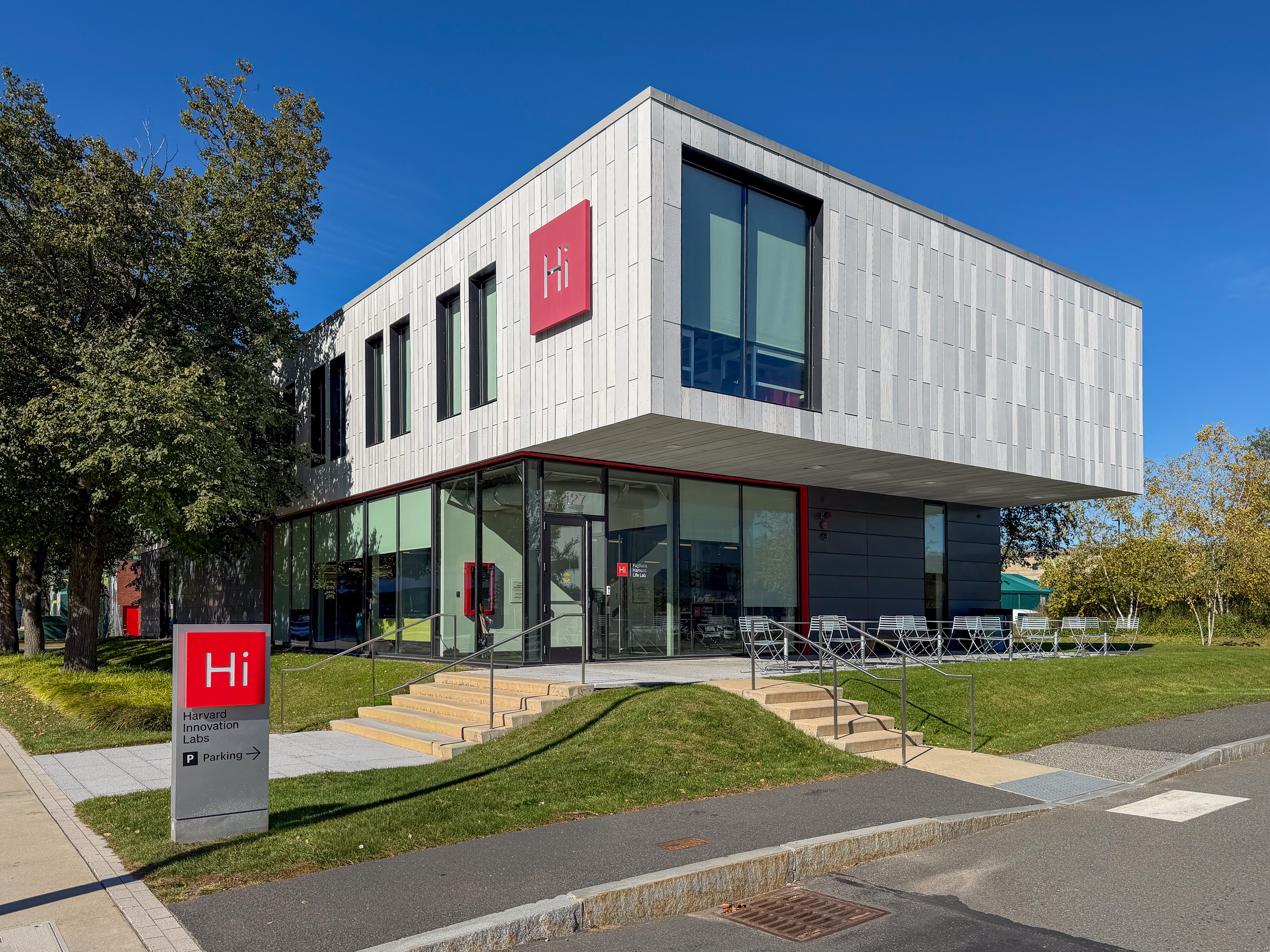
Harvard Innovation Labs, 127 Western Avenue

In December 2024, Harvard University announced a major expansion in Allston, Massachusetts. The Harvard Business School and many of the university's athletics facilities, including Harvard Stadium, are located on a 358-acre (145 ha) campus in Allston, a Boston neighborhood across the Charles River from the Cambridge campus. The John W. Weeks Bridge, a pedestrian bridge over the Charles River, connects the two campuses.

Efforts expanded in the 2000s when Harvard purchased lots from CSX's Beacon Park Yard. Intending a major expansion, Harvard, as of 2017, owned more land in Allston than it did in Cambridge. A ten-year plan calls for 1.4 million square feet (130,000 square meters) of new construction and 500,000 square feet (50,000 square meters) of renovations, including new and renovated buildings at Harvard Business School; a hotel and conference center; a multipurpose institutional building; renovations to graduate student housing and to Harvard Stadium; new athletic facilities; new laboratories and classrooms for the John A. Paulson School of Engineering and Applied Sciences; expansion of the Harvard Education Portal; and a district energy facility.
