= John Fish (businessman) =

American businessman

- Occupation: businessman
- Spouse: Cynthia (Gelsthorpe) Fish
- Children: 3
- Parent: Edward A. Fish

John Fish is an American businessman. He is the Chairman and CEO of Suffolk Construction Company, the largest building company in New England. He is chairman of The Real Estate Roundtable and led the private effort to secure Boston’s bid for the 2024 Summer Olympics. Fish was the chair of the Greater Boston Chamber of Commerce and was the chairman of the board of the Federal Reserve Bank of Boston. According to Forbes, he has a net worth of $3.6 billion, owing to his 100% stake in Suffolk.

== Early life and education ==
Fish was raised in Hingham, Massachusetts, the son of Edward A. Fish. Fish grew up with dyslexia. He attended Tabor Academy where he played football. He has since donated nearly $20 million to the school. He was captain of the team his senior year and continued to play in college until he had a neck injury. He graduated from Bowdoin College in 1982 with a political science degree. He was presented with an honorary doctorate from Curry College in 2019.

== Career ==
After college, Fish worked for Peabody Construction, his father's company. In 1982, at the age of 23, Fish took charge of the newly formed Suffolk Construction Company, an offshoot of the family construction business, which was immediately put under Fish's control. In 2006, Fish bought out his father's stake in the company. Fish built the company into a national construction company responsible for high-profile projects such as Boston’s Millennium Tower, a new facility at Brigham and Women’s Hospital, and Encore Boston Harbor. As of 2025, the company had $7.4 billion in revenue.

In 2012 and 2015, Boston magazine named him the #1 most powerful person in Boston and was #8 on that list in 2020. He was named the 6th most influential person in Boston philanthropy in 2013. The Boston Globe named Fish Bostonian of the Year in 2015 and 2018, he was named to the Boston Business Journal's "POWER 50" list.

Fish was a vocal advocate for hosting the 2024 Summer Olympics in Boston, and he was chair of the Boston 2024 Partnership, a private group that worked on the bid until the city ultimately withdrew its bid to host the Games on July 27, 2015.

In April 2017, Fish, along with other members of Partnership for New York City, visited the White House where they met with members of the Trump administration to discuss economic growth policies including infrastructure spending and financial reform. Fish was named Chair-Elect of The Real Estate Roundtable in November 2020.

In 2020, Fish unveiled a diversified business strategy for Suffolk, which included a focus on real estate funding through its investment arm, Suffolk Capital, and the creation of a construction technology venture capital firm, Suffolk Technologies, launched in 2023.

In 2022, as Chair of the Real Estate Roundtable, Fish co-authored a letter to President Joe Biden urging federal agencies to return to in-person work policies, citing the negative economic and social consequences that work-from-home policies can have for cities.

== Philanthropy ==
In 2008, the Lewis Family Foundation honored Fish with a CEO Social Leadership Award at the Boston Business Journal's Corporate Philanthropy & Citizenship Summit. In 2009, he was recognized with a Public Service Award by NAIOP for his civic and charitable work.

Fish has provided scholarships for multiple children to attend Tabor Academy. In 2009, Fish founded Boston Scholar Athletes, an organization aimed at helping student athletes improve their academic performance, and he donated $6 million to the program between 2009 and 2021. The multimillion-dollar nonprofit ran tutoring centers in 20 high schools and supported underfunded athletic teams with uniforms, equipment and coaching clinics.

In 2010, Fish joined a group of 14 chief executives from the largest companies in Massachusetts to establish the Massachusetts Competitive Partnership (MACP). Fish was named chairman of the organization. In 2011, Fish and his wife were inducted into the Seneca Society of Hobart and William Smith Colleges.

He has served as fundraising campaign chair for Brigham and Women's Hospital's “Life.Giving.Breakthroughs” $1 billion capital campaign, and has donated $5 million to the cause.

In 2014, Fish was named Chair of the Greater Boston Chamber of Commerce. He also served as chair of the Federal Reserve Bank of Boston's board of directors until 2017. He was named chairman of Boston College’s Board of Trustees, the first non-alumnus in that role. Fish is also on the board of the Boys & Girls Clubs of Boston and was named chairman of the board of trustees of Brigham and Women's Hospital in January 2018. In 2020, Fish received the Corey C. Griffin Humanitarian Award.

Fish has donated to Republican and Democrat political campaigns. He supported the Obama campaign in 2007 and raised between $100,000 and $200,000 for Obama's 2012 bid for re-election. In 2018 he donated $33,900 to the Republican National Committee and $25,000 to House Speaker Paul Ryan’s PAC.

He received the New England Council's “New Englander of the Year Award”. In November 2015, Fish was given the Ralph Lowell Distinguished Citizen Award for service to others from the Boy Scouts of America Spirit of Adventure Council.

In 2018, Boston College named the Fish Field House in recognition of a gift from Fish as the former Board of Trustees chairman for the school. The facility has a regulation AstroTurf field, and a 12,000 square-foot strength and conditioning center.

In 2024, Fish co-founded the Mass Opportunity Alliance to promote more lenient tax policy for Massachusetts businesses and “defend and strengthen the Massachusetts business environment”.

== Personal life ==
Fish is married to Cynthia (Gelsthorpe) Fish, daughter of American marketing executive Edward Gelsthorpe. They have three daughters.
