= Andrew Zimbalist =

American economist

Andrew S. Zimbalist (born October 16, 1947) is an American economist and author of twenty-four books. He is the Robert A. Woods Professor of Economics at Smith College.

== Biography ==
Zimbalist received his B.A. from the University of Wisconsin–Madison, in 1969 and his M.A. and Ph.D. from Harvard University in 1972 and 1974 respectively.

He has been in the Economics Department at Smith College since 1974. He has published several dozen articles and twenty-four books, including Circus Maximus: The Economic Gamble Behind Hosting the Olympics and the World Cup. He did a biweekly commentary on the business of sports for National Public Radio's Marketplace between 2002 and 2005, and appears regularly with commentary on sports and public policy in the national media. He is a member of the editorial board of the Journal of Sports Economics.

He has consulted in Latin America for the United Nations Development Programme, the United States Agency for International Development and numerous companies, and he has consulted in the sports industry for players' associations, teams, cities, companies and leagues. He was one of the leading critics of the Boston 2024 Olympic bid, serving as an adviser to the "No Boston Olympics" activist group. In the mid-1990s Zimbalist was one of the co-founders of the United Baseball League (UBL) which was a planned third major league.

In 2018, Zimbalist was presented the Henry Chadwick Award by the Society for American Baseball Research for his excellence in preserving the history of baseball.

== Family ==
Zimbalist's eldest sons, Jeff and Michael, are both filmmakers. He also has twin children named Alex and Ella Zimbalist. He lives with his family in Northampton, Massachusetts. He is a second cousin, once removed, of actor Efrem Zimbalist Jr.

== Bibliography ==
- Comparing Economic Systems (1989)
- The Cuban Economy: Measurement and Analysis of Socialist Performance (1989)
- Panama at the Crossroads (1991)
- Baseball and Billions (1992)
- Sports, Jobs and Taxes (1997)
- Unpaid Professionals: Commercialism and Conflict in Big-time College Sports (1999)
- The Economics of Sport, I & II (2001)
- May the Best Team Win: Baseball Economics and Public Policy (2003)
- National Pastime: How Americans Play Baseball and the Rest of the World Plays Soccer (2005)
- In the Best Interests of Baseball? The Revolutionary Reign of Bud Selig (2006)
- The Bottom Line: Observations and Arguments in the Sports Business (2007)
- Equal Play: Title IX and Social Change (2008)
- Circling the Bases: Essays on the Challenges and Prospects of the Sports Business (2010)
- An updated and expanded edition of his In the Best Interests of Baseball? Governing Our National Pastime (2013)
- The Sabermetric Revolution: Assessing the Growth of Analytics in Baseball (2014)
- Circus Maximus: The Economic Gamble Behind Hosting the Olympics and the World Cup (2015)
- Unwinding Madness: What Went Wrong with College Sports and How to Fix It (2017)
- No Boston Olympics: How and Why Smart Cities Are Passing on the Torch (2017)
