= Boston Landing station =

Railway station in Brighton, Massachusetts, US

Boston Landing
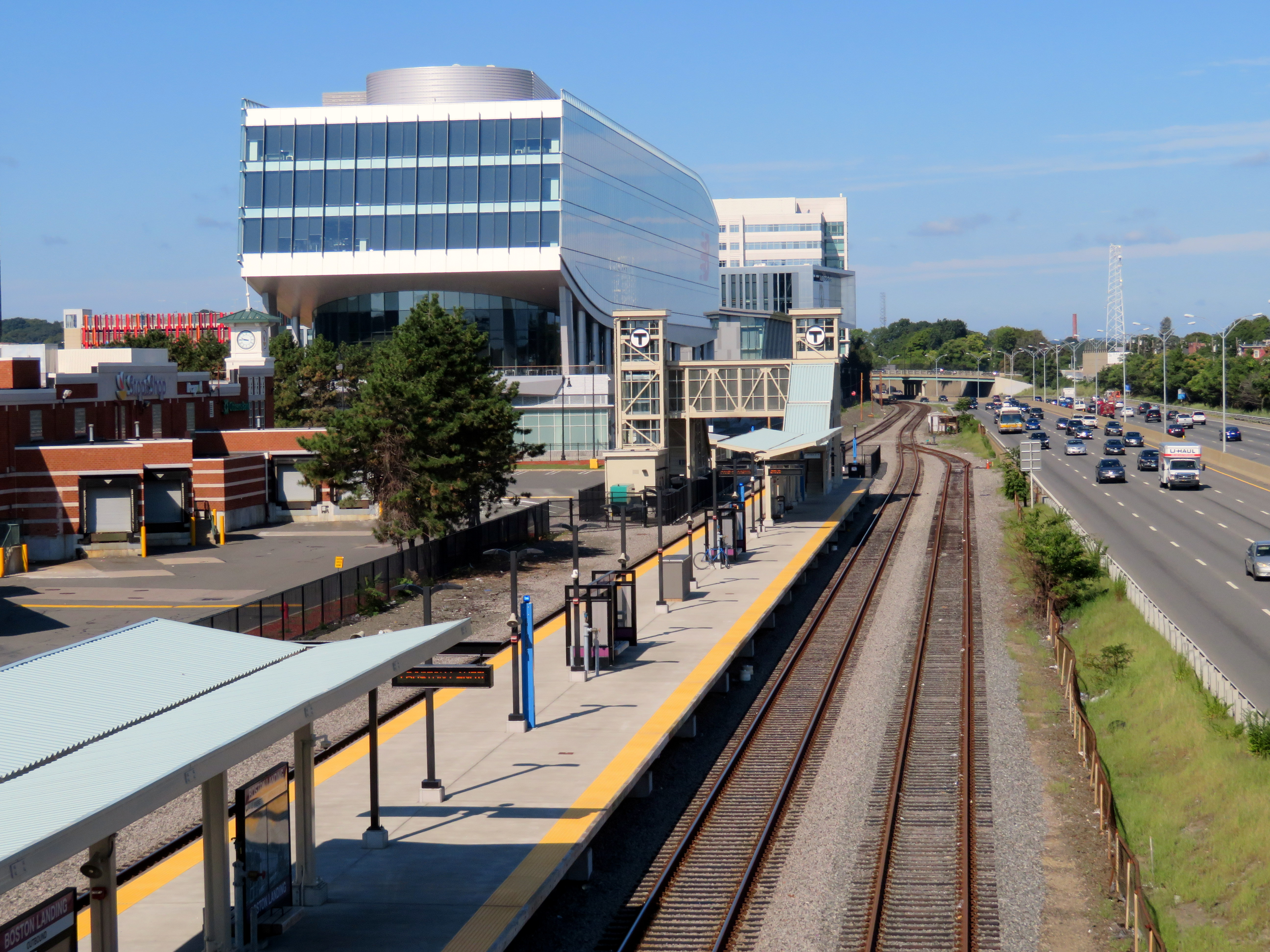
- Boston Landing station and New Balance headquarters in 2018

General information
- Location: Everett Street at Guest Street; Brighton, Boston, Massachusetts
- Coordinates: 42.3572°N 71.1393°W
- Line: Worcester Main Line
- Platforms: 1 island platform
- Tracks: 3
- Connections: MBTA bus: 64

Construction
- Cycle facilities: Bicycle racks; Blue Bikes bikeshare station
- Accessible: Yes

Other information
- Fare zone: 1A

History
- Opened: May 22, 2017
- Closed: April 1959 (former stations)

Passengers
- 2024: 1,266 daily boardings

Services
Preceding station	MBTA	Following station
Newtonville toward Worcester	Framingham/Worcester Line	Lansdowne toward South Station
Location

Boston Landing station is an MBTA Commuter Rail station in Boston, Massachusetts, United States. It is served by the Framingham/Worcester Line. It is located in the Brighton neighborhood just west of the Everett Street bridge, next to the Massachusetts Turnpike. It serves the Allston-Brighton area as well as the Boston Landing development including Warrior Ice Arena. The station is fully accessible, with a single full-length high-level island platform. Elevators and stairs lead to Arthur Street and to the Everett Street bridge.

The station, which was officially announced on June 7, 2012, is the result of discussions dating back to 1998. It was then projected to cost $16 million and to serve as many as 2,400 daily riders by 2030. It is an infill station, since commuter rail trains passed frequently on existing tracks through the site. In November 2012, New Balance announced their intention to open the station in 2014. However, in May 2014, the expected opening was pushed back to the fall of 2016. The new station is being financed by New Balance under a public-private partnership agreement. Prior to a May 2013 renaming, the proposed station project was known as New Brighton Landing.

A groundbreaking ceremony for the $20 million station was held on May 12, 2015. The station opened on May 22, 2017. Boston Landing station is fully accessible, with elevators on the pedestrian bridge to Arthur Street and another elevator to the Everett Street bridge.

== History ==
=== Former stations ===
==== Early stations ====
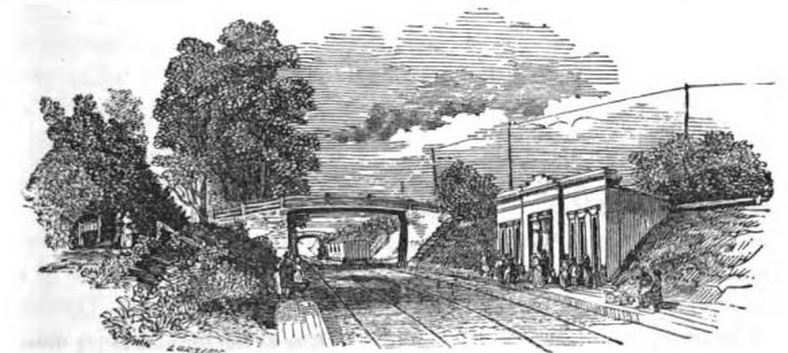
1847 woodcutting of the first Brighton station in Winship Gardens

The Boston and Worcester Railroad (B&W) opened as far as West Newton in April 1834. The first intermediate station was located at Brighton; it was alternately known at first as Winship Gardens after the adjacent gardens. The small depot was located on the north side of the tracks near and probably just west of Market Street. The first train to arrive at Brighton was reportedly greeted by a celebratory cannon shot. Serving both tourists headed to the gardens and livestock dealers bound for the nearby cattle market, it quickly became one of the railroad's busiest stations. By 1850, the station reported generated $5,000 in revenues some weeks, with round-trip tickets to Boston costing just 12.5 cents.

Railroads frequently built stations in rural areas on their suburban lines, hoping to attract new development and thus prompt more commuters to use their lines. A flag stop with limited service was later added at Cambridge Crossing, where what is now Cambridge Street crossed the line at grade. The name confused travelers, as the station was not particularly close to Cambridge itself; by 1850 the name "East Brighton" was proposed instead. The B&W merged with its extension/rival, the Western Railroad, in 1867 to become the Boston and Albany Railroad (B&A). That year, the B&A built a wood-frame depot off Cambridge Street near Harvard Street. Wishing to further distance itself from Cambridge, the village voted in 1868 to rename itself as Allston after the painter Washington Allston. The Post Office acknowledged the name change, as did the B&A; the station was officially renamed Allston on June 1, 1868. By 1870, ridership was at double 1867 levels.

The railroad had originally been built on the northern fringes of Brighton to appease residents who did not want the noise and danger of a railroad in their village center. However, as its popularity grew, so did the local regret for that choice. In 1871, residents attempted to privately finance a branch line that would split from the mainline at Allston and run to Brighton Center. From there, the branch would have either ran north to rejoin the mainline, or continued west through Oak Square and reached the main at Newton. Two surveys were carried out - the latter of which proposed to extend the branch through Newton Lower Falls to Grantville - but the branch was not built.

==== 1880s stations ====
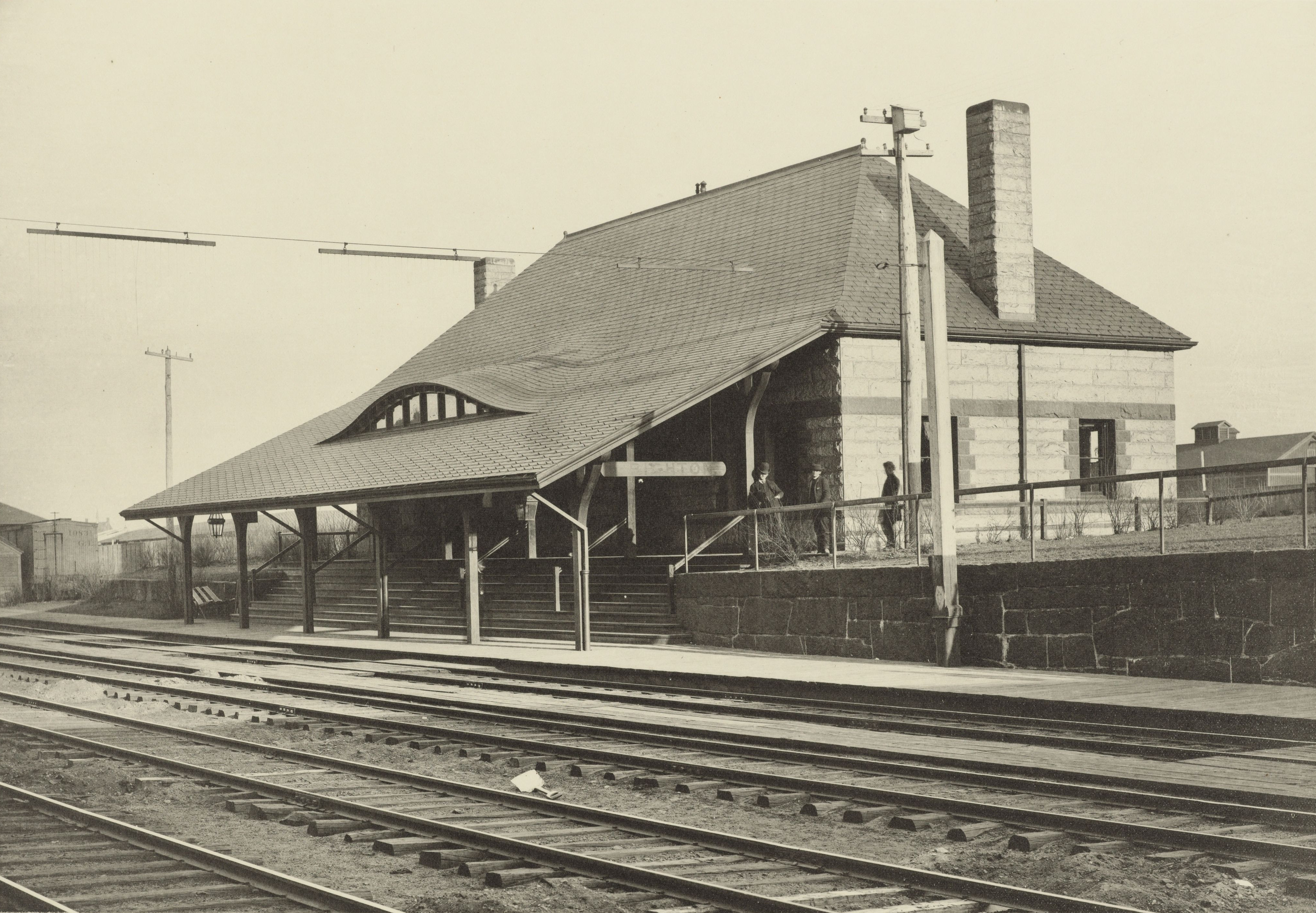
Brighton station in the late 1800s. The station, designed by H.H. Richardson, was demolished in 1959.

After years of deferred investment after the Panic of 1873, the B&A began a substantial improvement program to its suburban stations around 1879. This was likely to divert profits - capped at 10% under state law - into capital investment which would serve as an expanded base for larger profits later. Famed architect H.H. Richardson would ultimately design nine stations for the railroad before his 1886 death; his successors Shepley, Rutan, and Coolidge designed an additional 23 stations by 1894. A new Brighton station was commissioned in July 1884, and construction by the Norcross Brothers firm was completed in 1885. The new station opened on July 6, 1885.

The station agent was removed from Allston in May 1949, but the station building remained in use as shelter for passengers. Allston and Brighton stations were closed in April 1959 (along with University, Faneuil, and Newton) when much of the main line was reduced from 4 to 2 tracks during the building of the Massachusetts Turnpike. The station closures left the northern part of Brighton lacking rail service. The Brighton station was demolished during highway construction, while the Allston station remained intact. The Allston Depot Steakhouse opened in the building in 1972, followed by Sports Depot in 1988 and Regina Pizzeria in 2010. It was designated a Boston Landmark by the Boston Landmarks Commission in 1997. Regina Pizzeria closed in July 2020; that August, Allston music venue Great Scott announced that they were in negotiations to lease the station to replace their former location. That plan fell through in 2022.

=== Planning a new station ===
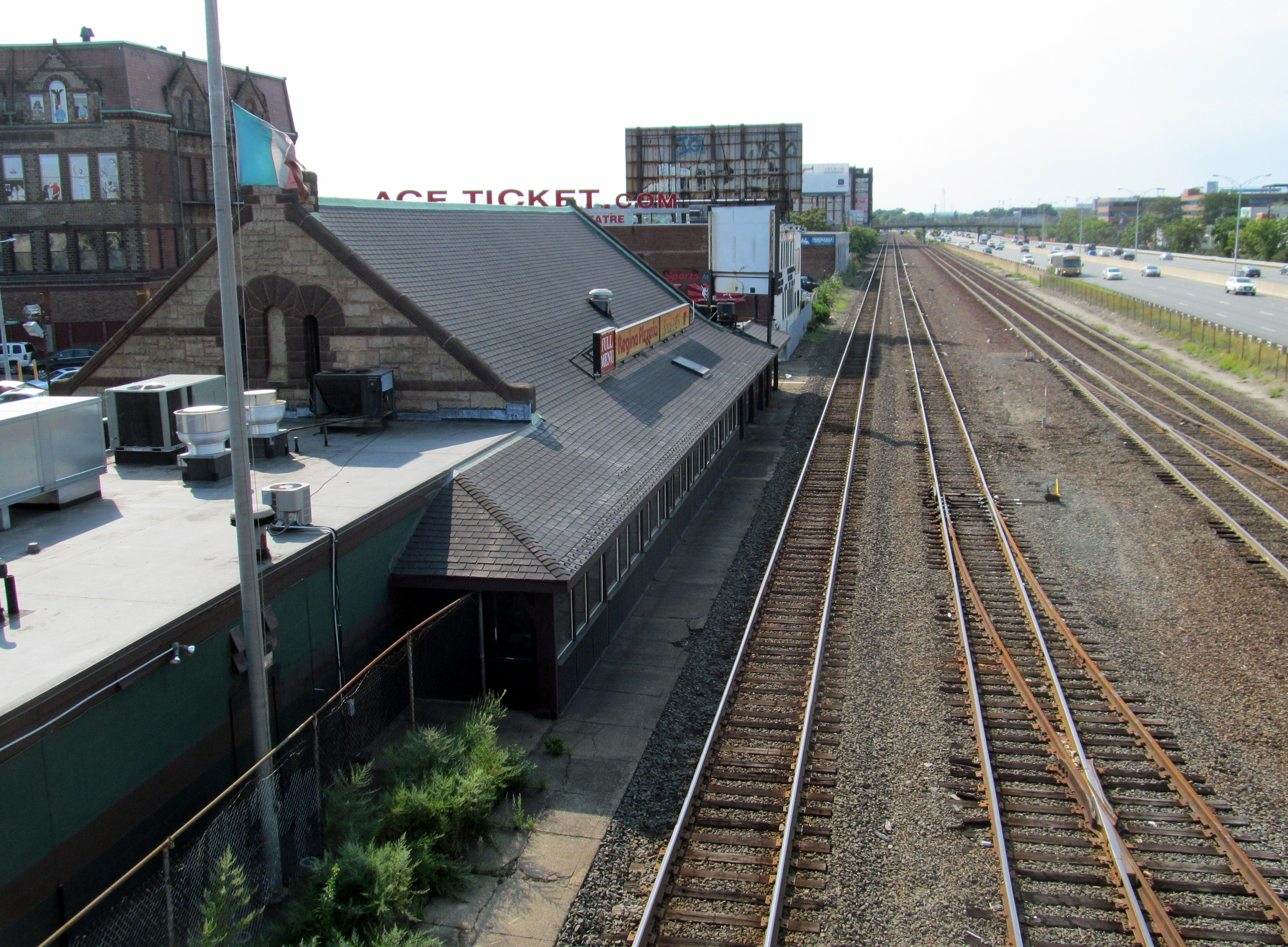
Allston depot, one of the station sites considered in the 2009 study, seen here in 2012

In 1998, a new station in Allston-Brighton began to be considered as part of the Urban Ring planning process. In 2007, the City of Boston allocated $500,000 in funding for the Allston Multimodal Station Study. The study analyzed both commuter rail and DMU local service along the corridor, with potential stops at Faneuil, Market Street, Everett Street, Cambridge Street, West (Ashford Street), and Commonwealth Avenue. Allston was soon determined the most likely location for an initial commuter rail stop, using either the Everett Street or Cambridge Street location, with more stops and DMU service to follow later. Local opinion was skewed towards Cambridge Street, with residents citing better bus connections and access to Union Square, plus security risks at Everett Street. The station was estimated to serve 2,000 daily riders by 2030, cost $10 million, and take ten years to actually reach completion when the recommendations were made in 2009.

In 2009 and 2010, the state negotiated a major agreement with CSX Transportation that involved the purchase of several rail lines, including purchasing the line between Framingham and Worcester. The agreement also included CSX moving its intermodal freight operations from the Beacon Park Yard in Allston to a new yard in Worcester. The abandonment of Beacon Park Yards allows for an increase in MBTA service on the Framingham/Worcester Line; additionally, the elimination of the single-track bottleneck through the yard opened the possibility for a station to be built in Allston while still allowing passing tracks. However, with no funding source available, construction of a station was not pursued.

In March 2012, New Balance submitted initial plans for a mixed-use development in Brighton, which included the possibility of a commuter rail station. In May, they officially announced the $500 million development, which is to be one block away from the station site. A company spokesperson told the Boston Globe that "If designated by MassDOT, New Brighton Landing will design, permit and construct a commuter rail station in Allston-Brighton" and that New Balance was willing to contribute to funding the station.

=== Boston Landing ===
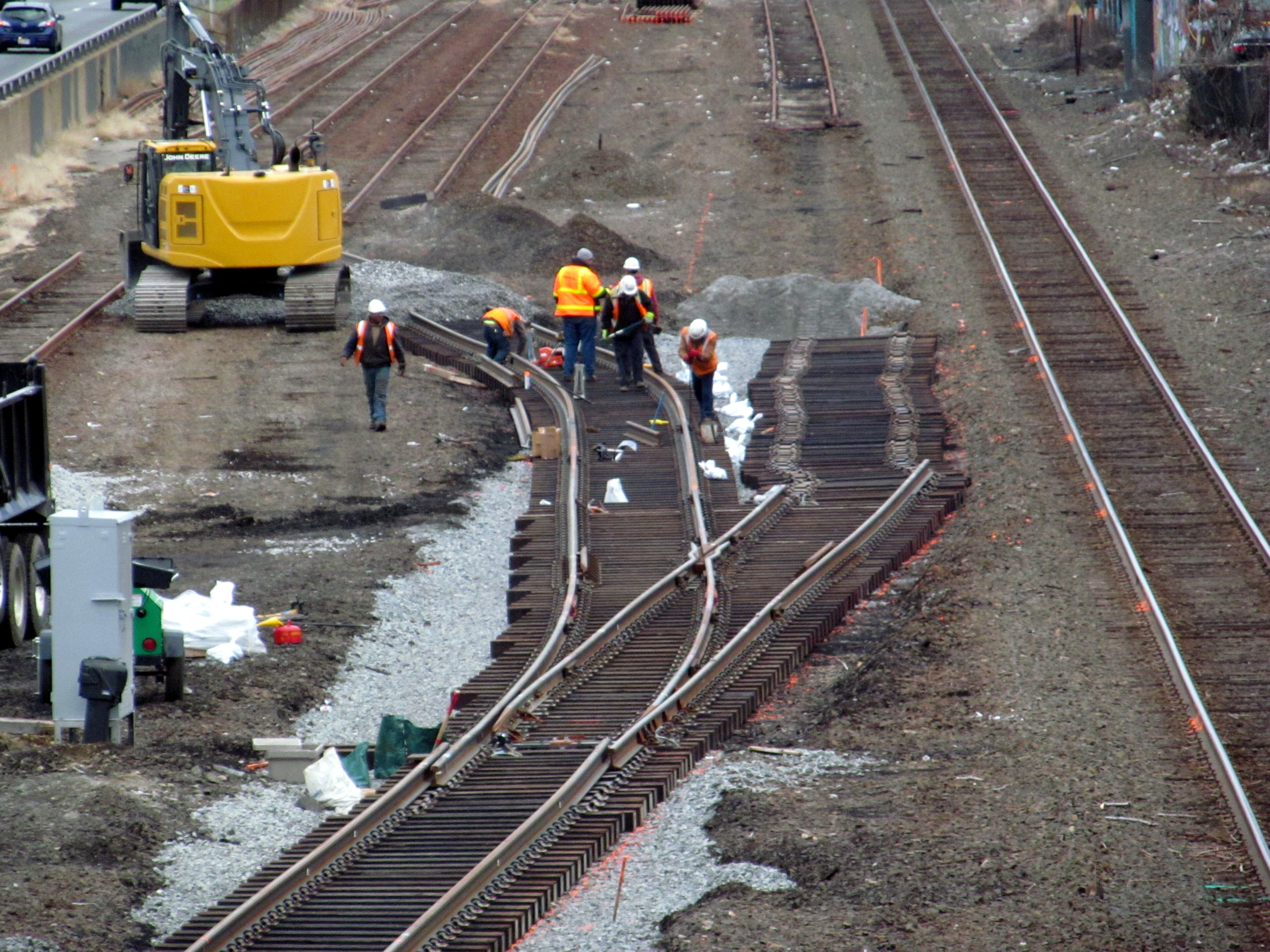
Track work near the station site in November 2015

One June 7, 2012, Allston-Brighton officials announced that New Balance and the Massachusetts Department of Transportation had signed a letter of intent to build a station at Everett Street, to be named New Brighton Landing. The public-private partnership, in which New Balance will "fund all permitting, design, construction and annual maintenance costs" for the station - then projected to cost $16 million - was the first of its kind for the MBTA. The associated New Brighton Landing development was approved by the Boston Redevelopment Authority on September 13, 2012, with construction to begin later that year.

No timetable was initially laid out for station construction. On November 9, 2012, the company announced plans to open the station in 2014. Design and permitting were to be completed in 2013, with construction finished within a year. In March 2013, the names of the station and the development were changed to Boston Landing. The proposed station was approved by a MassDOT finance board on May 14, 2013, and the agency's Board of Directors on May 22. By 2013 the expected completion date had slipped to mid-2015, and in May 2014 New Balance announced that the station would not open until the second half of 2016. The company cited the unanticipated complexity of the planning and construction for the delay.

A groundbreaking ceremony for the $20 million station was held on May 12, 2015, still with an expected opening in the fall of 2016. Construction began in October 2015 with the removal of the three yard tracks at the station site. The inner part of the Framingham/Worcester Line was closed for a weekend in December 2015 to allow construction of a temporary shoo-fly track, which allows the mainline track to be removed during construction. The mainline tracks were put back in service during a similar weekend shutdown in April 2017, restoring double track through Allston for the first time since the 1950s.

State legislators representing communities along the Worcester Line have expressed concern that Boston Landing and the planned West Station would slow down trips for suburban commuters. It was originally proposed to limit service to the stop to two inbound trains in the morning rush hour and two outbounds in the afternoon (plus an unknown amount of off-peak service), but later schedules added additional stops.

In April 2017, the MBTA announced that the station would be in Zone 1, which would have given suburban commuters inexpensive interzone fares but increased the cost of reaching downtown from Boston Landing. After criticism, the agency placed the station in Zone 1A. The station opened on May 22, 2017. Ridership was 600 daily boardings in 2018 and 1,266 in 2024.
