= Suffolk Construction Company =

American construction contracting company

Coordinates: 42.328148°N 71.070417°W

- Type: Private
- Industry: Construction
- Founded: 1982
- Founders: Ed Fish; John F. Fish
- Headquarters: Boston, Massachusetts, United States
- Key people: John F. Fish CEO; Puneet Mahajan CFO; Jay Tangney General Counsel; Tim Stroud COO; Ralph Esposito National President; Katy O'Neil CMO
- Revenue: $7.5 billion (2025)
- Number of employees: 3,500 (2026)
- Website: www.suffolk.com

Suffolk Construction Company (stylized as Suffolk) is an American construction contracting company based in Boston, Massachusetts, with additional locations in California, Florida, Maine, New York, Texas and Virginia. The company is contracted for work in the aviation, commercial, education, healthcare, gaming, residential, mission critical, and government sectors. Suffolk is the largest construction contractor in Massachusetts and one of the 20 largest in the country.

== History ==
Suffolk Construction Company was founded in 1982, by Edward Fish Sr. as an open-shop building contractor. Immediately thereafter, Fish seeded Suffolk with an $80,000 loan and transferred full leadership and management to his 23-year-old son, John F. Fish, who has led the company as president and CEO since its founding.

By 1987, the company had grown its annual revenues from $300 thousand to $66 million. In 1989, the company expanded its operations to South Florida.

Suffolk reached an agreement with Boston's carpentry union in 1993, in which it agreed to use union workers in downtown Boston, but would remain non-union in other areas. In 1999, Suffolk reached a larger deal with the carpentry union in which it agreed to use union workers throughout the New England area.

In 2009, Suffolk acquired William A. Berry & Son, a large New England contractor that specialized in biomedical and healthcare construction. Suffolk acquired the San Diego–based ROEL Construction in January 2011 in an effort to expand its growth in California.

In January 2016, the company was selected as general contractor for the $1.7 billion Wynn Resorts casino in Everett, Massachusetts. In September 2016, the company held a ceremony in which they used virtual reality technology to "break ground" on their new headquarters project. Suffolk was chosen as the general contractor for the General Electric's Boston headquarters building in December 2016.

In March 2026, Suffolk announced plans to open an office in Bangalore, India, as part of its Suffolk Global initiative. The Boston Globe reported that CEO John Fish said the move was tied to the company's goal of growing annual revenue to $10 billion.

Suffolk Technologies, a $110-million venture fund the company started in 2023, backs construction and proptech startups. Since 2020, the BOOST accelerator has run 38 companies through its program. These startups have raised over $700 million in total, robotics firms Cyphra Autonomy and Puppet Robotics among them. Suffolk uses both initiatives to deploy AI, data analytics, and automation on actual job sites.

== Notable projects ==
- William D. Mullins Memorial Center
- 360 State Street
- 340 Fremont Street
- Jade Signature
- Millennium Tower (Boston)
- Encore Boston Harbor
- Seminole Hard Rock Hotel and Casino Tampa
- MiamiCentral
- Logan International Airport Terminal E Modernization
- Seminole Hard Rock Hotel & Casino Hollywood
- Winthrop Center
- South Station Redevelopment
- Virgin Voyages, Port Miami, Terminal V
- Boston University Center for Computing & Data Sciences
- Montage Big Sky, Hotel and Residences
- Dallas/Fort Worth International Airport Terminal C Renovations
- Brightline - All Aboard Florida

== Acknowledgments ==
In 2018, Forbes reported that the company is the 148th largest private company in the U.S. That same year, Suffolk was ranked 23rd on Engineering News-Record's "Top 400 Contractors" list.

In 2023, Suffolk was ranked the 133rd largest private company in the U.S. by Forbes, and was ranked 24th on Engineering News-Record's list of top contractors.
