= Beacon Park Yard =

Rail freight yard in Boston planned for redevelopment

Coordinates: 42°21′21.89″N 71°7′22.24″W

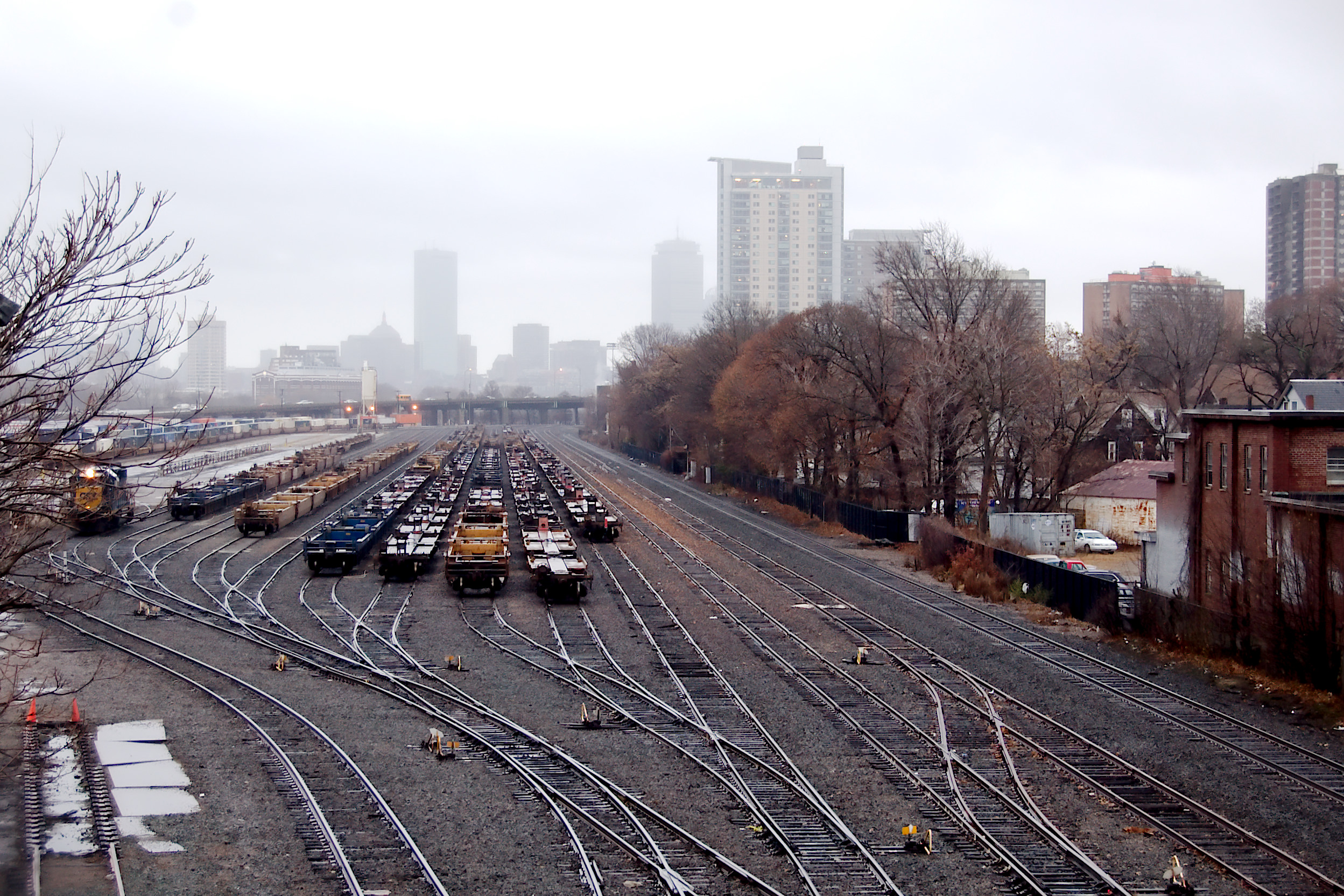
The yard in 2012 shortly before closure

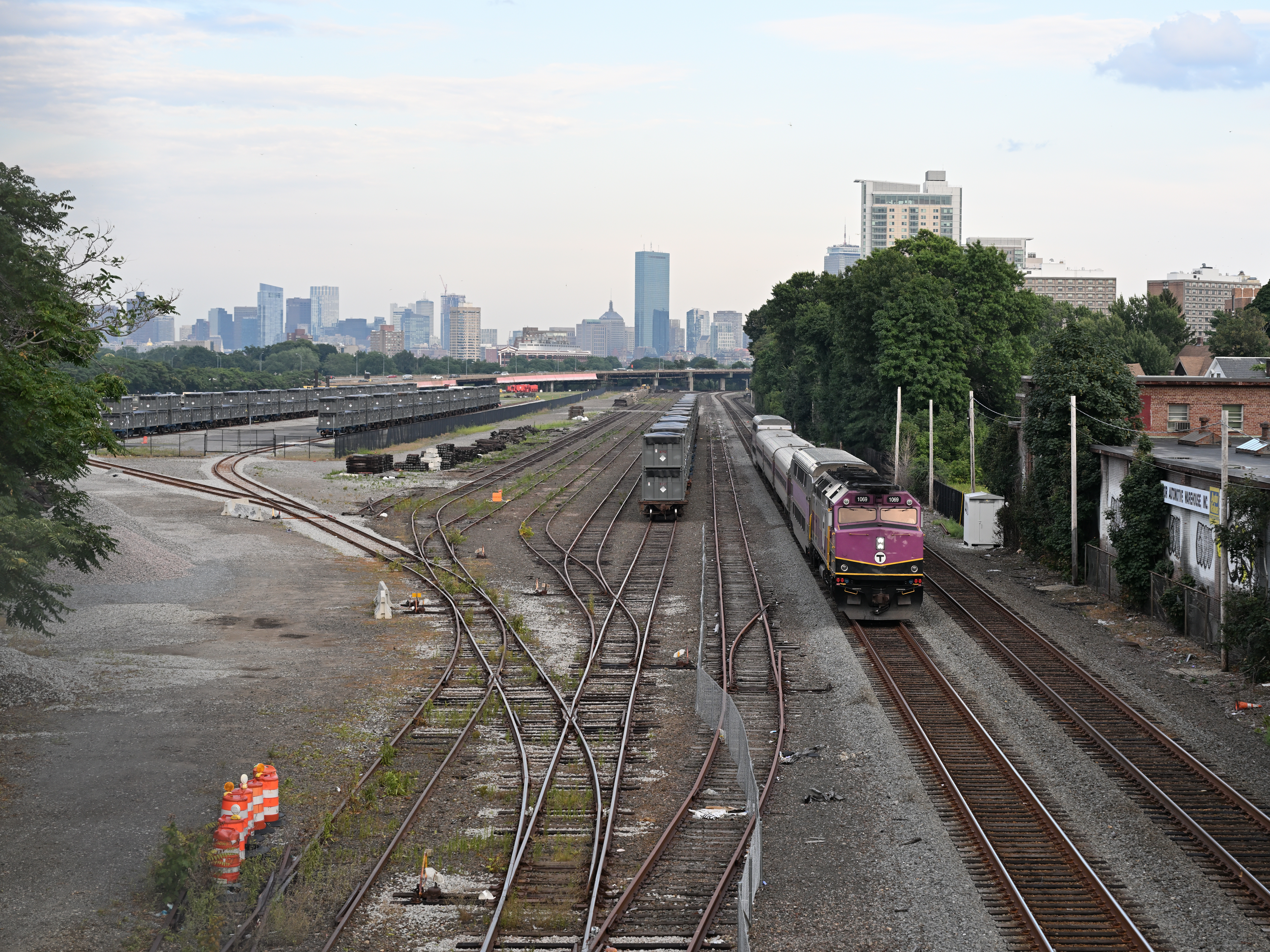
Beacon Park Yard in 2024, reopened as a transfer facility

Beacon Park Yard was a CSX Transportation rail yard in Allston, Boston, now owned by Harvard University. The yard opened in 1890 on the site of a former trotting park, from which it took its name. It was closed in 2013 following the relocation of the yard's container operations to Worcester, Massachusetts, and opening of a transload facility in Westborough, Massachusetts. Plans for the yard include relocation of the Massachusetts Turnpike Allston exit, construction of a new MBTA commuter rail station, a major real estate development, and possibly a rail layover yard.

In 2023, Harvard reopened part of the freight yard to haul away contaminated dirt being excavated to build its nearby Enterprise Research Campus.

== History ==
=== Rail usage ===
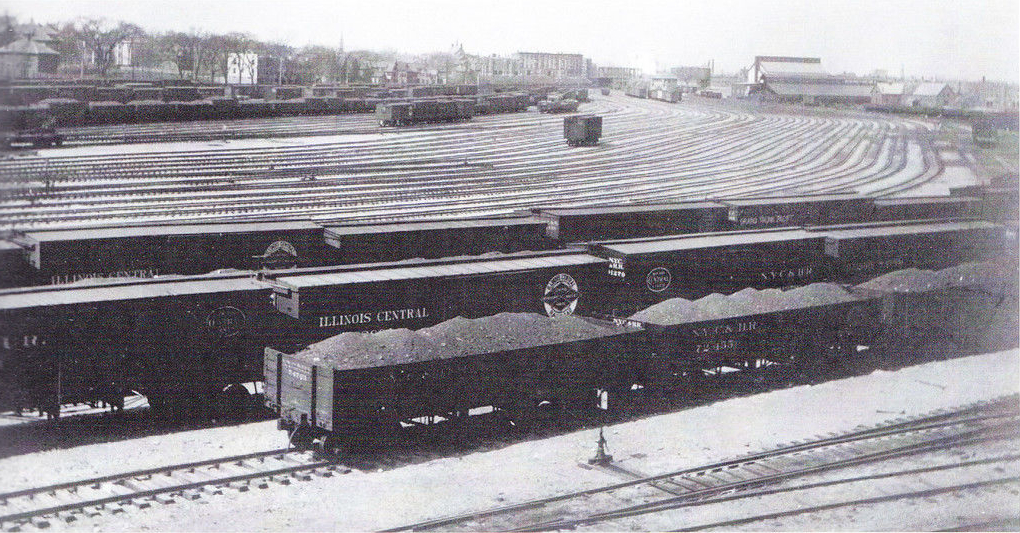
Freight cars in Beacon Park Yard around 1900

The Boston and Worcester Railroad (B&W) began operating through Allston in 1834. The railroad established car shops near Cambridge Street by the mid-1840s. Beacon Trotting Park opened east of Cambridge Street in 1864 on land just north of the railroad. In 1890, the Boston and Albany Railroad (B&A), successor to the B&W, bought the land for use as a rail yard, named Beacon Park Yard after the trotting park. The B&A became part of the New York Central Railroad in 1900.

In 1958, the Massachusetts Turnpike Authority bought the rail line east of Route 128, including the rail yard and freight sidings, from the New York Central for construction of the Massachusetts Turnpike. The Turnpike was routed along the north edge of the yard, with a toll plaza and interchange to Cambridge Street and Soldiers Field Road there. A truck tunnel was built under the Turnpike at the west end of the yard to provide access from Cambridge Street, and a set of ramps provided yard access to and from the westbound Turnpike. This enabled use of the yard for transload operations, where freight was transferred from long-distance freight trains to local trucks in the yard. The New York Central became part of Penn Central on February 1, 1968, which in turn became Conrail on April 1, 1976. When Conrail was broken up in 2000, freight operations on the line, including Beacon Park Yard, became part of CSX Transportation.

=== Closure and redevelopment plans ===
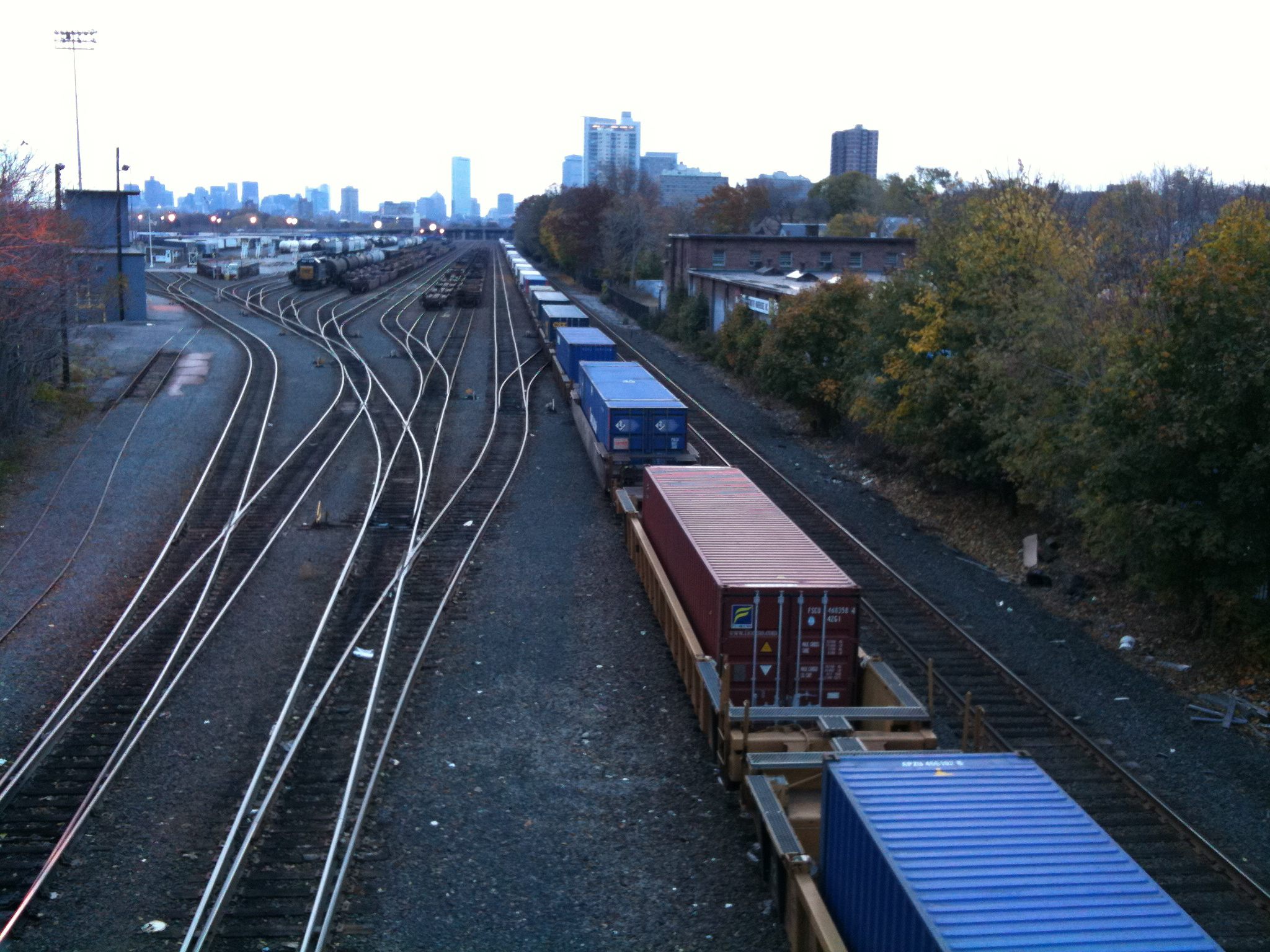
Container trains at Beacon Park Yard in 2010

In the late 1990s, Harvard University began planning a major expansion southward in Lower Allston, where substantial parcels of marginal industrial and derelict land could be redeveloped for academic, research, and commercial use. In 2000, the university purchased 47 acres (19 ha) of "Allston Landing North" - land north of Cambridge Street, and between Cambridge Street and the Turnpike - from the Turnpike Authority. In April 2003, the university purchased 91 acres (37 ha) of "Allston Landing South" - including Beacon Park Yard, the Worcester mainline tracks, the Turnpike mainline and interchange, and CSX's engine yard - from the Turnpike Authority for $75 million despite the objections of local politicians including Boston Mayor Thomas Menino. Although both purchase agreements granted permanent easements to CSX and MassDOT, the objectors expressed concerns that wealthy Harvard would attempt to buy out CSX and disrupt freight service to Boston.

In 1998, a new station in Allston-Brighton began to be considered as part of the Urban Ring planning process. In 2007, the City of Boston allocated $500,000 in funding for the Allston Multimodal Station Study. The study analyzed both commuter rail and DMU local service along the corridor, with potential stops at Faneuil, Market Street, Everett Street, Cambridge Street, West (Ashford Street) inside Beacon Park Yard, and Commonwealth Avenue. It recommended an Everett Street stop, with stations at the other locations to come later.

In September 2009, MassDOT reached a major agreement with CSX and Harvard over several railroad properties in the state. The state bought the outer Framingham/Worcester Line, Track 61, the Grand Junction Railroad, and several branch lines needed for South Coast Rail from CSX. The state also partially funded a new container yard in Worcester and a transload facility in Westborough, which allowed CSX to eventually vacate Beacon Park Yard for redevelopment. The state inherited CSX's easements, requiring Harvard to petition the state before developing any property; because of this, Harvard did not include the site in its 2007 master plan.

Construction of the Worcester container yard began in 2011, and CSX vacated Beacon Park Yard in February 2013. CSX demolished buildings, removed old rail cars, and completed soil and groundwater remediation to make the site usable for future development.

In December 2015, Harvard University completed the purchase of an additional 19 acres (77,000 m^{2}) of CSX land north of Cambridge Street for $97.25 million. Harvard's plan is to use the land as a park and later redevelopment.

In 2017 and 2018, the yard was used as a staging area for the replacement of the Commonwealth Avenue Bridge over the Massachusetts Turnpike.

In late 2023, the rail yard was partially rebuilt by Harvard and reopened for use as a solid hazardous waste transfer facility to begin the clean up process for the Allston Multimodal Project, starting with Harvard's Enterprise Research Campus. Dirt excavated from construction of new buildings is loaded into containers, which are then trucked to the Beacon Park Yard transfer facility. There, the containers are loaded onto railcars destined for landfills, mostly to Fairport, New York.

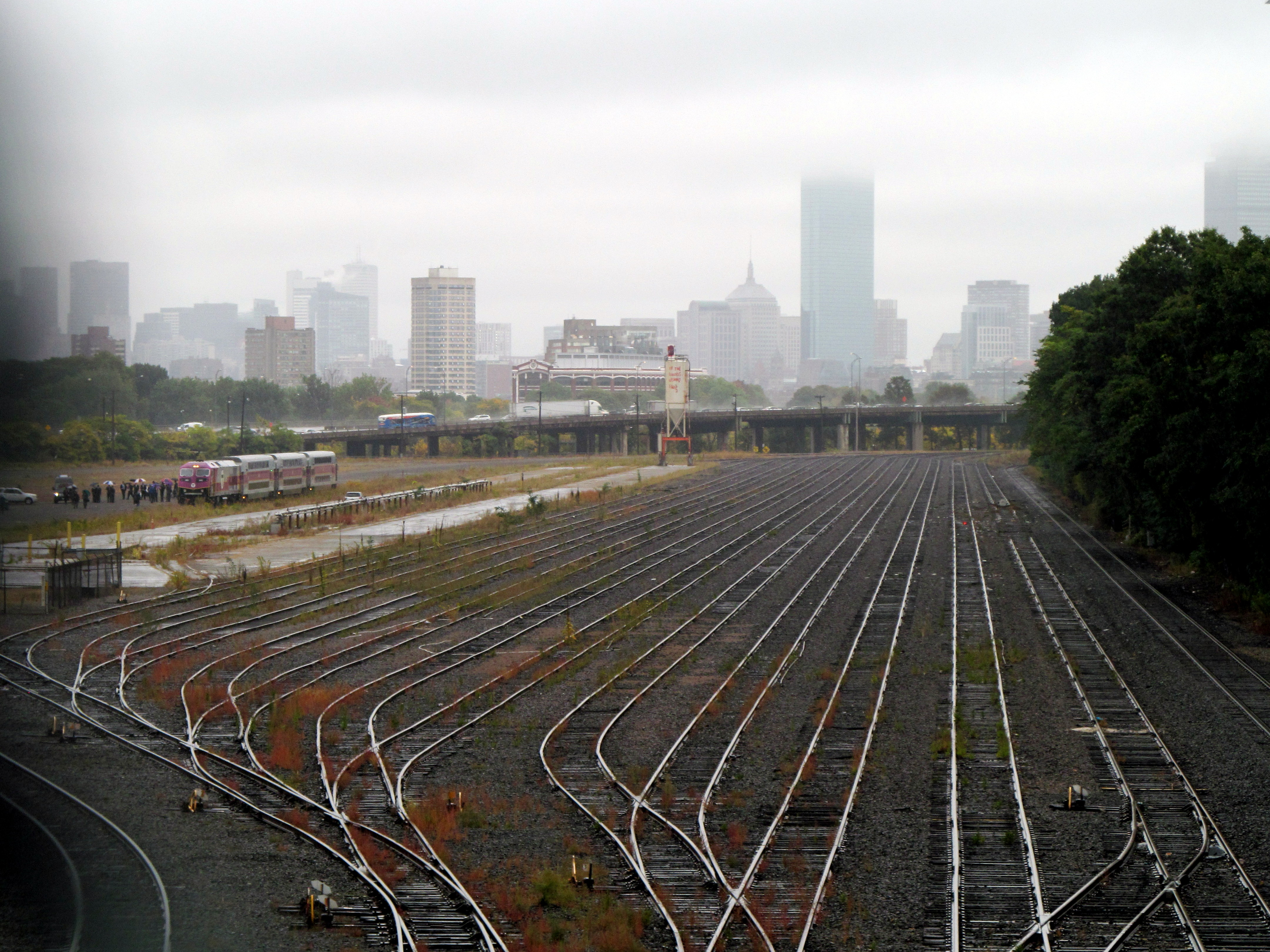
Beacon Park Yard, empty of CSX cars, in 2014. The MBTA train at left was being used for the press conference announcing plans for West Station

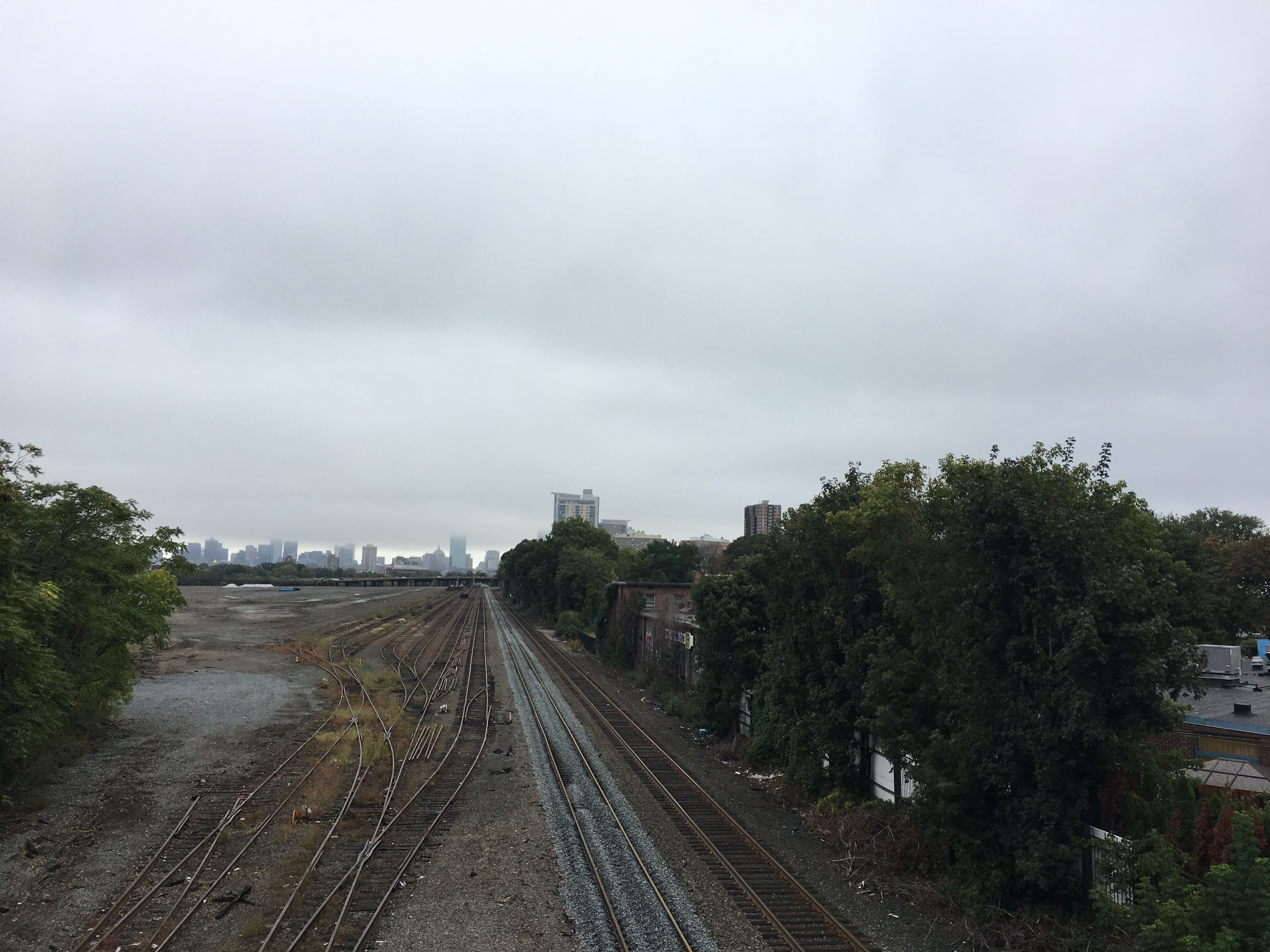
Beacon Park Yard in 2016, with all but seven yard tracks removed. The second track from the right was converted from a yard track to a mainline track to improve commuter rail capacity and reliability.

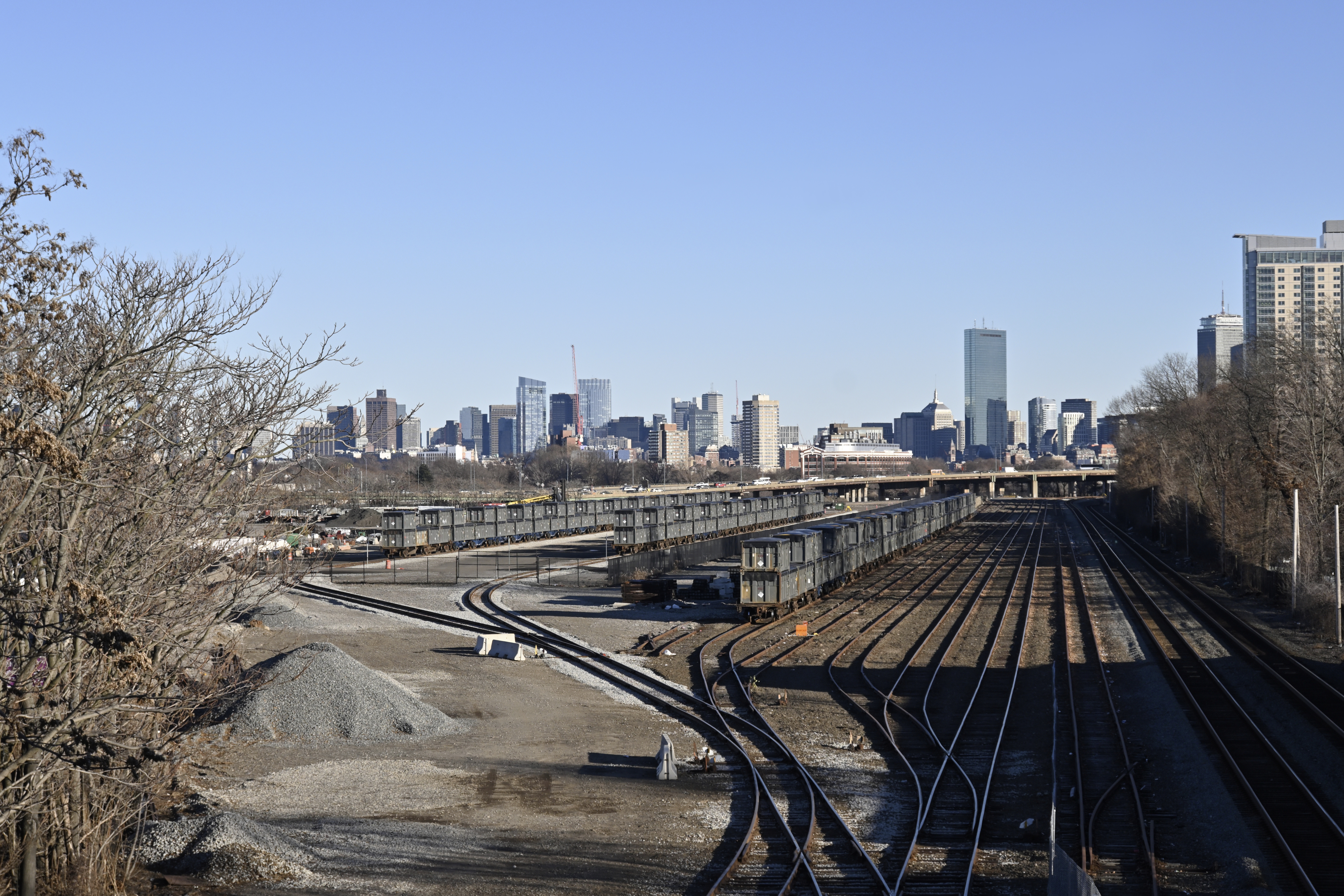
Yard in 2023 with new loading tracks

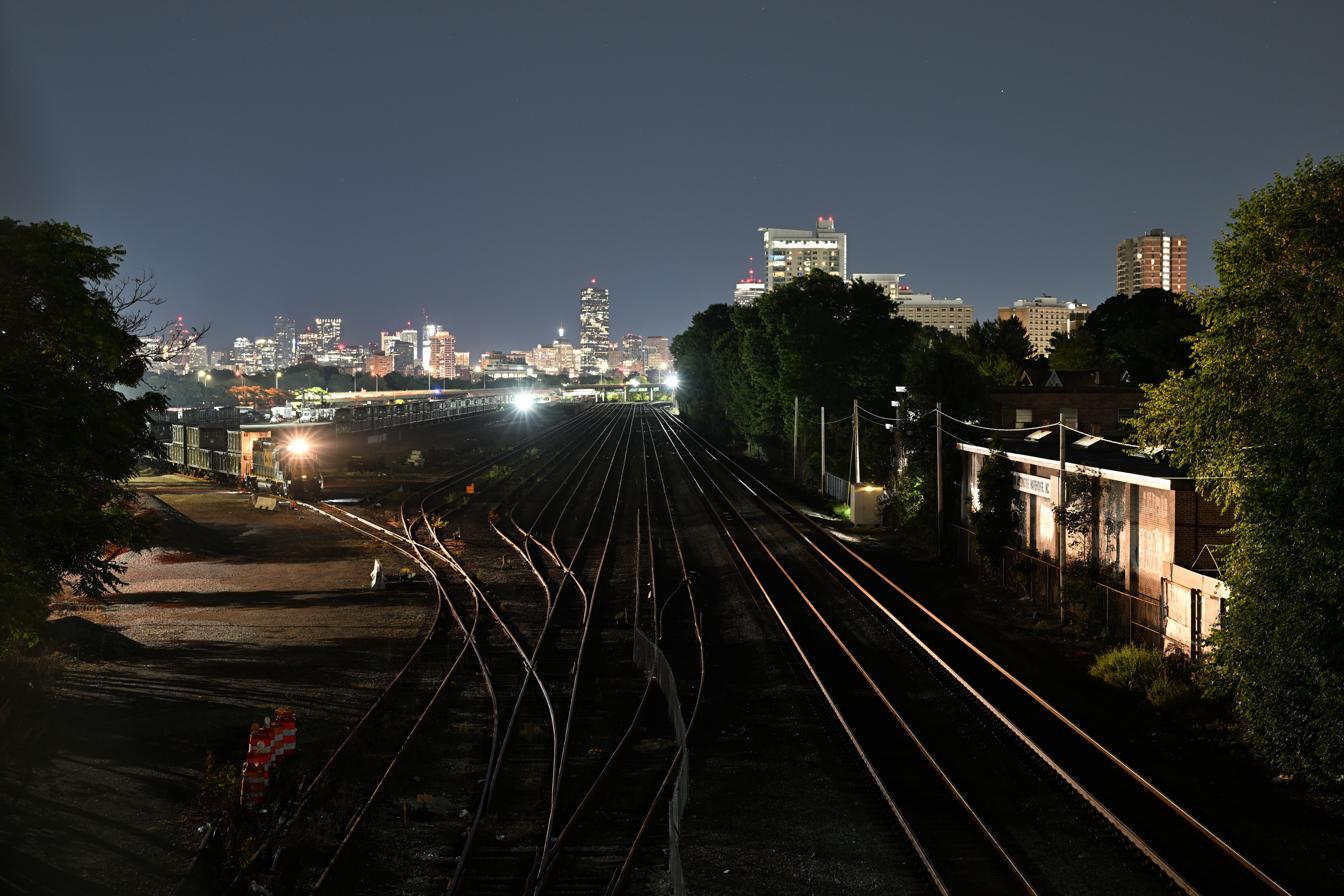
A nighttime CSX train services the loading tracks in 2024

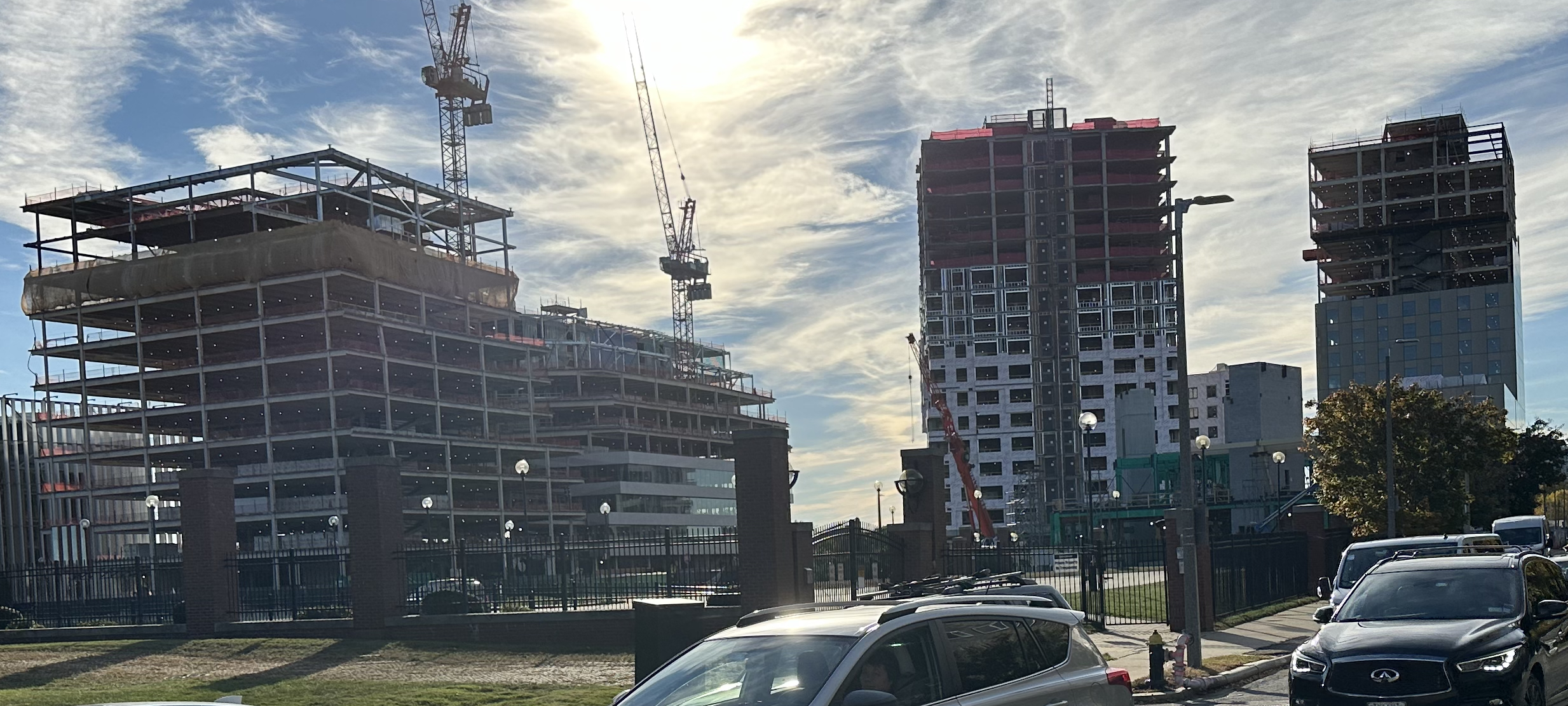
Harvard's Enterprise Research Campus under construction in 2024. Contaminated soil from the project is shipped to landfills via the reopened rail yard.

=== Allston Interchange Project ===
As part of the development of the yard, the state plans to reroute the Massachusetts Turnpike (Interstate 90) just south of its current alignment within the confines of the old yard, in order to make the road safer and free up 60 acres for development. All-electronic toll collection eliminated the need for toll booths (since demolished) at the interchange, allowing a simpler layout. In September 2014, MassDOT announced that a new commuter rail station, West Station, will be constructed at the south edge of the yard. The plan includes new streets, bicycle paths and more parkland along the Charles River. MBTA plans included in 2013 a layover facility for commuter rail trains, with storage for up to 30 train consists. In April 2024, Massachusetts Secretary of Transportation Monica Tibbits-Nutt mentioned in a speech that she preferred the yard be located on recently purchased property in Widett Circle; MassDOT was also negotiating with Amtrak for layover space. In November 2024, the state indicated plans to have a four-track layover yard at Beacon Park.

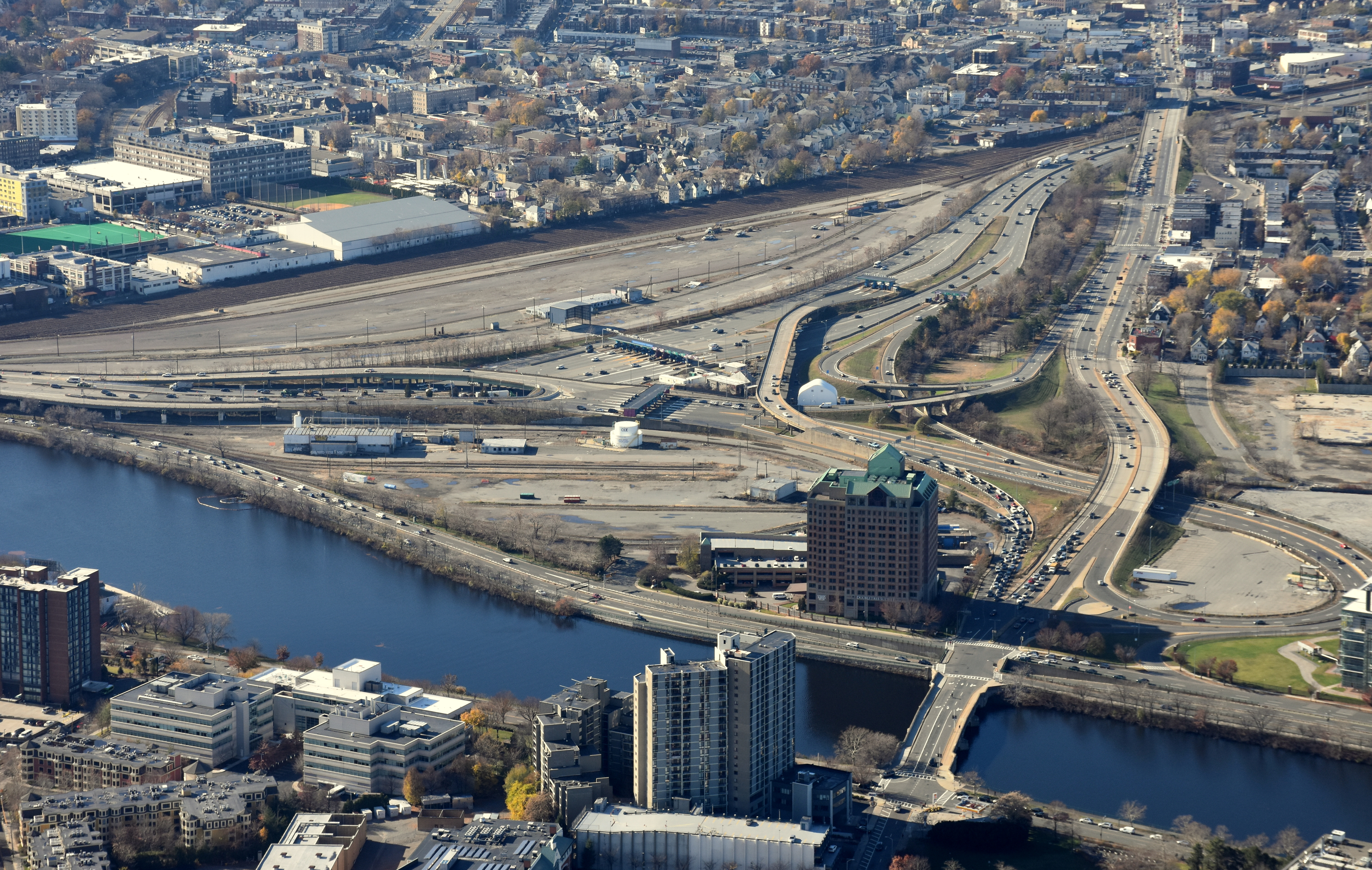
Beacon Park rail yard, upper left and Interstate 90 Allston interchange, center, facing south-west. Under the proposed plan, I-90 would be moved closer to the MBTA mainline at the southern edge of the yard. West Station would be constructed near the large white building at top left.

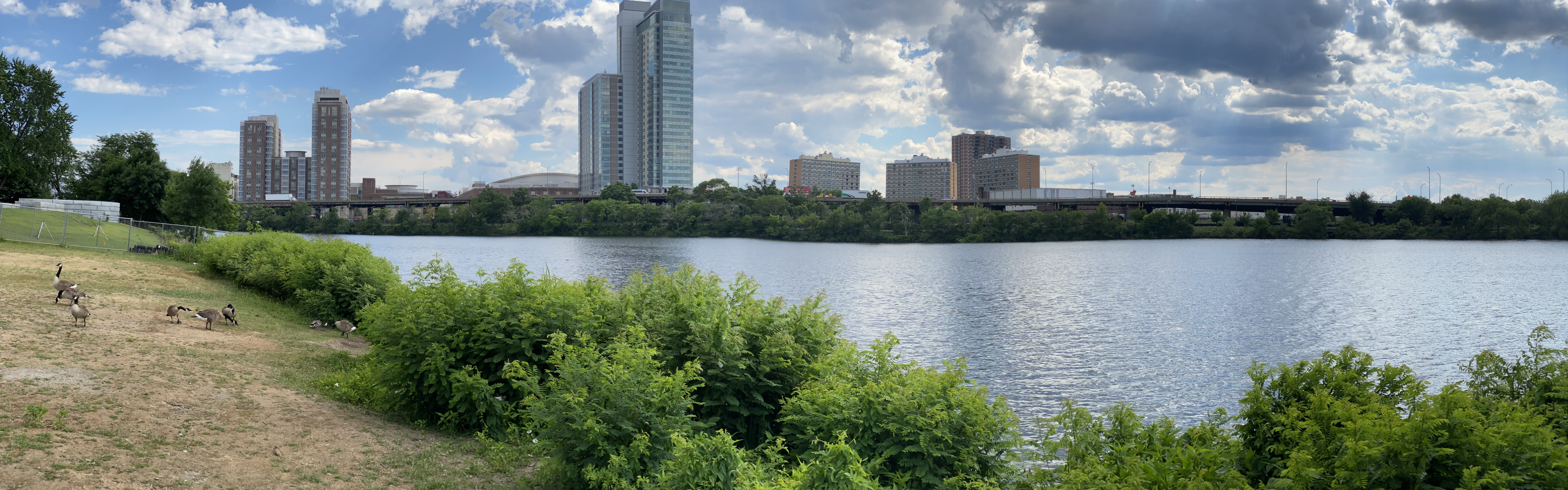
Massachusetts Turnpike viaduct that would be rebuilt as part of the proposed Allston Interchange Project, as seen from across the Charles River.

== See also ==
- List of Massachusetts Bay Transportation Authority yards
- Harvard University's expansion in Allston, Massachusetts
