= West Station (MBTA) =

Proposed train stop in Massachusetts

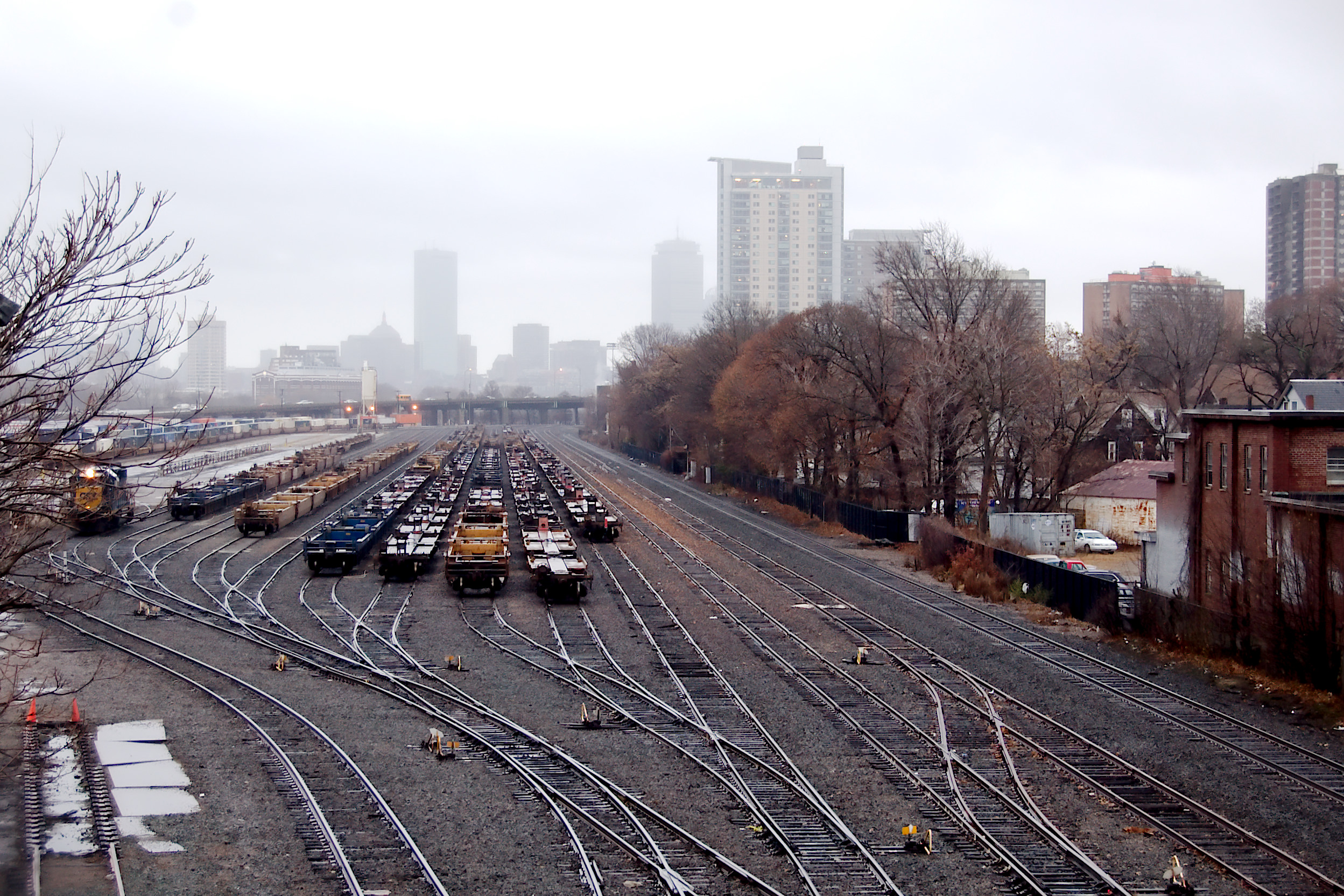
- The station will be located in the former Beacon Park Yard

General information
- Location: Ashford Street, Boston, Massachusetts
- Coordinates: 42°21′17.21″N 71°7′17.62″W
- Line: Worcester Line
- Platforms: 3
- Tracks: 4

Construction
- Accessible: yes

Other information
- Fare zone: 1A

History
- Opening: 2040 (planned)

Planned services
Preceding station	MBTA	Following station
Boston Landing toward Worcester	Framingham/Worcester Line (planned)	Lansdowne toward South Station
Terminus	Grand Junction Branch (proposed)	Fort Washington Park toward North Station
Location

West Station is a planned station on the MBTA Commuter Rail Framingham/Worcester Line, to be located in the former Beacon Park Yard in Allston, Massachusetts, United States. It was initially proposed as part of a project to straighten the Massachusetts Turnpike through the yard, allowing much of the land to be redeveloped. As of 2026, plans for the station have not proceeded beyond conceptual studies.

West Station has been proposed for over a decade. By July 2016, the state planned to file a Draft Environmental Impact Statement (DEIS) for the project in 2017 and hoped to break ground in 2019. It was then estimated to cost $25 million, to be split between Harvard University (which owns the surrounding land), the state, and a third party (intended to be Boston University pending negotiations). In December 2017, the state announced that the station cost had increased to $95 million, and that it would not open until 2040. In January 2018, Harvard increased its pledge to $50 million, with an additional $8 million incentive to build an interim station.

In August 2023, the City of Boston, Harvard University, Boston University and the Massachusetts Department of Transportation (MassDOT) collectively committed $300 million to the $1.9 billion I-90 Allston Multimodal Project. This initiative includes the development of a new neighborhood and the construction of West Station on land predominantly owned by Harvard.

== History ==
=== Background ===
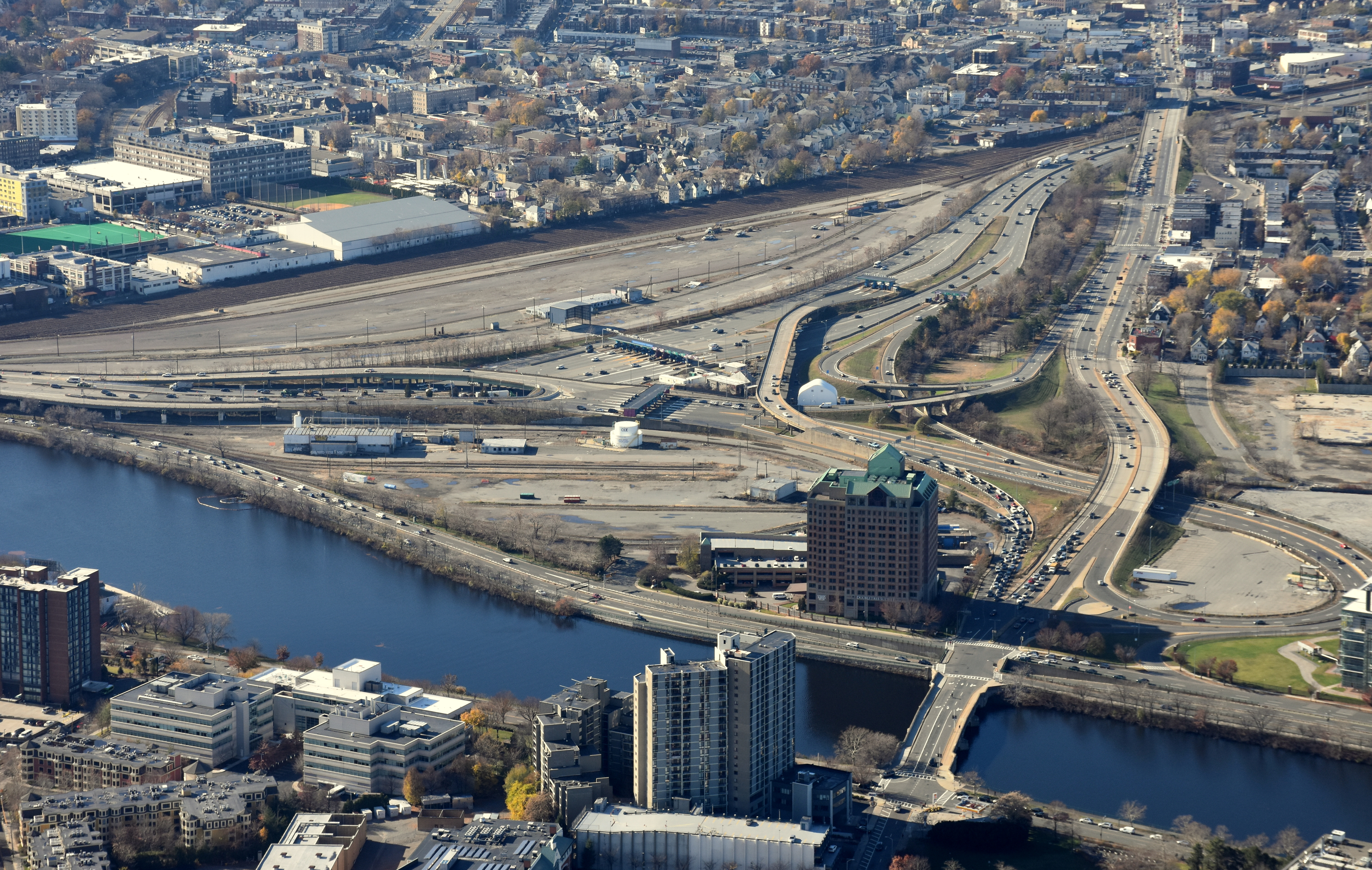
Beacon Park rail yard, upper left and Interstate 90 Allston interchange, center, facing south-west. Under proposed plans, I-90 would be moved closer to the MBTA mainline at the southern edge of the yard. West Station would be constructed near the large white building at top left.

The Boston & Albany Railroad originally had a number of stations in the inner ring of suburbs, including stations at Allston (Cambridge Street) and Cottage Farms (Commonwealth Avenue). No station was built near the split with the Grand Junction Railroad as the Grand Junction did not carry passenger service. A large freight yard, Beacon Park Yard, was ultimately built just west of the split. All stations east of Newtonville were closed around 1962 when much of the main line was reduced from 4 to 2 tracks during the building of the Massachusetts Turnpike. The station closures left Allston and Brighton lacking commuter rail service.

In 1998, a new station in Allston-Brighton began to be considered as part of the Urban Ring planning process. In 2007, the City of Boston allocated $500,000 in funding for the Allston Multimodal Station Study. The study analyzed both commuter rail and DMU local service along the corridor, with potential stops at Faneuil, Market Street, Everett Street, Cambridge Street, West (Ashford Street), and Commonwealth Avenue. The final recommendation, for a commuter rail station at Everett Street with DMU stops added later at the other locations, sparked local controversy but was mostly well received.

In 2009 and 2010, the state negotiated a major agreement with CSX Transportation that involved the purchase of several rail lines, including purchasing the line between Framingham and Worcester. The agreement also included CSX moving its intermodal freight operations from Beacon Park Yard to a new yard in Worcester. The abandonment of Beacon Park Yard allows for an increase in MBTA service on the Framingham/Worcester Line; additionally, the elimination of the single-track bottleneck through the yard opened the possibility for a station to be built in Allston (possibly in conjunction with the Urban Ring project) while still allowing passing tracks. However, with no funding source available, construction of a station was not pursued.

In June 2012, New Balance announced that it would build the Everett Street station, Boston Landing, as part of their Boston Landing development. The station opened on May 22, 2017.

== West Station development ==
=== Early proposals ===
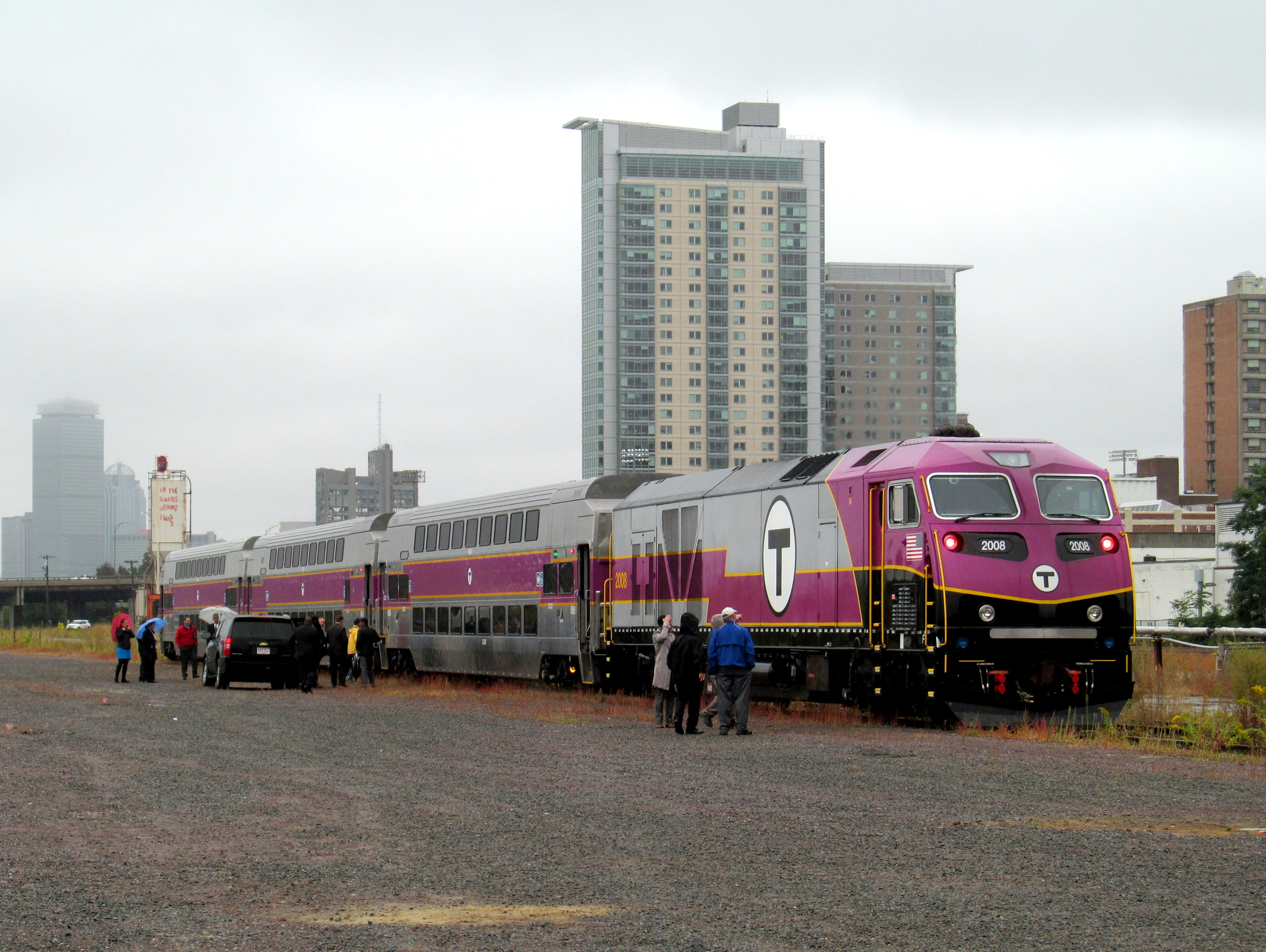
An MBTA train in Beacon Park Yard for the September 30, 2014 press conference

In October 2013, MassDOT announced a $260 million plan to straighten the Mass Pike through Beacon Park Yard, replacing the existing toll booths with high-speed all-electronic tolling and allowing Harvard University and others to develop land currently cordoned off by the highway and its interchange ramps. The initial plans included the possibility of an 8 or 9-track commuter rail layover yard next to the Worcester main.

In January 2014, MassDOT released its ten-year plan, which included a six-line diesel multiple unit (DMU) network called the Indigo Line proposed to be implemented by 2024. As proposed, the Indigo Line was envisioned as a new service of the MBTA's rapid transit network and would have mainly utilized existing MBTA Commuter Rail infrastructure within Greater Boston. Initial plans for the Indigo Line included additional service on the Fairmount Line, the Newburyport/Rockport Line (to Lynn), the Lowell Line (to Anderson RTC), and the Worcester Line (to Riverside), as well as new service from Back Bay to the BCEC on Track 61 and from North Station along the Grand Junction to a new station near Boston University's West Campus. This new West Station would offer connections between the Grand Junction DMU route, the Riverside DMU route, and conventional commuter service on the Worcester Line. It was proposed to attract transit oriented development to the Beacon Park area, similar to Assembly Station and the Assembly Square development in Somerville, Massachusetts.

Despite being announcement as a capital investment project, no dedicated funding source was established for the Indigo Line plan, including West Station. In May 2014, MassDOT announced that the station would not be included in the budget for the Turnpike project, placing it in an uncertain future. On September 30, 2014, a press conference was held in Beacon Park Yard to announce that the station would be constructed in concert with the Turnpike straightening. The cost of the $25 million station will be split between Harvard University, the state, and a third party to be determined. In March 2015, the Boston Globe revealed that Boston University was to have been the final third; however, this was not finalized before Deval Patrick left office. BU's contribution would be dependent on a promise that automobile and bus traffic would not travel through BU's West Campus to reach the station, and instead use new roads being constructed during the Beacon Park project (BU later dropped this demand.)

The entire Indigo Line proposal would be blocked by the Baker administration in 2015 which officially canceled all plans for DMU service at West Station and all other lines. By 2016, the station was scheduled to begin construction in 2019 and to be completed along with the highway project. Earlier estimates suggested a 3-4 year construction time. State legislators representing communities along the Worcester Line have expressed concern that Boston Landing and West Station would slow down trips for suburban commuters.

In December 2017, the state announced that the station would not be completed until 2040, after the Harvard-owned land has been redeveloped. The projected cost of the station had increased to $95 million by that time due to the addition of a bus transfer level and other scope increases. In response to a plea from city and state politicians, in January 2018, Harvard University increased its pledge to pay $50 million of the cost, with an additional $8 million incentive to build an early action interim station. The Turnpike straightening is proceeding regardless due to the deteriorating state of the existing viaduct.

=== Allston Multimodal Project ===
Planning for the Turnpike straightening project (since renamed to the Allston Multimodal Project) would once again change in the 2020s, including plans for West Station. Significant design revisions have included reducing the station's track infrastructure and eliminating a proposed layover yard. Funding for the project was bolstered by contributions from Harvard University ($90 million) and Boston University ($10 million). The station's updated design now integrates new connections to the Grand Junction rail line, as well as enhanced pedestrian and bicycle pathways.

In August 2023, the City of Boston, Harvard, and Boston University have pledged $300 million toward the $1.9 billion I-90 Allston Multimodal Project, which includes developing a new neighborhood and West Station on land largely owned by Harvard. This funding, the largest third-party contribution to a state transportation project, will complement federal grants and state investments, with construction set to begin in 2027. The project aims to eliminate an elevated section of the Massachusetts Turnpike. The Allston Multimodal Project is projected for completion by the mid-2030s.

In November 2024, MassDOT reinstated the proposal for a new layover yard within West Station plans.
