= Westborough station =

Train station in Westborough, Massachusetts, US

Westborough
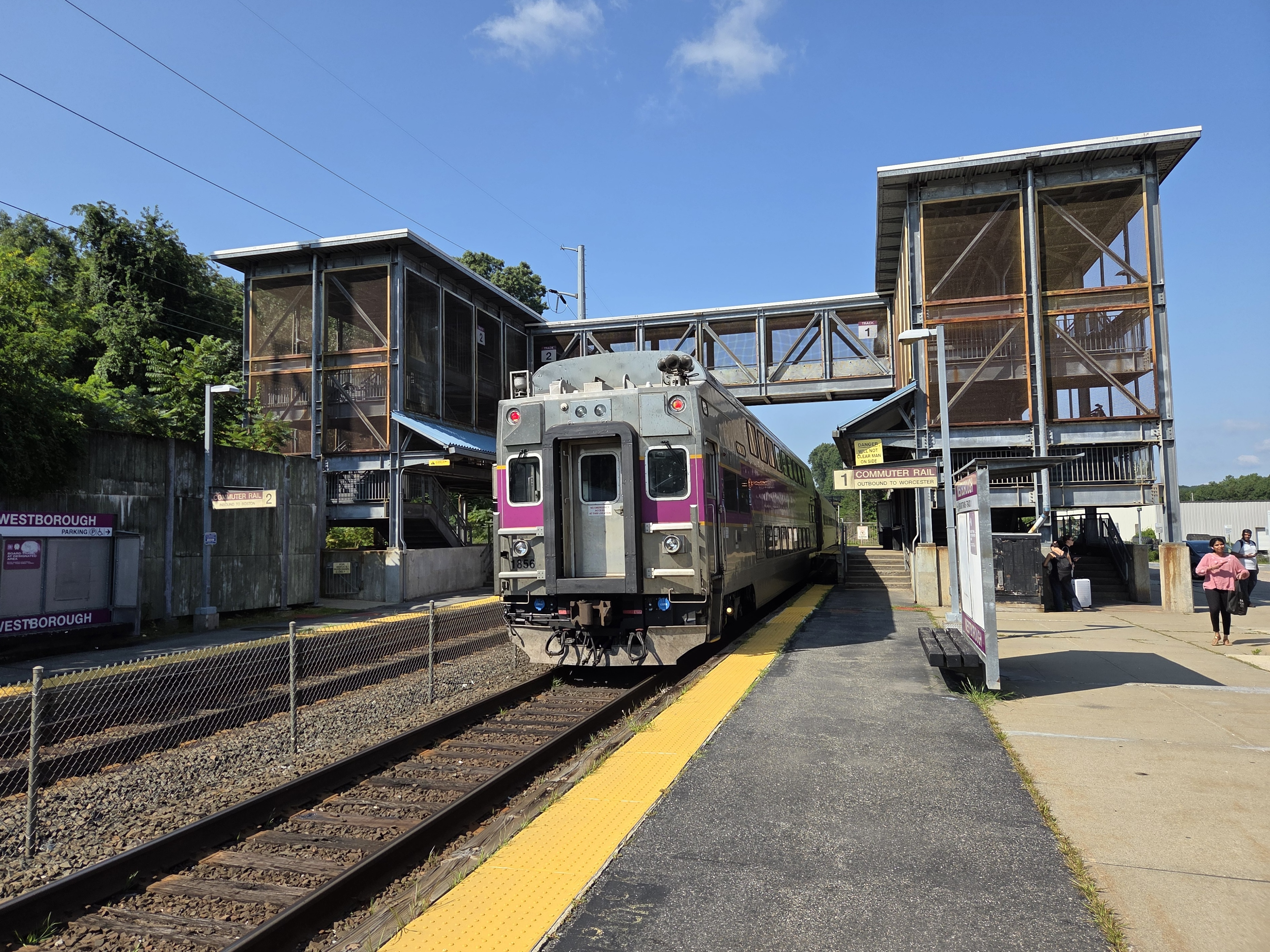
- An outbound train leaving the station in 2026

General information
- Location: Smith Parkway and Fisher Street; Westborough, Massachusetts
- Coordinates: 42.2696°N 71.6473°W
- Line: Worcester Main Line
- Platforms: 2 side platforms
- Tracks: 2

Construction
- Parking: 448 spaces
- Cycle facilities: 4 spaces
- Accessible: Yes

Other information
- Fare zone: 7

History
- Opened: June 22, 2002

Passengers
- 2024: 409 daily boardings

Services
Preceding station	MBTA	Following station
Grafton toward Worcester	Framingham/Worcester Line	Southborough toward South Station
Former services
Preceding station	New York Central Railroad	Following station
Worcester toward Albany	Boston and Albany Railroad Main Line	Cordaville toward Boston
North Grafton toward Albany	Boston and Albany Railroad Main Line	Cordaville toward Boston
Location

Westborough station is an MBTA Commuter Rail station in Westborough, Massachusetts. It serves the Framingham/Worcester Line. It is located off Smith Parkway, west of the Westborough town center. The station consists of two side platforms serving the line's two tracks. Each side has a small mini-high platform for accessibility; an overhead ramp structure connects the two platforms.

== History ==
=== B&A station ===
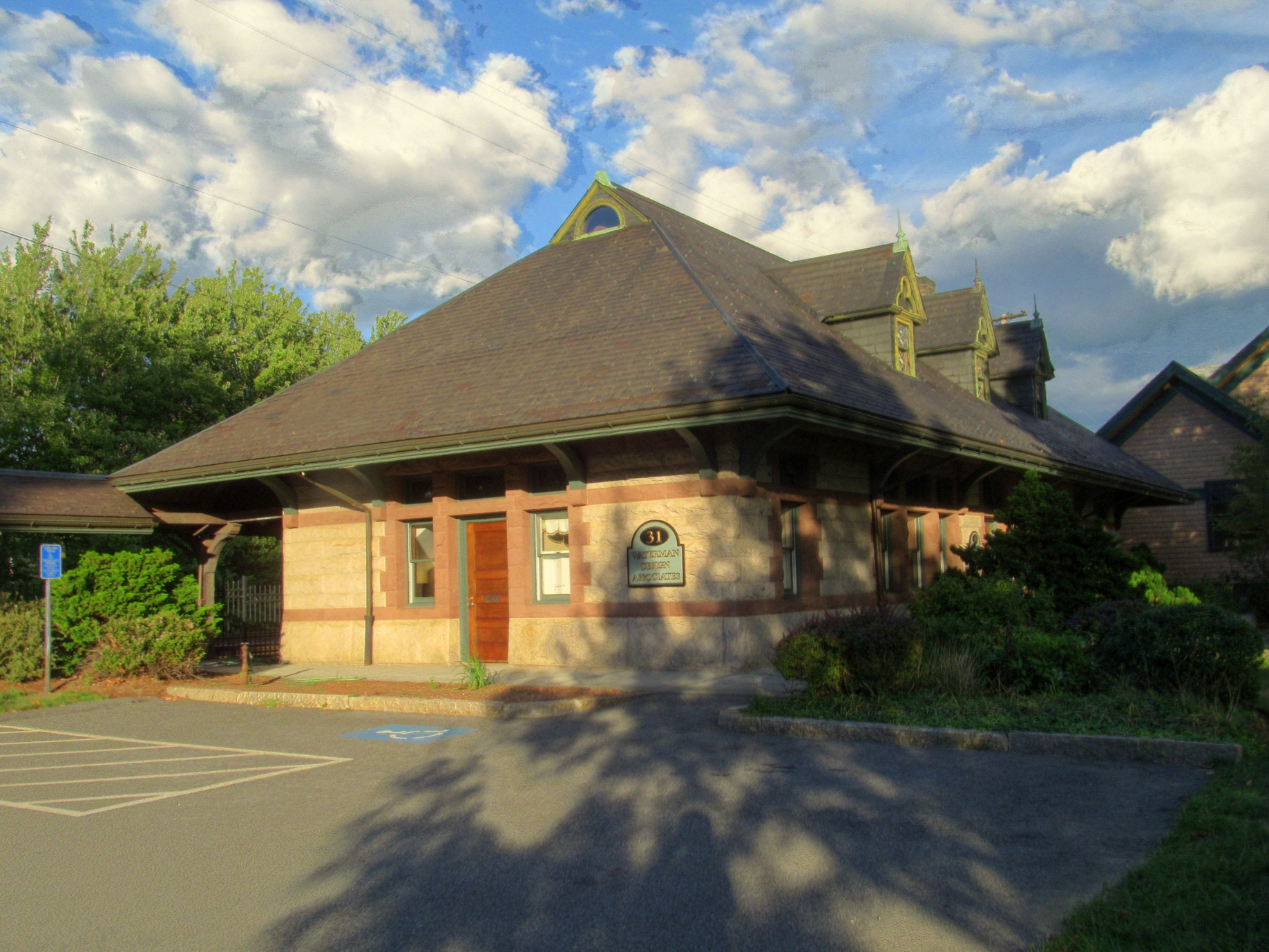
The 1899-built Westborough station in 2016 after restoration

The Boston and Worcester Railroad (B&W) opened from Boston to Westborough on November 17, 1834, and on to Worcester the next July. The line ran through the town center, with a station east of Main Street. Westborough was a station stop by 1838.

In 1898, the Boston and Albany Railroad, successor to the B&W, began a project to eliminate dangerous grade crossings in downtown Westborough. The railroad built 1.5 miles (2.4 km) of tracks on a new alignment north of the downtown area. A new station was built in a Richardsonian Romanesque style, but designed by a B&A architect rather than the firm of Shepley, Rutan, and Coolidge which had designed stations for the B&A until 1894.

On April 24, 1960, the New York Central sharply cut services on the former B&A line. All local stops west of Framingham, including Westborough, were eliminated. Amtrak planned to stop its Bay State at Westborough in 1972, but the stop was never actually put in place. Commuter service to Worcester ended in 1975, replaced by a single daily Amtrak train which did not stop between Framingham and Worcester. The station building was purchased by an abrasives company but largely unused, and fell into disrepair. A local civil engineering firm purchased the station in January 2000 and restored it for use as their offices, which opened in February 2001.

=== MBTA station ===
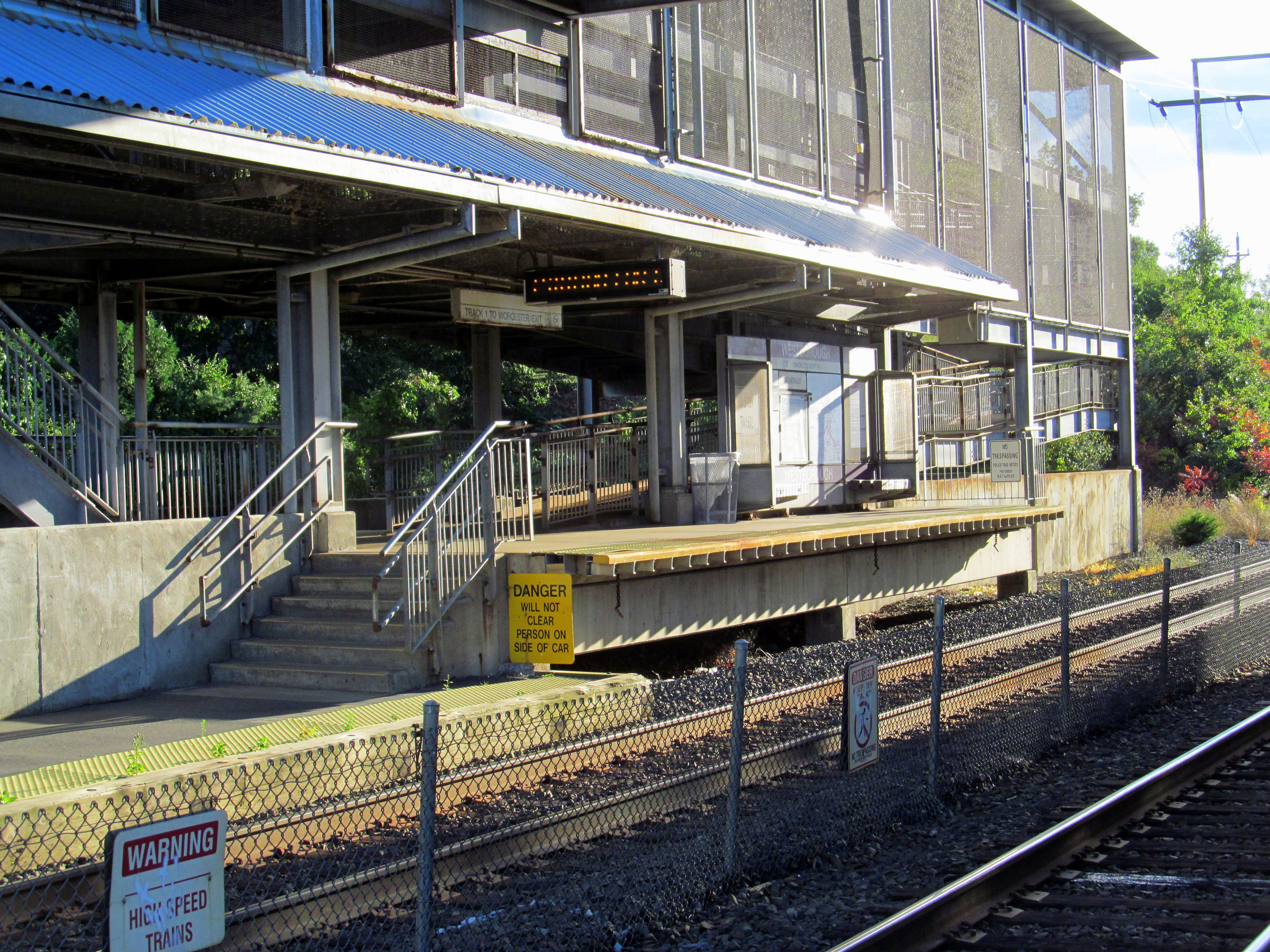
The eastbound mini-high platform

In 1994, service to Worcester was restored as mitigation for delays with reopening the Old Colony Lines. Service initially ran nonstop from Framingham to Worcester, but intermediate park and ride stops were added later as mitigation for delays in reopening the Greenbush Line. After the opening of Grafton in 2000 caused traffic congestion in the town, officials from Ashland, Southborough, and Westborough asked that their three stations open within a 90-day span to avoid overwhelming any one town with traffic. The three stations, which together cost $14.2 million, were originally scheduled to open on December 31, 2001. However, they were delayed by several factors, including a debate on whether to build full-length high-level platforms. Those were ruled out because they interfere with freight traffic; instead, smaller "mini-high" platforms plus long low platforms were built. Southborough and Westborough opened on June 22, 2002, followed by Ashland on August 24.

It is not located as the former station site, but instead to the west of downtown Westborough, closer to busy Route 9. The $4.9 million station originally included 311 parking spaces. Due to high demand, an additional 142-space lot costing $500,000 was opened on December 28, 2005.
