= Southborough station =

Railroad station in Southborough, Massachusetts

Southborough
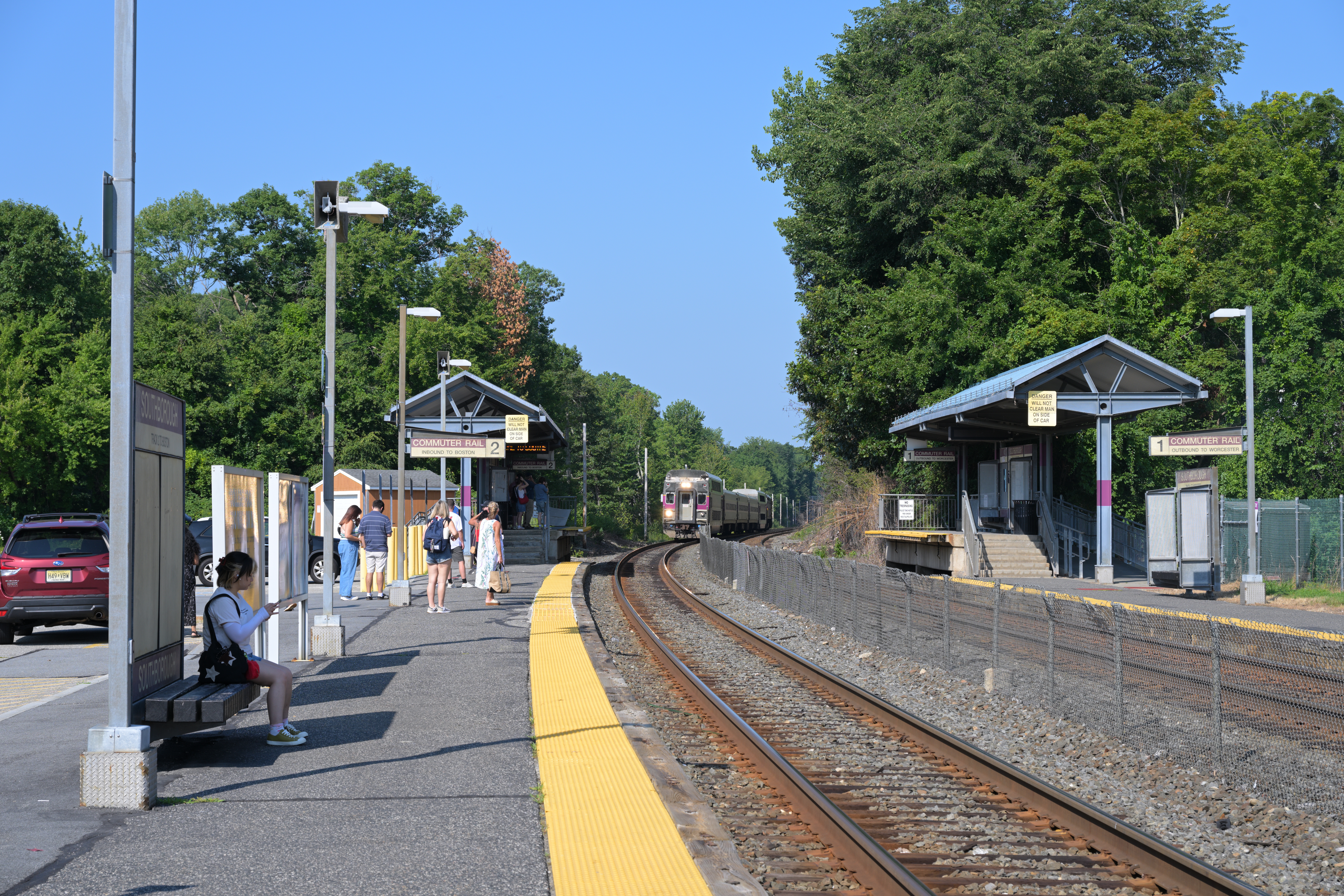
- Southborough station in 2026

General information
- Location: 87 Southville Road; Southborough, Massachusetts
- Coordinates: 42.2669°N 71.5250°W
- Line: Worcester Main Line
- Platforms: 2 side platforms
- Tracks: 2
- Connections: MWRTA: 302, 309, 495

Construction
- Parking: 372 spaces
- Accessible: Yes

Other information
- Fare zone: 6

History
- Opened: June 22, 2002
- Former names: Cordaville

Passengers
- 2024: 425 daily boardings

Services
Preceding station	MBTA	Following station
Westborough toward Worcester	Framingham/Worcester Line	Ashland toward South Station
Former services
Preceding station	New York Central Railroad	Following station
Westborough toward Albany	Boston and Albany Railroad Main Line	Ashland toward Boston
Westborough toward Albany	Boston and Albany Railroad Main Line	Southville toward Boston
Location

Southborough station is a commuter rail station on the MBTA Commuter Rail Framingham/Worcester Line, located near the intersection of Cordaville Street and River Street (Route 85) in the Cordaville section of Southborough, Massachusetts. The parking area is located off River Street adjacent to the inbound platform. Passengers use ramps and stairways to access the sidewalk along River Street to cross under the tracks.

== History ==
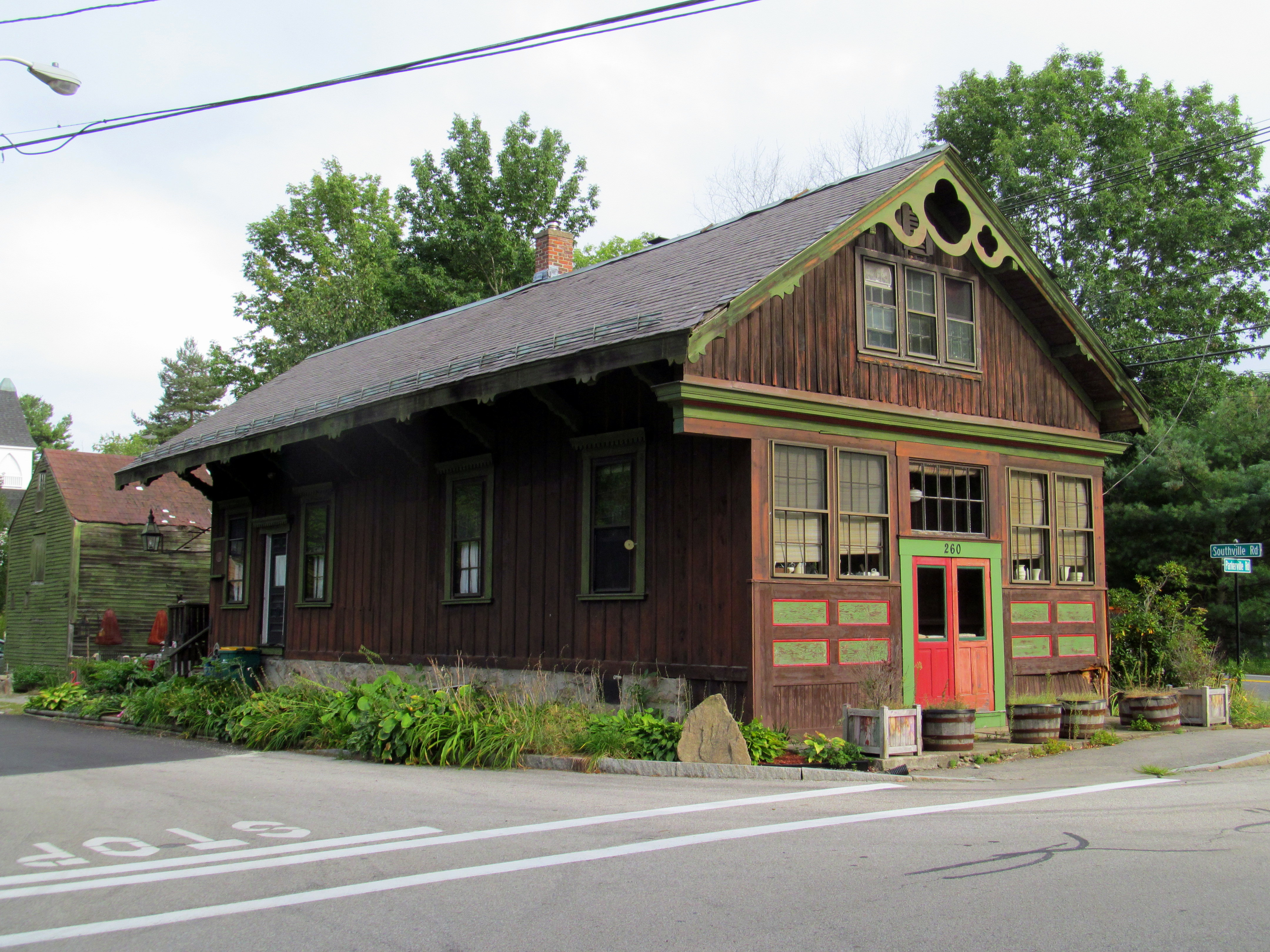
The original Southville station, formerly located 0.7 miles (1.1 km) to the west, is now a private residence. The building was moved from its location south of the tracks in 1890.

A station at Southborough (later called Southville) was in use by 1838. The station was rebuilt in 1852, and a new station at Cordaville was added. Service to both stations lasted until 1960.

In 1994, service to Worcester was restored as mitigation for delays with reopening the Old Colony Lines. Service initially ran nonstop from Framingham to Worcester, but intermediate park and ride stops were added later as mitigation for delays in reopening the Greenbush Line. After the opening of Grafton in 2000 caused traffic congestion in the town, officials from Ashland, Southborough, and Westborough asked that their three stations open within a 90-day span to avoid overwhelming any one town with traffic. The three stations, which together cost $14.2 million, were originally scheduled to open on December 31, 2001. However, they were delayed by several factors, including a debate on whether to build full-length high-level platforms. Those were ruled out because they interfere with freight traffic; instead, smaller "mini-high" platforms plus long low platforms were built. Southborough and Westborough opened on June 22, 2002, followed by Ashland on August 24.

A shuttle service connecting the station with two locations in Marlborough began on September 16, 2019. It was transferred to the MetroWest Regional Transit Authority on July 1, 2026.
