= Ashland station (MBTA) =

Railway station in Ashland, Massachusetts, US

Ashland
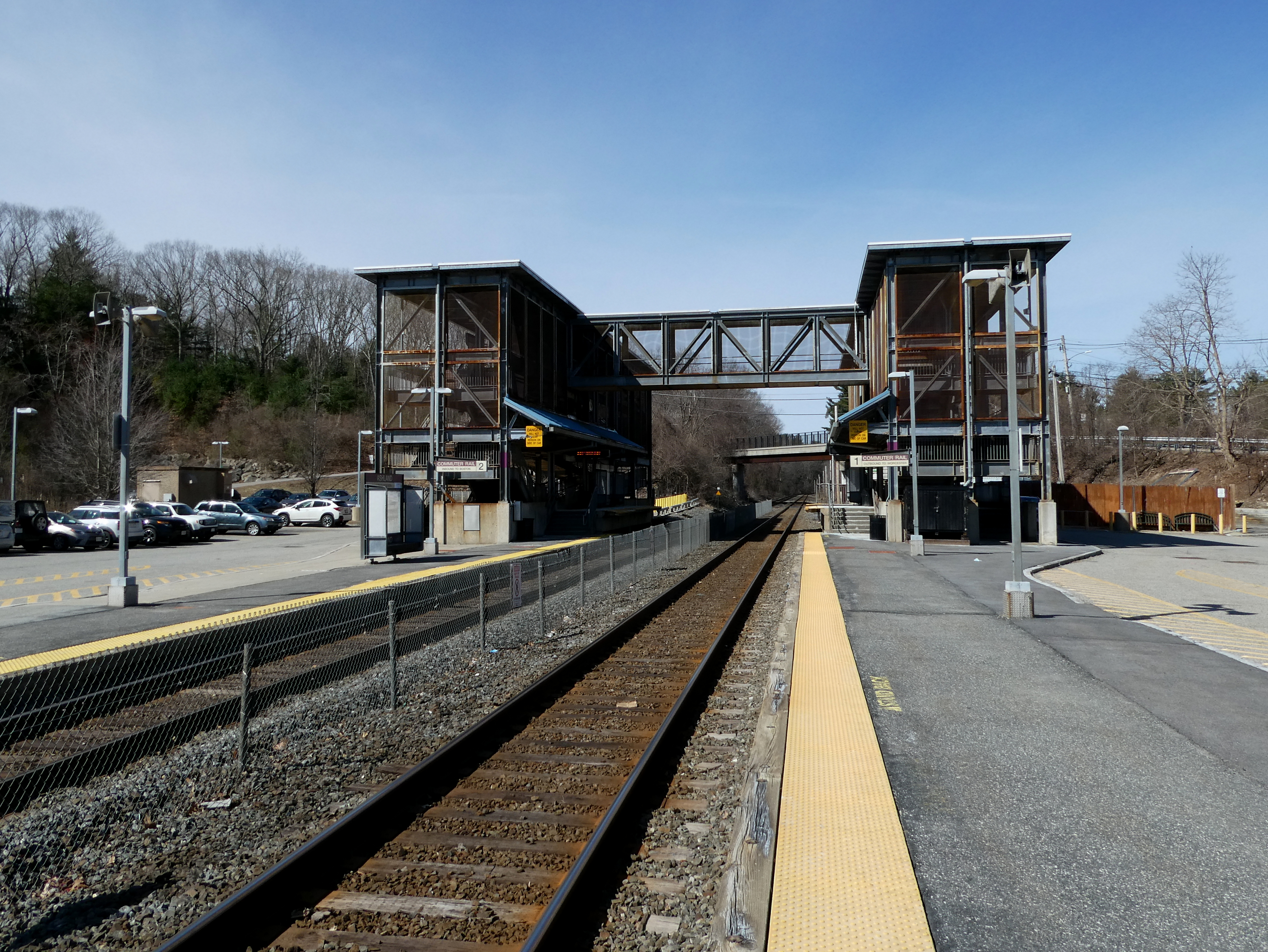
- Ashland station in March 2022

General information
- Location: Pleasant Street near High Street; Ashland, Massachusetts
- Coordinates: 42.2616°N 71.4826°W
- Line: Worcester Main Line
- Platforms: 2 side platforms
- Tracks: 2
- Connections: MWRTA: 5

Construction
- Parking: 693 spaces
- Accessible: Yes

Other information
- Fare zone: 6

History
- Opened: August 24, 2002

Passengers
- 2024: 393 daily boardings

Services
Preceding station	MBTA	Following station
Southborough toward Worcester	Framingham/Worcester Line	Framingham toward South Station
Former services
Preceding station	New York Central Railroad	Following station
Cordaville toward Albany	Boston and Albany Railroad Main Line	Framingham toward Boston
Location

Ashland station is an MBTA Commuter Rail station in Ashland, Massachusetts. It serves the Framingham/Worcester Line. It has a long driveway leading from the south parking lot to the intersection of West Union Street (Route 135) and Voyagers Lane. Like the other stations on the line west of Framingham, Ashland serves as a park-and-ride station with 678 parking spots.

== History ==
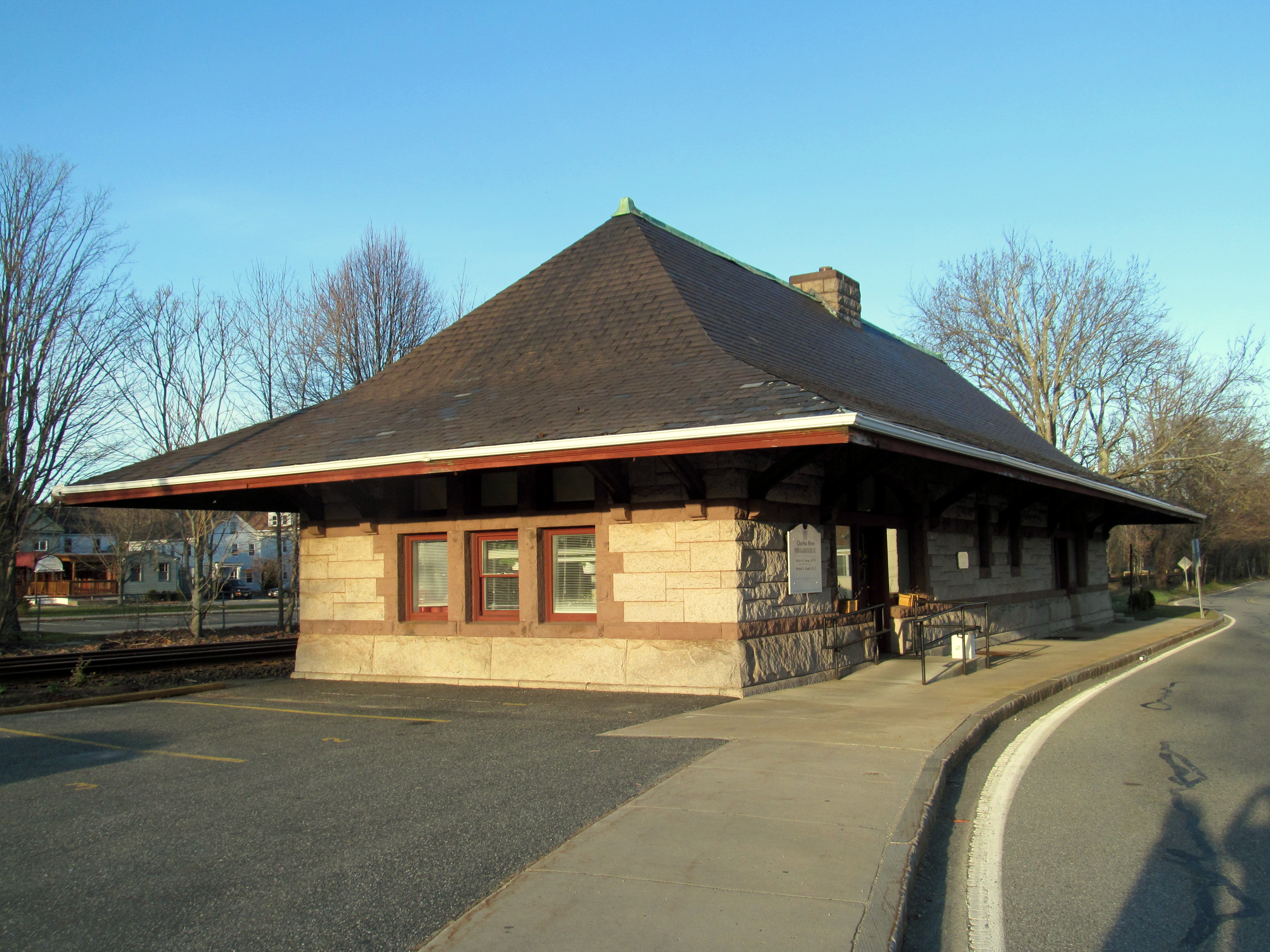
The previous downtown station photographed in 2016

A station at Unionville (later Ashland, after the town separated from Hopkinton in 1846) was in use by 1838. Improvements to the station were made around 1846. Passenger service to the old Shepley, Rutan and Coolidge–built downtown station ended on April 24, 1960, when Boston and Albany Railroad service west of Framingham was cut to stops at Worcester, Palmer, Springfield, and Pittsfield only. Service to Worcester ended entirely in 1975, but resumed in 1994.

In 1994, service to Worcester was restored as mitigation for delays with reopening the Old Colony Lines. Service initially ran nonstop from Framingham to Worcester, but intermediate park and ride stops were added later as mitigation for delays in reopening the Greenbush Line. After the opening of Grafton in 2000 caused traffic congestion in the town, officials from Ashland, Southborough, and Westborough asked that their three stations open within a 90-day span to avoid overwhelming any one town with traffic. The three stations, which together cost $14.2 million, were originally scheduled to open on December 31, 2001. However, they were delayed by several factors, including a debate on whether to build full-length high-level platforms. Those were ruled out because they interfere with freight traffic; instead, smaller "mini-high" platforms plus long low platforms were built.

Southborough and Westborough opened on June 22, 2002, followed by Ashland on August 24. Construction of the station cost $7.4 million. Although the town originally insisted on no more than 450 parking spaces in an attempt to limit traffic on Route 135, officials later agreed to the MBTA's plans for a 700-space lot. The new station was built to the west of the town center, where land was available for large parking lots. The downtown station still stands, and is currently used as a doctor's office.

A $2.5 million renovation including restoration of the footbridge and resurfacing of the platforms took place in 2023. The station was temporarily closed on August 26 from to December 23, 2023.
