= MetroWest Regional Transit Authority =

Bus and paratransit service in Massachusetts

MetroWest Regional Transit Authority (MWRTA)

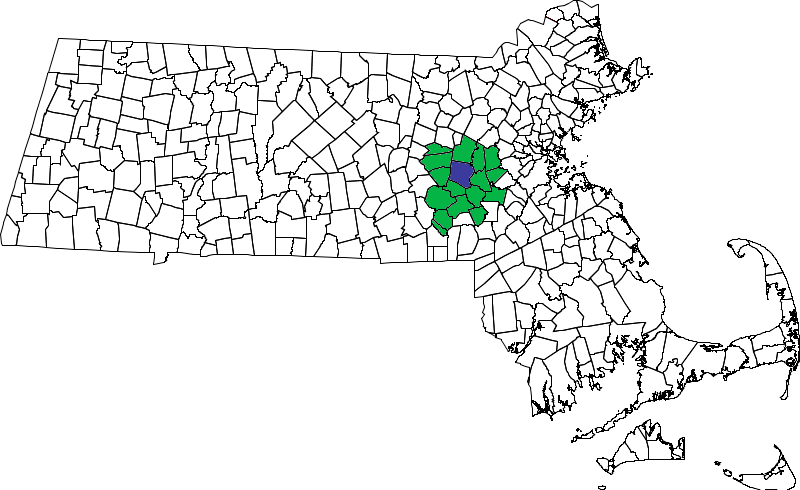
- Map of the MetroWest Regional Transit Authority (MWRTA) service area in green with the central hub town of Framingham in blue.
- Founded: 2006
- Headquarters: 15 Blandin Avenue, Framingham, Massachusetts, U.S.
- Locale: MetroWest, Massachusetts
- Service area: Ashland; Dover; Framingham; Holliston; Hopedale; Hopkinton; Hudson; Marlborough; Milford; Natick; Sherborn; Southborough; Sudbury; Wayland; Wellesley; Weston; Millis
- Service type: Bus; paratransit
- Routes: 29
- Hubs: Framingham, Massachusetts
- Fleet: Ford E-Series cutaways
- Annual ridership: 747,451 (2025)
- Operator: Keolis
- Administrator: Jim Nee
- Website: mwrta.com

The MetroWest Regional Transit Authority (MWRTA) is a regional public transit authority in the state of Massachusetts providing bus and paratransit service to seventeen municipalities in the Boston MetroWest. The MWRTA was formed in 2006 and began service on July 1, 2007, with the purpose of filling a void in public transportation service in the MetroWest. Funding for the MWRTA comes partially from the state and local governments of the communities it operates within.

== Service ==
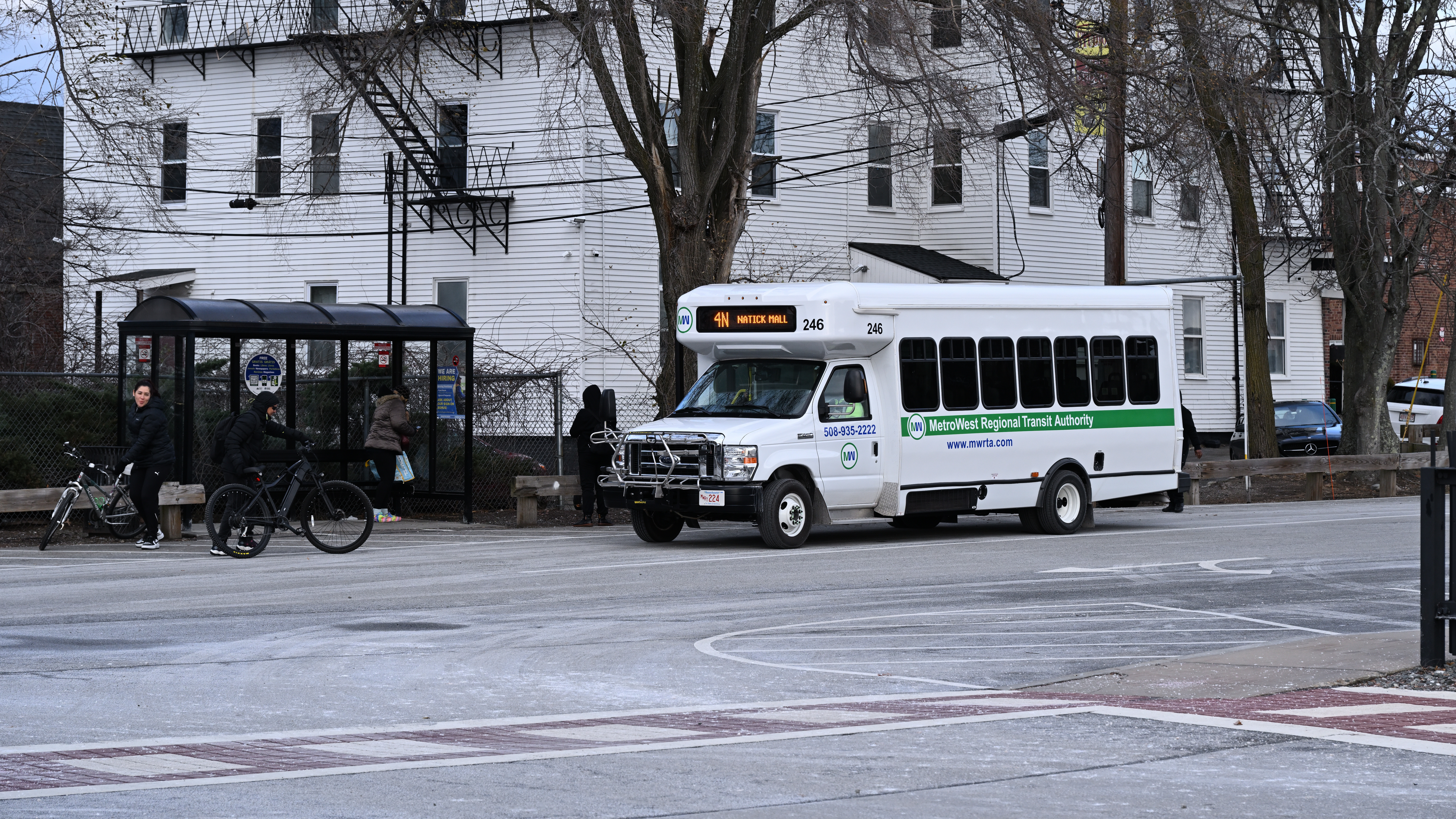
A route 4N bus at the "Banana Lot" next to Framingham station in 2025

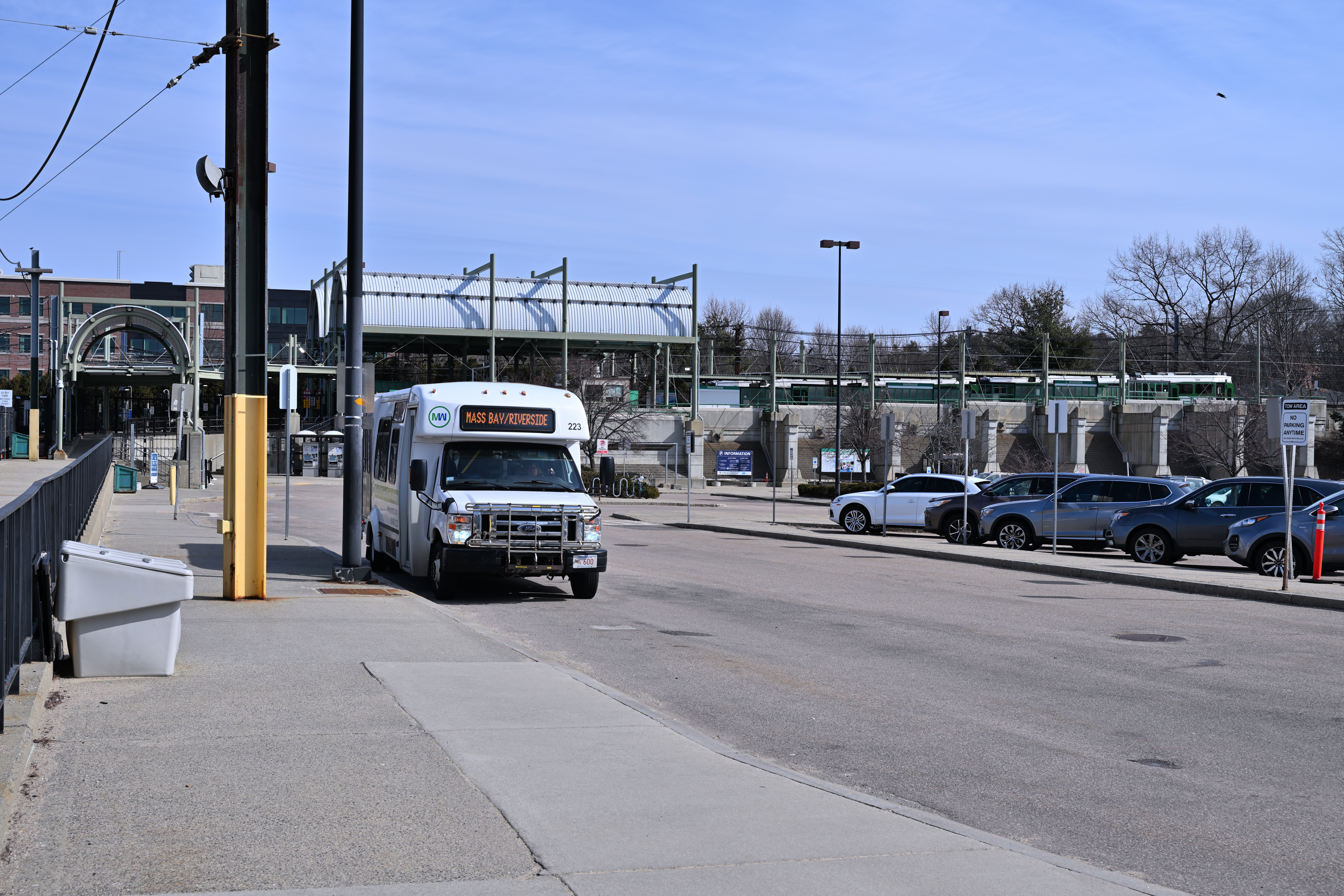
A MassBay Riverside shuttle at Riverside station in 2025

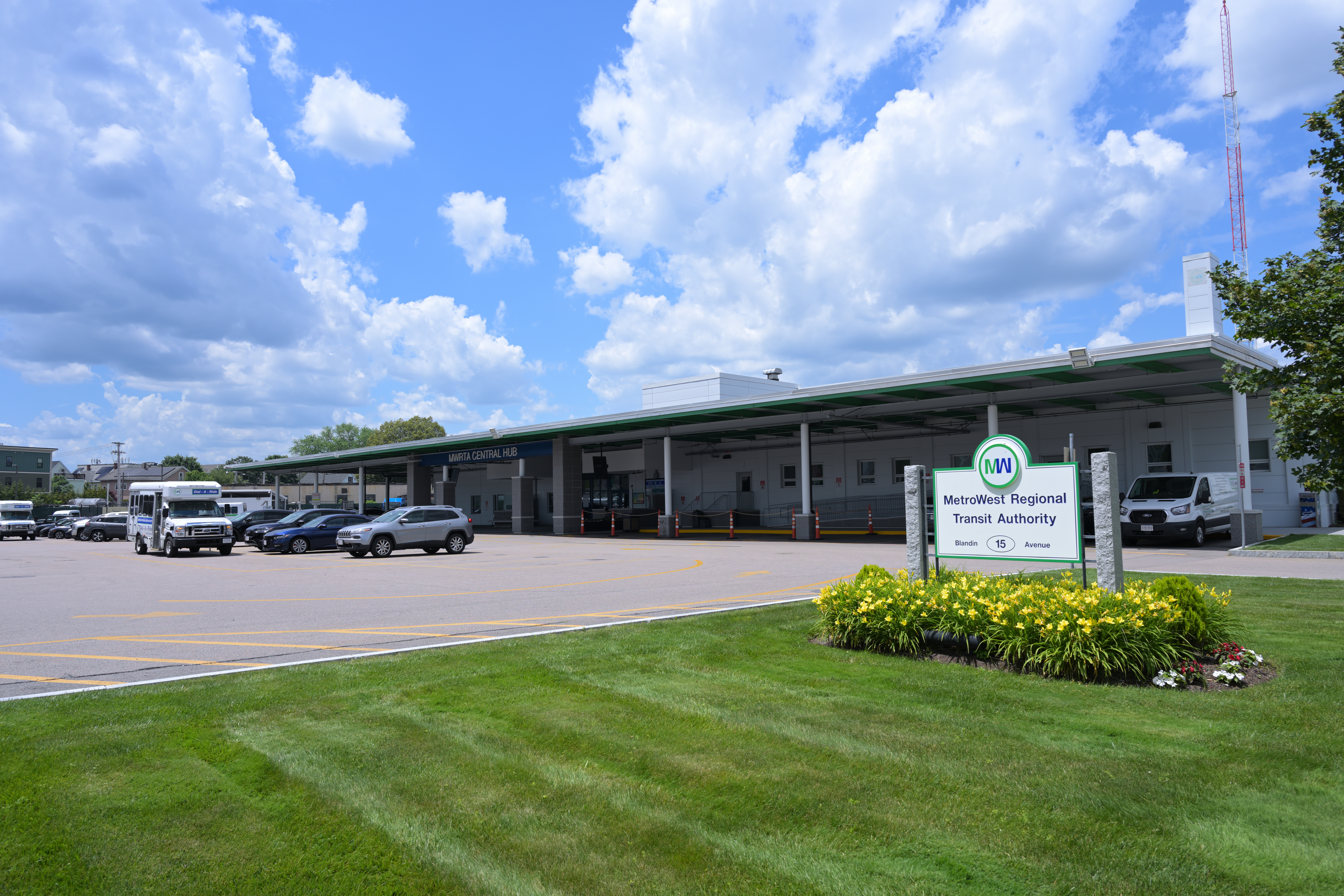
The MWRTA Blandin Avenue hub in Framingham

=== Routes ===
As of 2026, the MWRTA operates 24 fixed routes that provide all-day service. Most operate seven days a week; routes 102, 206, 302, 309, 495, and the MassBay shuttles do not operate on weekends.

- 101: Banana Lot to Framingham Center via Franklin Street and Union Avenue
- 102: Blandin Hub to Natick Mall via Bishop and Hartford Streets
- 103: Blandin Hub to Saxonville via Route 126
- 104: Blandin Hub to Market Basket Ashland
- 105: Blandin Hub to Golden Triangle
- 107: Banana Lot to NY Avenue / Staples via Route 9
- 108: Downtown Marlborough Loop
- 201: Woodland Station to Natick Mall via Wellesley Square and Route 9
- 202: Natick Center MBTA to Ashland MBTA via Route 135
- 203: Nobscot to Natick Mall via Warren Road and Edgell Road
- 204: Marlborough Shaw's to Target via Route 20
- 206: West Natick MBTA to Natick Mall via Routes 135, 27, and 9
- 207: Banana Lot to Downtown Marlborough via Pleasant Street and Route 85
- 301: Nobscot to Natick Center MBTA via Water Street and Route 27
- 302: Marlborough Commuter Shuttle
- 304: Milford Library to Milford Crossing via South Main, Prospect, and Dilla Streets
- 305: Blandin Hub to Dell Hopkinton via Routes 126/135 and South Street
- 306: Blandin Hub to Milford Library via Routes 16/126
- 309: Southborough MBTA to Natick Mall via Routes 9 and 85
- 495: Forge Park MBTA to South Acton MBTA
- MassBay Campus Shuttle
- MassBay Riverside Shuttle

As of 2026, the MWRTA operates 3 commuter shuttles that run Monday–Friday at peak hours, plus two hospital shuttles with limited Tuesday–Thursday service.

- 495 Connector
- Marlborough Commuter Shuttle
- Mathworks Natick Shuttle
- MathWorks Framingham Shuttle
- Framingham Natick Wellesley Boston Hospital Shuttle
- Sudbury Wayland Boston Hospital Shuttle

=== Paratransit ===
Per ADA requirements, the MWRTA provides paratransit service, which is branded as MetroWest Ride.

=== Microtransit ===
The MWRTA operates a microtransit service branded as Catch Connect. As of 2025, it is available in Wellesley, Sudbury, Hudson, Berlin, Framingham, Natick, Milford, and Hopedale, plus several destinations in other municipalities.

== History ==
In 2006, an Economic Stimulus Bill passed in the Commonwealth of Massachusetts included legislation pushed by Karen Spilka and other MetroWest area legislators. The legislation opened the possibility of a new Regional Transit Authority to be formed in the MetroWest region. The legislation states that any community providing an annual assessment to the Massachusetts Bay Transportation Authority (MBTA) but not served directly by the MBTA may form their own Regional Transit Authority (RTA) using that funding instead.

Under the advisement of the legislation, the MWRTA was created in Framingham with the neighboring communities of Holliston, Hopkinton, Natick, Ashland, and Wayland. At the time, Framingham had its own community bus system called The LIFT (Local Inter Framingham Transit).The newly formed MWRTA was based on The LIFT. With this system, the communities of the MWRTA would have a basis for their new RTA.

As part of the growth of the MWRTA and due to Natick joining the system, Natick's own Neighborhood Bus system was incorporated into the MWRTA in the summer of 2008. Prior to the creation of the MWRTA, the Massachusetts Bay Transportation Authority (MBTA) provided part of its paratransit service, called The Ride to Framingham and Natick. On July 1, 2009, administration of paratransit service to Framingham and Natick switched from the MBTA to MWRTA in alignment with the change in assessments paid to the MWRTA by those communities rather than to the MBTA.

MWRTA began microtransit service branded as Catch Connect in Wellesley in February 2021. It replaced fixed route 8 the next month. The service was expanded to Framingham and Natick on weekends beginning in July 2021. Saturday-only Catch Connect service in Hudson and part of Marlborough began in June 2022; it was expanded to weekdays in June 2023.

The MWRTA acquired larger 29-foot (8.8 m) transit buses in 2025 for use on route 4N, the system's busiest route. Millis joined the MWRTA in April 2026. The Marlborough Commuter Shuttle was transferred from the Marlborough Economic Development Corporation to the MWRTA effective July 1, 2026. A major reconfiguration of the MWRTA network took effect on September 8, 2026.
