= Framingham station =

Railroad station in Framingham, Massachusetts, USA

Framingham
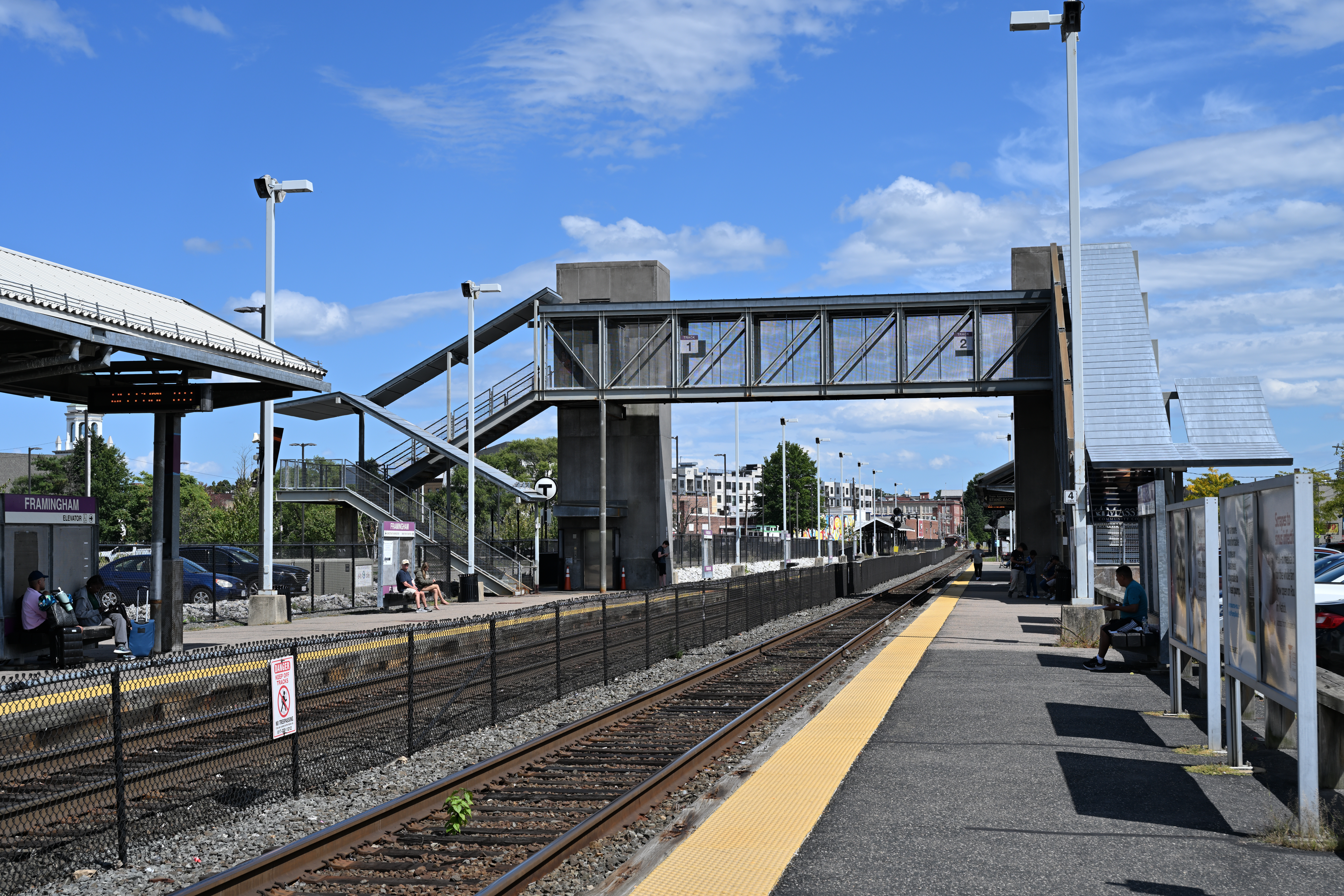
- Framingham station in September 2024

General information
- Location: 417 Waverly Street; Framingham, Massachusetts; United States
- Coordinates: 42.27624°N 71.41962°W
- Owner: Massachusetts Bay Transportation Authority
- Line: Worcester Main Line
- Platforms: 2 side platforms
- Tracks: 2
- Connections: MWRTA: 2, 3, 4, 5, 6, 7 Greyhound

Construction
- Parking: 294 spaces
- Cycle facilities: 10 spaces
- Accessible: Yes

Other information
- Station code: Amtrak: FRA
- Fare zone: 5 (MBTA)

History
- Opened: 1834
- Rebuilt: 1848, 1885, 2001
- Former names: South Framingham (until January 8, 1915)

Passengers
- FY 2025: 1,321 annual boardings and alightings (Amtrak)
- 2024: 904 daily boardings (MBTA)

Services
Preceding station	Amtrak	Following station
Worcester toward Chicago	Lake Shore Limited	Boston Back Bay toward Boston South
Preceding station	MBTA	Following station
Ashland toward Worcester	Framingham/Worcester Line	West Natick toward South Station
Former services
Preceding station	New York Central Railroad	Following station
Ashland toward Albany	Boston and Albany Railroad Main Line	Natick toward Boston
Whitneys toward Milford	Milford Branch	Terminus
Preceding station	New York, New Haven and Hartford Railroad	Following station
Montwait toward Fitchburg	Agricultural Branch	Terminus
Montwait toward Lowell	Framingham–Lowell	Terminus
Terminus	Framingham–Mansfield	Sherborn toward Mansfield
- Framingham Railroad Station
- U.S. National Register of Historic Places
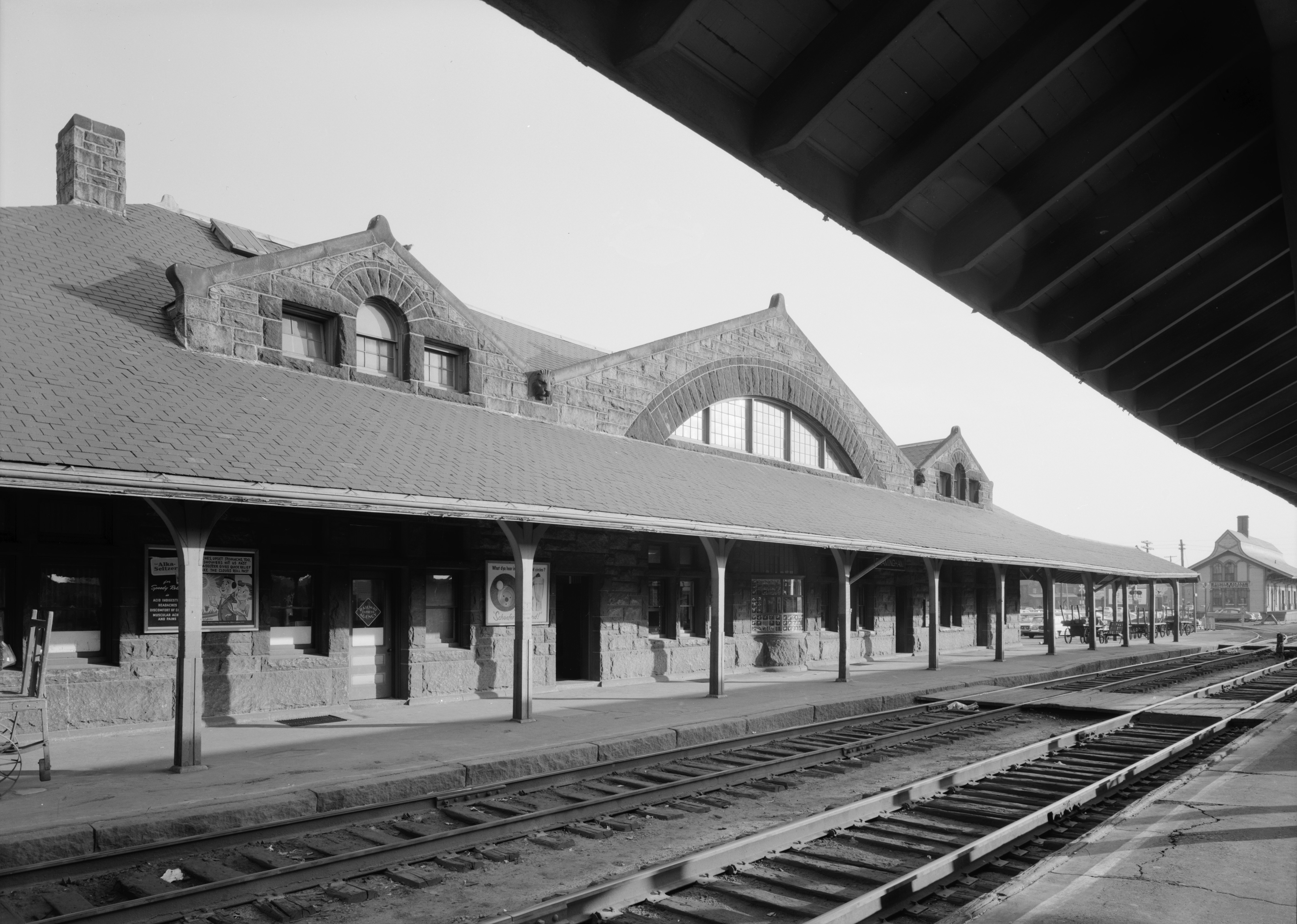
- Framingham station in 1959
- Built: 1885
- Architect: H. H. Richardson
- Architectural style: Richardsonian Romanesque
- NRHP reference No.: 75000258
- Added to NRHP: January 17, 1975
Location

Framingham station is a historic Boston and Albany Railroad station located in downtown Framingham, Massachusetts. Designed by noted American architect H. H. Richardson, it was one of the last of the railroad stations he designed in the northeastern United States to be built. The station, built in 1884–85, served as a major stop on the B&A Main Line as well as a hub for branch lines to Milford, Mansfield, Fitchburg, and Lowell. After years of deterioration, the station was listed on the National Register of Historic Places in 1975 as the Framingham Railroad Station, and restored a decade later.

In 2001, MBTA Framingham/Worcester Line and Amtrak operations were shifted to a new set of platforms nearby, which have high-level sections for handicapped-accessible boarding and a footbridge for crossing the tracks. This new station is among the busiest on the MBTA system, with 41 daily MBTA and 2 Amtrak trains on weekdays. The H. H. Richardson-designed station building remains largely intact and is currently used as a restaurant.

== History ==
=== Boston and Worcester Railroad ===
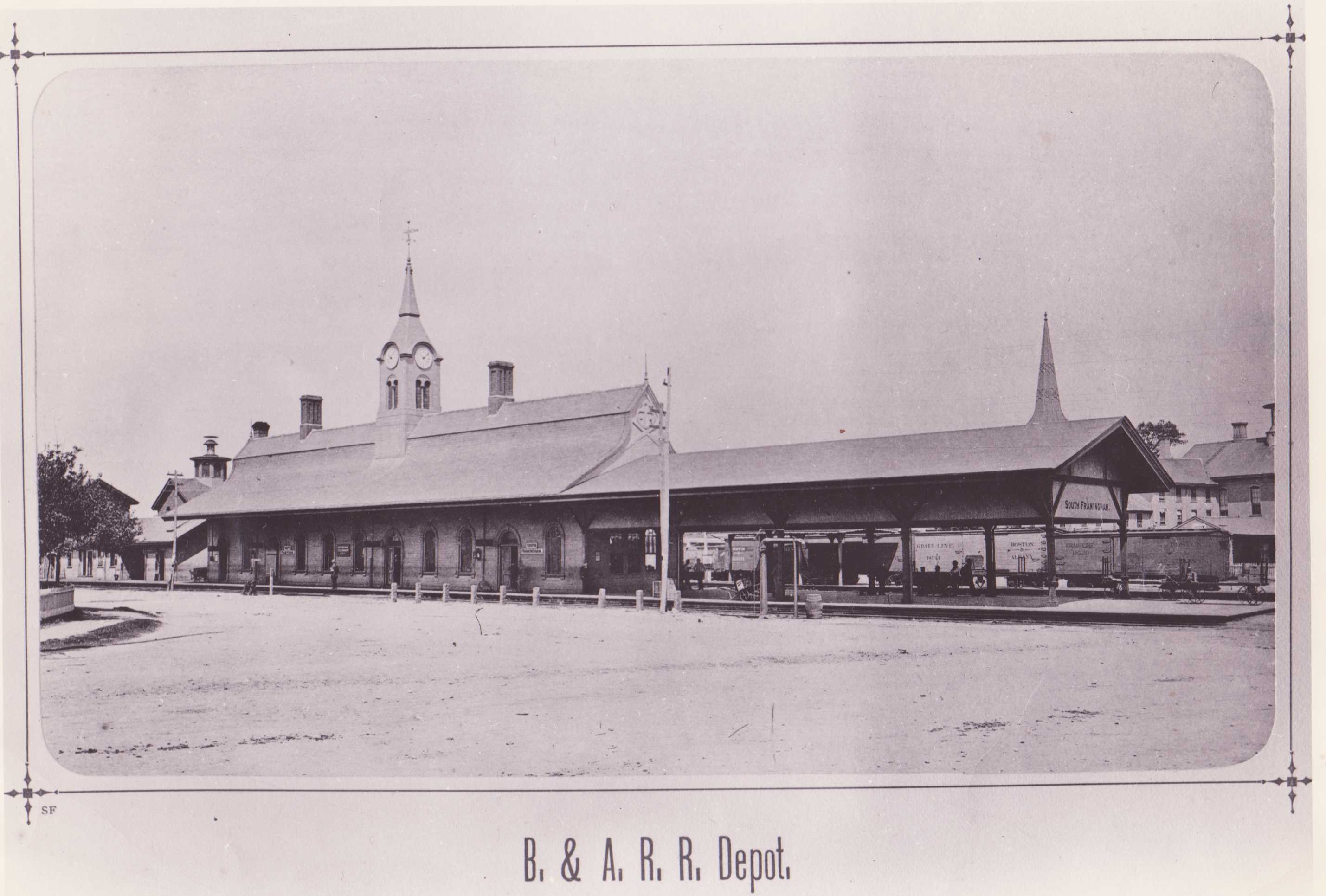
The 1848-built station seen in 1861

The Boston and Worcester Railroad, which had opened from Boston to Newton in April 1834, opened to South Framingham in August 1834. The village's first major station, a 2-story wooden Dutch Colonial structure, was constructed in 1848. After being replaced, it was moved slightly west and converted to a freight house – a function it served until it was demolished in the 1960s.

Over the next several decades, South Framingham became an important regional rail hub. The Boston and Worcester built its 12-mile Milford Branch from South Framingham to Milford via Holliston in 1848. The next year, the B&W built a short branch to Framingham Center, which the B&W mainline had bypassed. This line, later called the Agricultural Branch Railroad, was realigned near Framingham Center and extended to Pratts Junction in Sterling in 1855. Franklin Street was built on the former branch right of way. The Agricultural branch and the Framingham & Lowell (which branched off it at Framingham Center) were the northernmost section of the Old Colony Railroad, which took over the lines in 1879. The Old Colony built a new freight house in 1883.

The Old Colony's access to South Framingham was the Mansfield & Framingham, which opened in 1870 and was also acquired in 1879. By the time of the Old Colony takeover, South Framingham featured the 1848-built station, a freight house, a car house, and three separate engine houses serving the various branch lines. Through service on the mainline operated as far as Albany; the B&W had joined with the Western Railroad in 1867 to become the Boston and Albany Railroad. Framingham began to be used occasionally as a short turn terminus for Boston-bound commuter trains in the early 1860s and continuously as such after 1864. As of August 2015, a small number of Framingham/Worcester Line trains are short-turned at Framingham.

=== H. H. Richardson depot ===
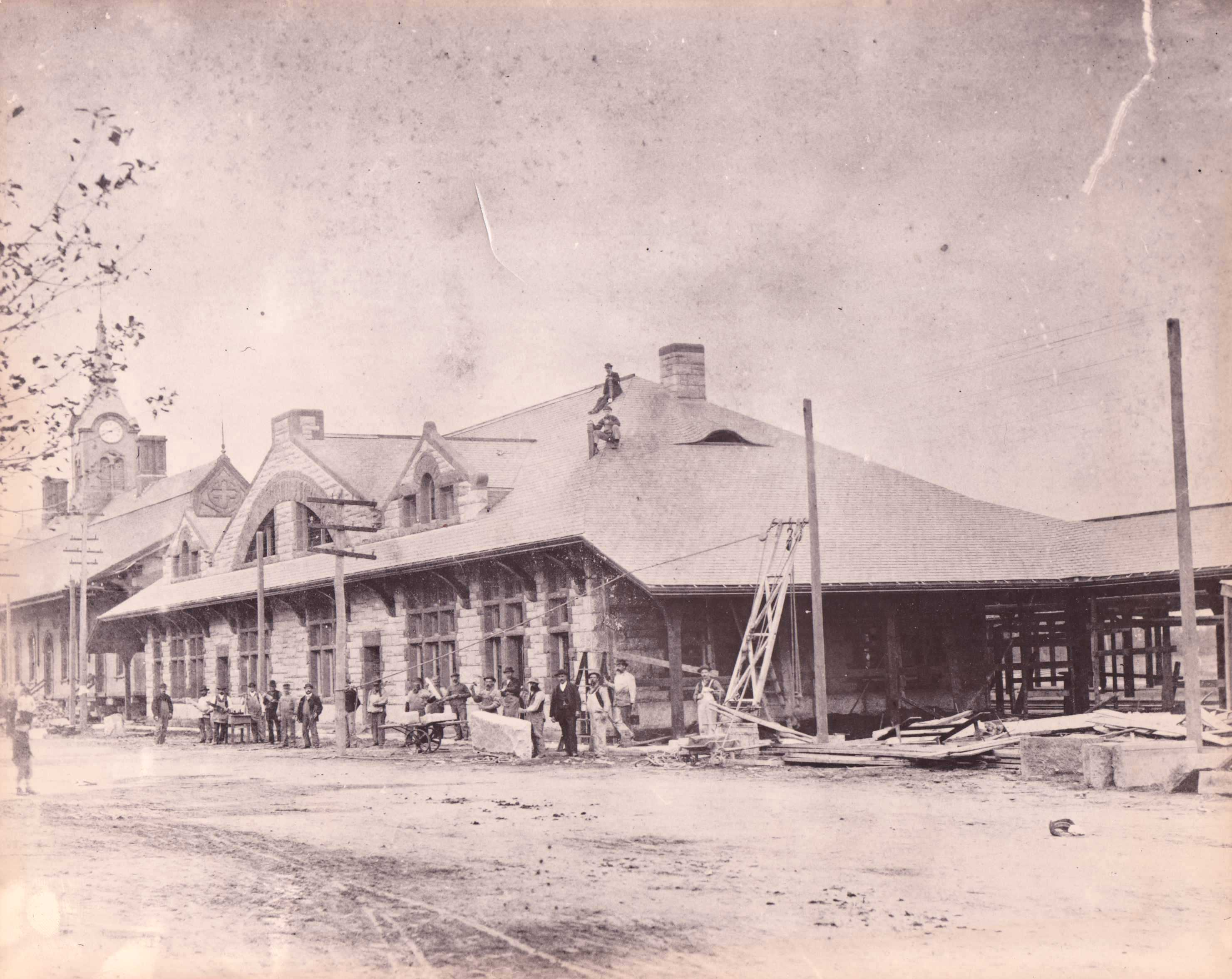
The new station under construction in 1885

Beginning in 1881, the Boston & Albany began a massive improvement program that included the building of over 30 new stations along its main line as well as the Highland branch, which it bought in 1883. Famed architect H. H. Richardson was hired to design nine of these stations, including South Framingham which was commissioned in October 1883. The $62,718 station, built in 1884–85 by the Norcross Brothers company, was the largest and costliest of the nine. The station is a prime example of the Richardsonian Romanesque style, built of rough-hewn granite with contrasting details. The dominant roofline, dormers, arched bow window, and wooden interior are typical of the style. Like many of Richardson's designs, the station was well-praised; Henry-Russell Hitchcock called it a "better and somewhat more personal work" in The Architecture of H. H. Richardson and His Time. A small square baggage room was built in the same style just east of the station, near the Concord Street (Route 126) grade crossing.

The station's importance remained through the first half of the 20th century. After the Boston & Albany was acquired by the New York Central Railroad in 1900, third and fourth tracks were extended in 1907 to South Framingham from Lake Crossing station in Wellesley. In 1911, the NYC considered laying third rail on the main line as far as South Framingham, as well as on the Highland branch, to allow more frequent electric service on the lines. This would have been the only electrified commuter service directly into Boston, as neither the later-electrified Boston, Revere Beach and Lynn Railroad nor experimental electric service on the South Shore Railroad went directly to downtown. However, the plan was abandoned because the infrastructure cost would have exceeded the annual savings on fuel. (In 1959, the Highland branch received catenary wire and was turned into the Green Line D branch).

Due in no small part to the presence of the station, South Framingham eclipsed Framingham Center in size; on January 8, 1915, the station was renamed Framingham. Traffic on the B&A and its various branch lines, though, decreased after World War I. In 1919, Agricultural branch trains were cut to Framingham, requiring a transfer to continue Boston or Mansfield. The line was cut back to Marlborough in 1931, and passenger service ended in 1937. Passenger service on the Mansfield & Framingham ended in 1933. The Milford Branch lasted the longest of the Boston & Albany branch lines; it was cut to one daily trip in 1953 and terminated in April 1959.

=== MBTA era ===
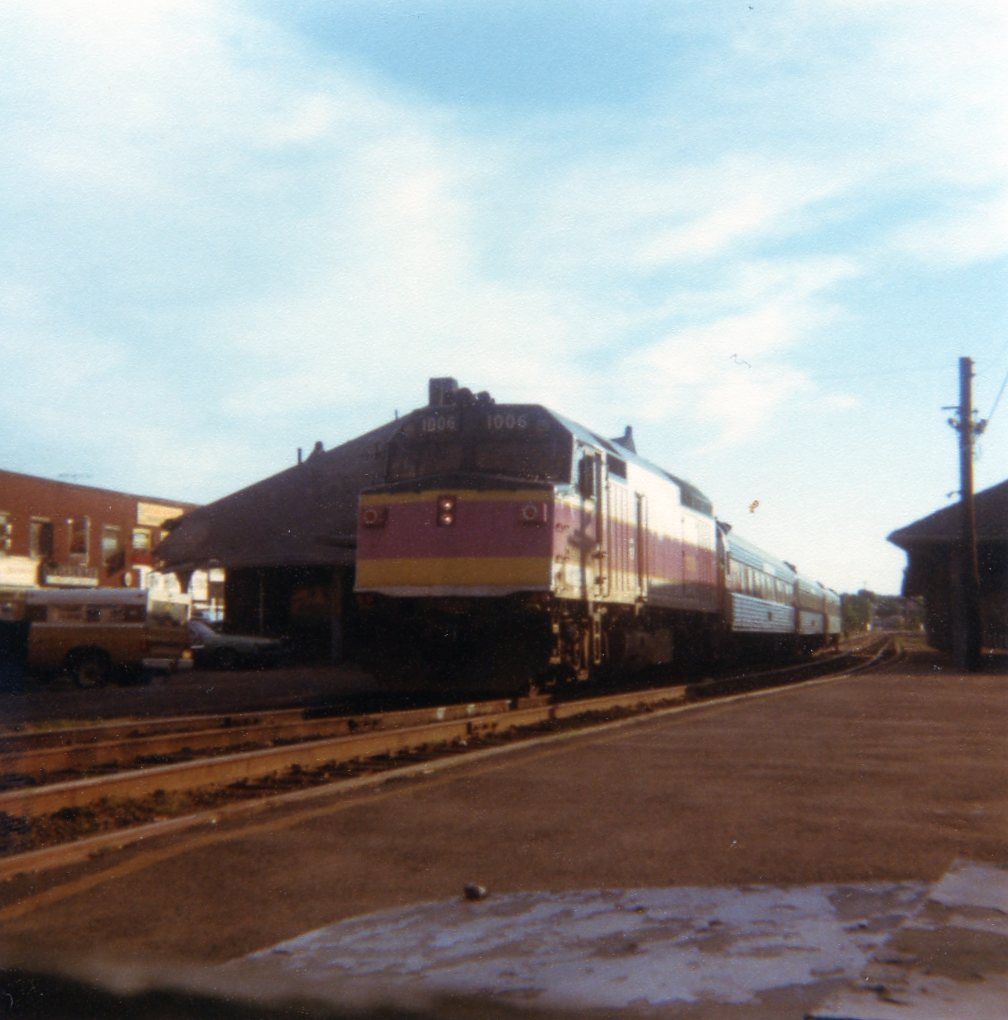
An MBTA train at Framingham in 1977

In January 1960, the New York Central planned to end all service on the line, due to the opening of the Green Line D branch to Riverside in July 1959. However, that April, following public outcry over the planned discontinuation of service, the railroad was ordered to continue limited service, leaving Framingham with 8 daily round trips. When the extension of the Massachusetts Turnpike to downtown Boston began in 1961, the third and fourth tracks were removed. The NYC merged into Penn Central in 1968; by 1969, Framingham saw just 4 daily round trips.

The MBTA began subsidizing service as far as Framingham in January 1973; the last Worcester round trip ended on October 27, 1975, leaving Framingham as the terminus of the line. The modern Amtrak Lake Shore Limited was established 4 days later, and has provided intercity service via Framingham ever since. From 1996 until their 2004 discontinuation, Amtrak Inland Route trains also stopped at Framingham.

By the 1970s, the station had fallen into disrepair; part of the roof collapsed in 1978. On January 17, 1975, the building was added to the National Register of Historic Places as Framingham Railroad Station. The building was restored in 1985, and has been occupied by various restaurants since. The original interior is no longer extant, but the exterior is mostly complete. The small baggage office east of the station building has been converted into a bank ATM.

When the Needham Line was closed in October 1979 for Southwest Corridor construction, service on the Framingham line was increased considerably as partial compensation. By April 1984, the MBTA operated 12.5 daily round trips from Framingham. Service was restored to Worcester on September 26, 1994, as mitigation for delays in reopening the Old Colony Lines (the first two of which finally opened in September 1997) – the first time in 19 years that commuter rail service extended beyond Framingham.

=== New station ===
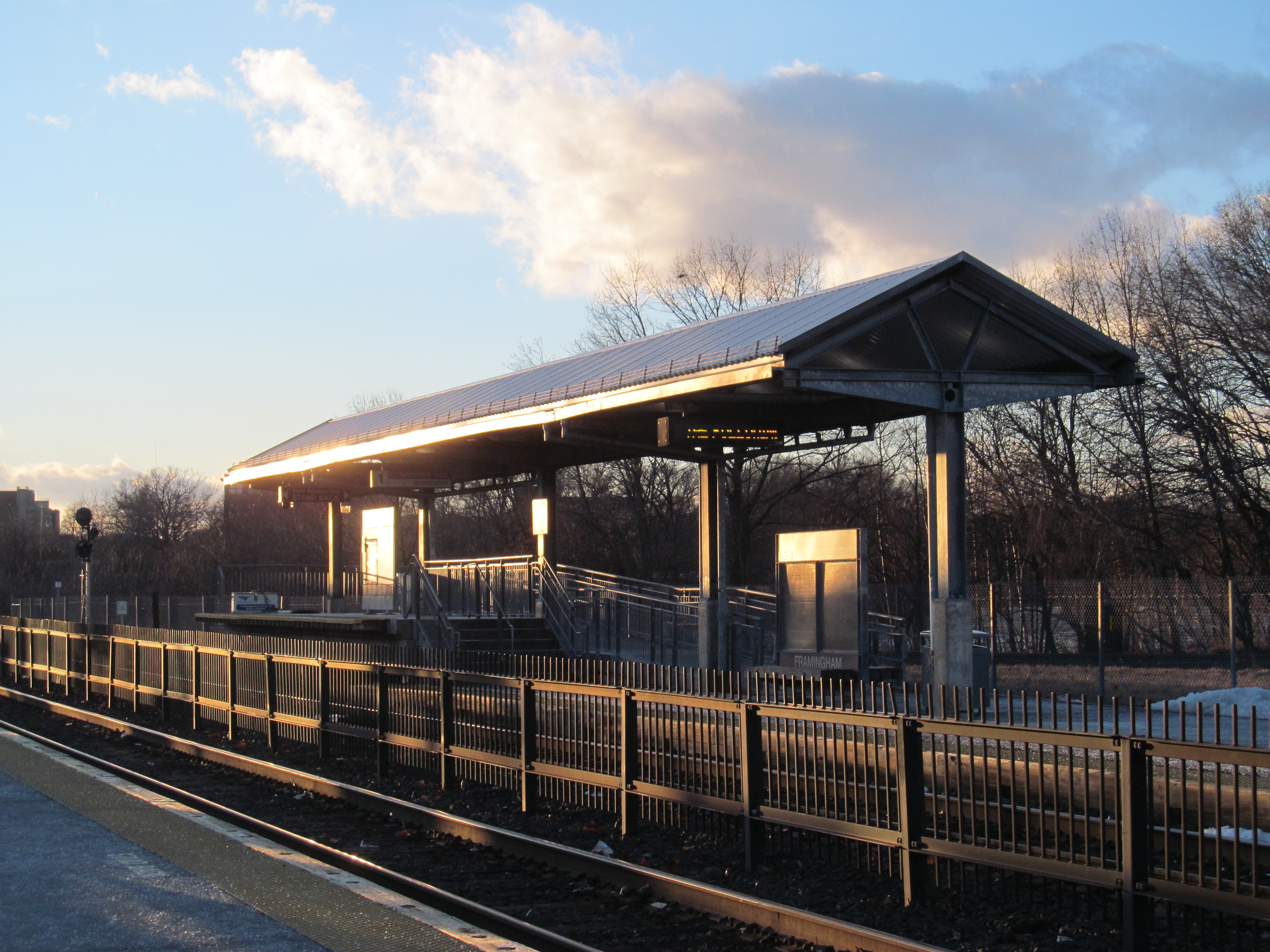
2001-built accessible mini-high platforms and fence to prevent pedestrians from crossing the tracks

The Americans with Disabilities Act of 1990 mandated that all new construction on transit stations include making the stations handicapped accessible. Because the 1885 depot is very close to the tracks, such upgrades at the old station location would have been difficult. Construction of accessible platforms and expanded parking was originally approved by the MBTA Board in May 1992. New platforms, with mini-high platforms on their west ends for level boarding, were built just west of the former station. A footbridge with two elevators was built to allow passengers to reach the outbound platform without crossing the tracks, which carry slow-moving CSX freight service as well as MBTA and Amtrak trains. The new platforms opened in early 2001, but the elevators were not yet open by that July.

Framingham currently sees 21 weekday MBTA round trips to Boston, with 8 to 9 round trips on weekends. On weekdays, Framingham is the only station west of Lansdowne station at which all trains stop. Most trains run to/from Worcester, but some terminate at Framingham instead. Average weekday ridership is 1,130 passengers, making Framingham the second-busiest station on the line outside Boston (after Worcester). Framingham also has Amtrak intercity service via the daily Lake Shore Limited, which runs to Chicago's Union Station via Albany–Rensselaer.

In October 2016, the MetroWest Regional Transit Authority (MWRTA) took over management of the station from the MBTA under a lease agreement. The agreement relieves the MBTA from the cost of maintaining the station, while allowing the MWRTA to use parking revenue to construct bus shelters and additional parking areas. An additional parking lot was opened inside the wye on the north side of the station in August 2017.

=== Other Framingham stations ===
Map of current and former railroad stations in and around Framingham

Besides the main depot at the South Framingham junction, six other stations have been located in Framingham. The Agricultural Branch included three of these stations. One, variously known as Montwait, Mt. Wayte, and Lakeview, was located just north of Mt. Wayte Avenue at the north end of Farm Pond. The station served the Montwait neighborhood as well as the Montwait Camp Ground, a worship camp used by Methodist, Chautaqua, and later Pentecostal groups from the 1870s to the 1910s. Montwait station was closed in 1928. The Framingham Centre station – at times known simply as Framingham – located at Maynard Street adjacent to Route 9. It was opened in 1849 when the branch to Framingham Center was completed. A new station was built in 1855 when the branch was realigned and extended. It also served the Framingham & Lowell after that line opened in 1871. The station was rebuilt in 1883. A freight house and coal shed were located nearby to the north. Fayville station was located just over the Southborough border in the Fayville village and also served the western reaches of Framingham. The station was placed at Central Street between Route 9 and Route 30 at or after the 1855 opening of the line. Passenger service on the branch ended in 1937; none of the buildings remain.

The Framingham & Lowell shared the South Framingham and Framingham Centre stations after its 1871 opening. An additional station, variously known as North Framingham and Nobscot, was located between Water Street and Edgell road, near the modern Nobscot Shopping Center. The station closed with the end of passenger service in the 1930s and was later destroyed. The former Nobscot post office and library building, which also served as a railroad ticket sales office, has been restored near its original site.

The Saxonville branch – the only line in Framingham not connected to South Framingham – opened from Natick to Saxonville in July 1846. Two stations on the branch line were in Framingham. Cochituate station was at Commonwealth Road (Route 30) on Framingham's eastern border with Natick. The terminus station at Saxonville was a "typical B&A granite station" located off Concord Street north of School Street (Route 126). The lightly-used line never saw more than three daily round trips; in 1936, passenger service was discontinued. A "bus" – in reality, a car driven by the Saxonville station agent – ran to Natick station until 1943. Neither station is extant; despite local rumors, a building in the Saxonville Historic District on Elm Street is unlikely to be the former Saxonville station.

== Station layout ==
The station consists of two high level side platforms serving the two tracks. A footbridge near the end of the platform allows for commuters to easily switch between the platforms while still staying within the station site. A medium-sized parking lot is adjacent to the station, offering a total of 170 parking spaces.

=== Grade crossings ===
Unlike most other mid-sized cities in Massachusetts, Framingham still has significant level crossings in the downtown area. The crossings at Beaver Street and Concord Street (Route 126) near the station are the first grade crossings on the Worcester Line heading westbound; there are only three others on the largely grade-separated line east of Worcester. The Concord Street crossing was one of the last in the state with a crossing guard; he was replaced by an automated system with grade crossing signals and road gates as warning devices in 1986.

The crossing is problematic because passing freight trains often result in delays both on Route 126, as well as Route 135 (Waverly Street) which crosses it just south of the tracks. The frequent blockage of the crossing by passing trains reduces capacity in the intersection by 21% during the morning rush and 16% in the afternoon, resulting in delays and traffic jams in the downtown area. Increased service levels planned by the MBTA would result in morning capacity reduction of 34% and afternoon reduction of 28%.

The first discussion of improving the intersection and grade crossing was a study in 1898, since which there have been about three dozen more. The most recent, a 2009 study of the downtown area, examined the possibility of depressing Route 126 under the grade crossing and intersection as well as several other alternatives including bypasses. The Route 126 depression was deemed to create barriers to walkability downtown, and the recommended alternative was to depress Route 135 under the intersection to prevent it from being affected by trains passing through the grade crossing. Funds have not yet become available for final design and construction.

South of the station platforms, the remaining rarely-used stub of the Milford Branch crosses Waverly Street (Route 135) at grade. East of Concord Street, the Framingham Secondary also crosses Waverly Street at grade. Both crossings are only used by slow-moving freight trains; they have flashing signals but no gates.

== See also ==
- National Register of Historic Places listings in Framingham, Massachusetts
