= Grafton station =

Railway station in Grafton, Massachusetts, US

Grafton
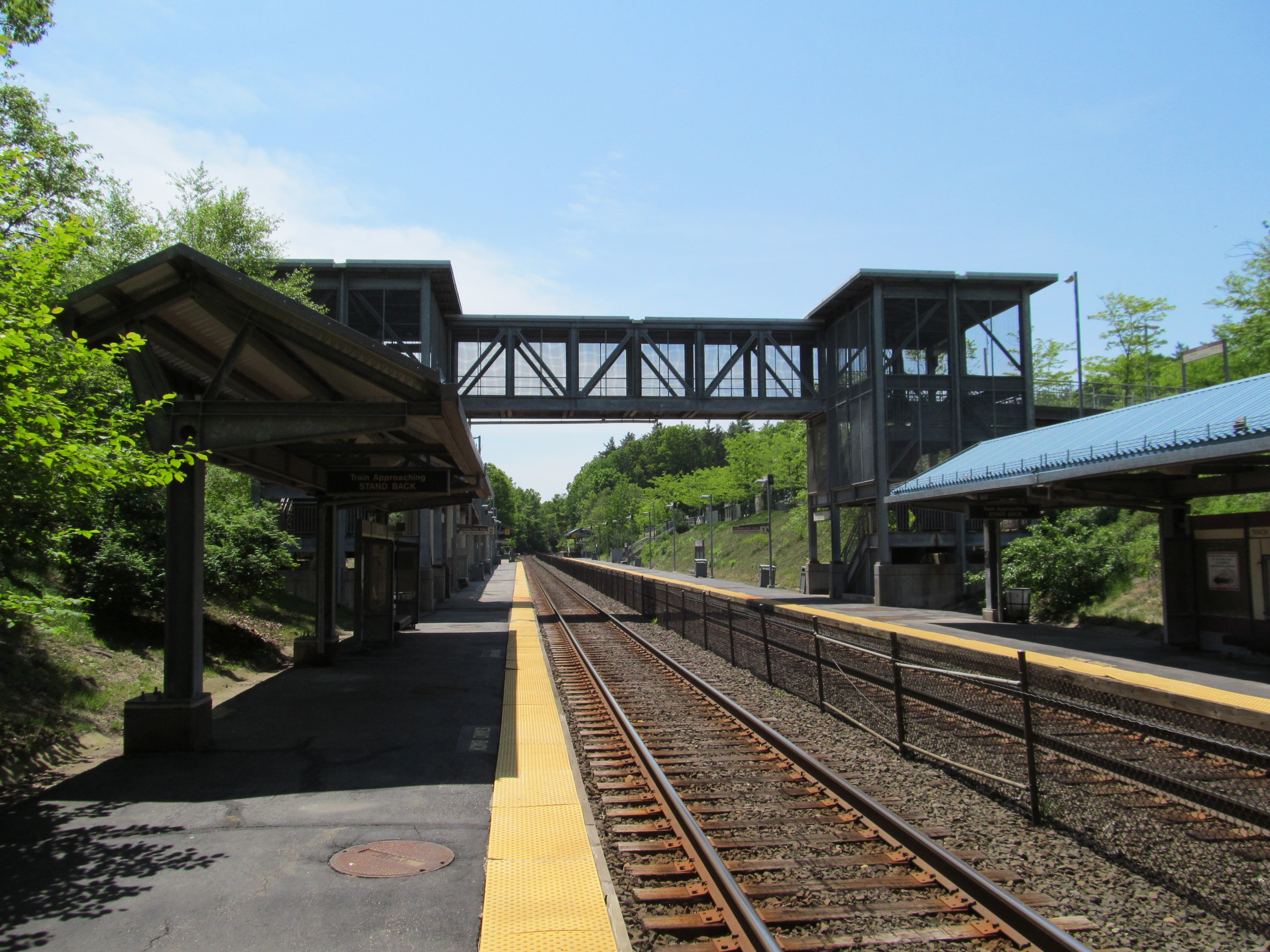
- Grafton station in May 2012

General information
- Location: 1 Pine Street; North Grafton, Grafton, Massachusetts
- Coordinates: 42.24678°N 71.68506°W
- Line: Worcester Main Line
- Platforms: 2 side platforms
- Tracks: 2
- Connections: WRTA: 85

Construction
- Parking: 386 spaces
- Cycle facilities: 8 spaces
- Accessible: Yes

Other information
- Fare zone: 8

History
- Opened: February 23, 2000

Passengers
- 2024: 367 daily boardings

Services
Preceding station	MBTA	Following station
Worcester Terminus	Framingham/Worcester Line	Westborough toward South Station
Location

Grafton station is an MBTA Commuter Rail station in the North Grafton village of Grafton, Massachusetts, served by the Framingham/Worcester Line. The station is accessible, with mini-high platforms serving both of the line's two tracks.

A former station at North Grafton was open from the 1800s until 1960. The modern station, located near Tufts University's Cummings School of Veterinary Medicine 1.3 miles (2.1 km) east of the former station, opened in 2000.

== History ==
=== Former station ===
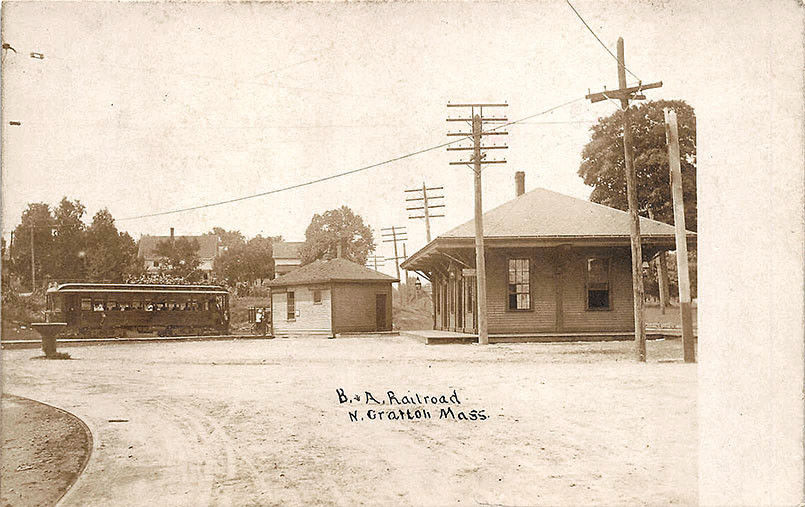
North Grafton station in the early 1900s

The Boston and Worcester Railroad, which later became part of the Boston and Albany Railroad (B&A) opened to Worcester on July 4, 1835. Grafton station was established near New England Village (later called North Grafton) along the road to Shrewsbury by 1838. Improvements to the station facilities were made around 1845. The Grafton Centre Railroad, a 3-mile (4.8 km) narrow-gauge feeder line, opened on August 20, 1874. Grafton station was renamed North Grafton to differentiate it from the Grafton Centre terminus. The branch line was converted to standard gauge in 1887, renamed the Grafton and Upton Railroad (G&U) in 1888, and extended to Milford in 1890.

The G&U was electrified in 1902; passenger service was provided by streetcars operated by the Milford and Uxbridge Street Railway. North Grafton was a transfer point between B&A trains, G&U streetcars, and Worcester Consolidated Street Railway streetcars on the Worcester–Westborough line and Grafton Centre branch. Under great financial strain, the Worcester Consolidated cut its unprofitable suburban lines between 1925 and 1931. Westborough service ended in 1927; Grafton service lasted until 1931. Streetcar service on the G&U ended on August 31, 1928, though freight service continued. The G&U has continued to use a yard at North Grafton, where the freight house (built between 1930 and 1957) remains in use by the railroad.

North Grafton station continued to be served by B&A commuter trains. The station was closed on April 24, 1960 when the B&A dropped almost all stops west of Framingham as part of service cuts. In August 1973, the 1964-formed Massachusetts Bay Transportation Authority (MBTA) began subsidizing service (operated by Penn Central since 1968) between Boston and Framingham. On October 27, 1975, the one remaining Worcester round trip was cut back to Framingham.

=== Modern station ===
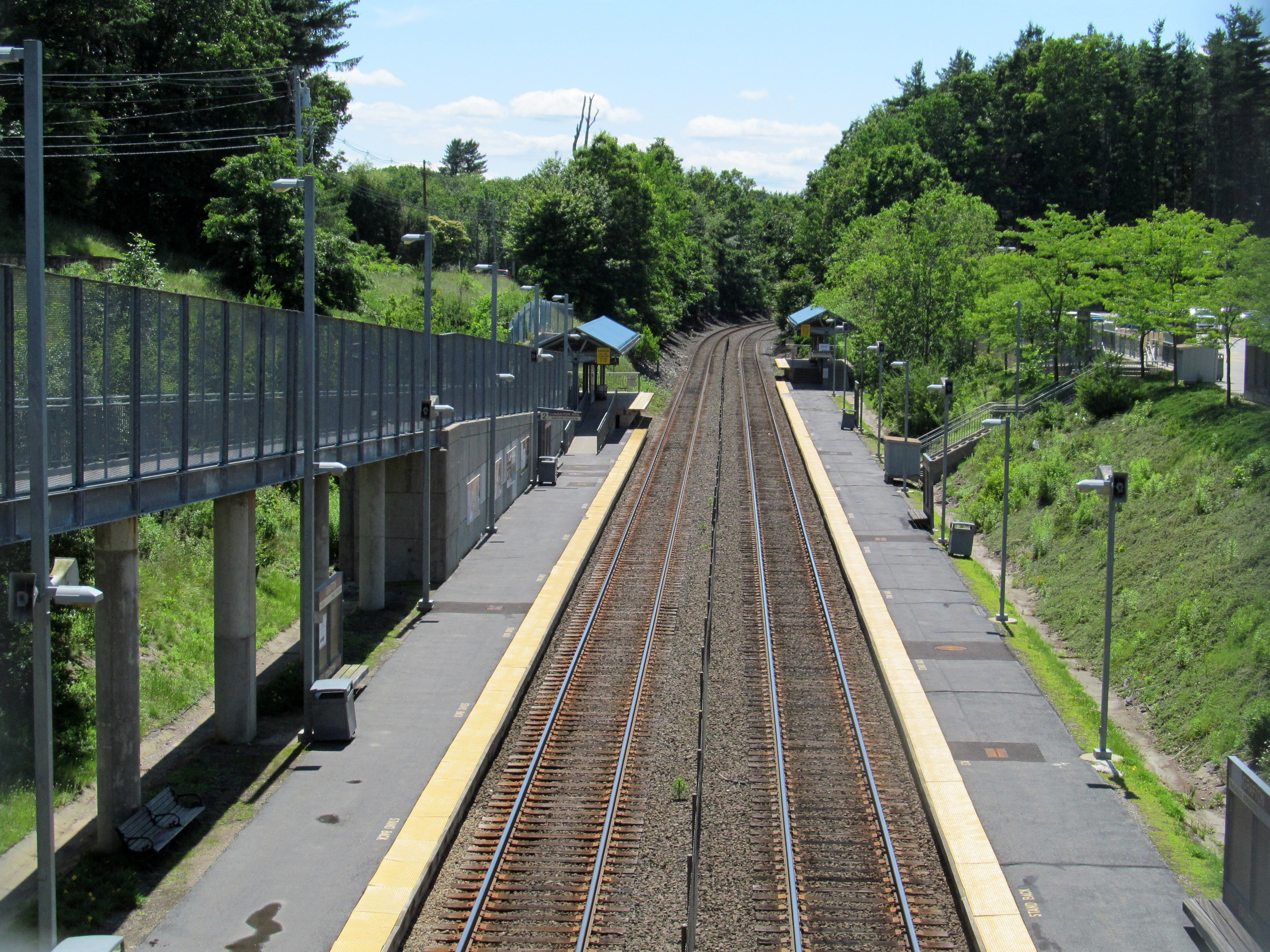
The station viewed from the footbridge in 2012

In 1994, service to Worcester was restored as mitigation for delays with reopening the Old Colony Lines. Service initially ran nonstop from Framingham to Worcester, but intermediate park and ride stops were added later as mitigation for delays in reopening the Greenbush Line. The final environmental impact statement for stations at Grafton and Millbury was released in 1996; the Millbury station was never built.

Grafton station opened on February 23, 2000 - the first of the four infill stations to open on the Framingham/Worcester Line. The modern station is 1.3 miles (2.1 km) east of the former North Grafton station site; it is located off Massachusetts Route 30 adjacent to the Cummings School of Veterinary Medicine and other redevelopment of the former Grafton State Hospital. The station was intended to support transit-oriented development of additional sections of the former hospital site.

The station has two low-level side platforms serving the two tracks of the Worcester Line, with mini-high platforms at the west ends to make the station accessible. The parking lot is on the north side of the station; a ramp leads from the lot directly to the outbound mini-high platform. A footbridge connects the lot to the inbound platform, with a ramp from the bridge to the mini-high section.
