= Union Station (Worcester, Massachusetts) =

Railway station in Worcester, Massachusetts, US

Worcester
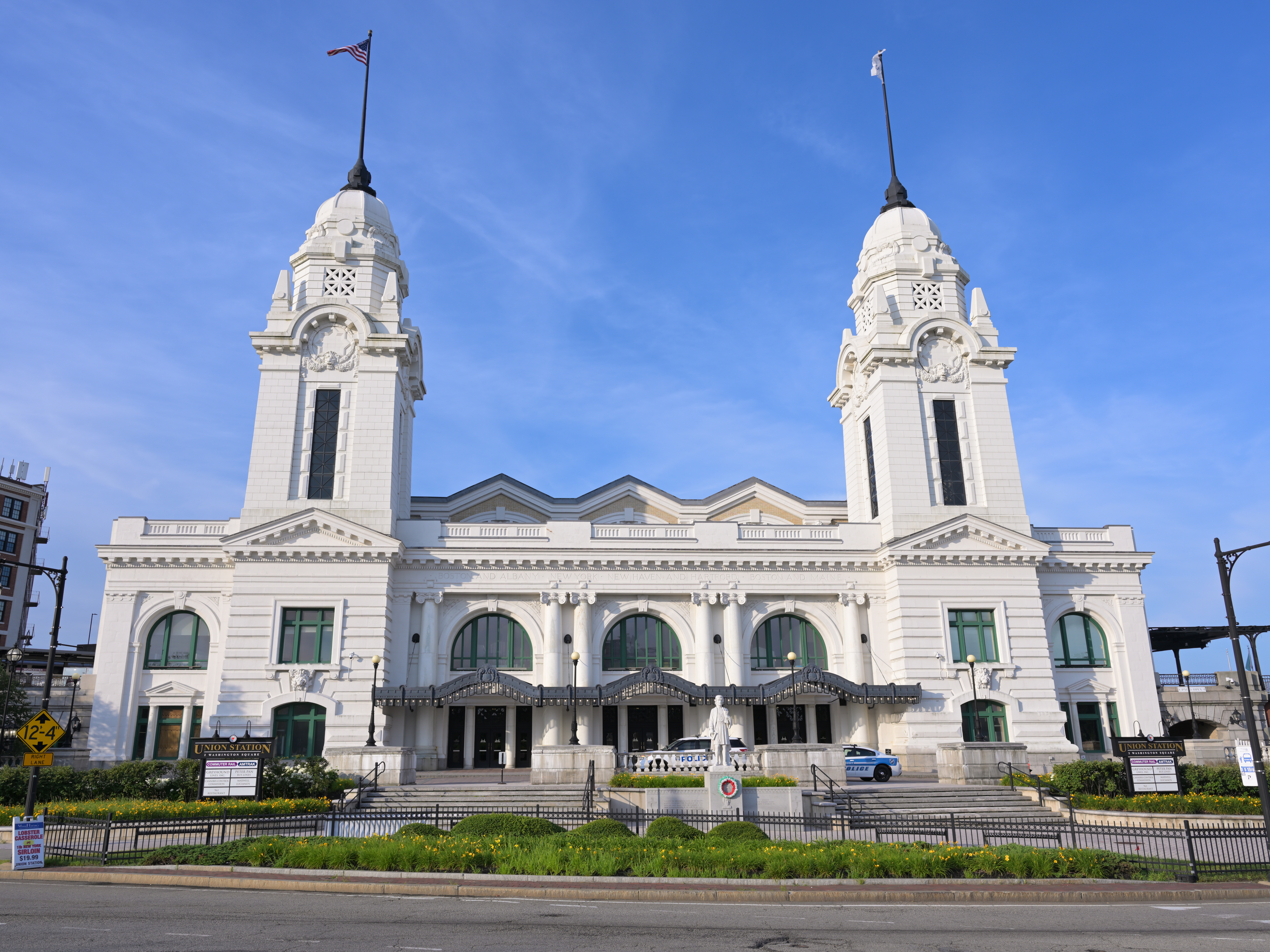
- Worcester Union Station in 2025

General information
- Location: 2 Washington Square; Worcester, Massachusetts
- Coordinates: 42°15′40″N 71°47′42″W
- Owner: Worcester Redevelopment Authority
- Lines: CSX Boston Subdivision / MBTA Worcester Main Line; CSX Worcester Branch / P&W Gardner Branch; P&W mainline P&W Norwich Branch
- Platforms: 1 island platform (Worcester Main Line); 2 unused island platforms (Worcester Branch)
- Tracks: 4 (Worcester Main Line); 2 (Worcester Branch)
- Connections: WRTA: 1, 2, 3, 4, 5, 6, 7, 11, 12, 14, 15, 16, 19, 23, 24, 26, 27, 29, 30, 31, 33, 42, 825; PVTA: B79; MART: Worcester Commuter; Greyhound, Peter Pan; Amtrak Thruway

Construction
- Parking: 624 spaces
- Cycle facilities: Yes
- Accessible: Yes

Other information
- Station code: Amtrak: WOR
- Fare zone: 8 (MBTA)

History
- Opened: 1835
- Rebuilt: 1875, 1909–1911, 1994–2000, 2021–2025

Passengers
- FY 2025: 5,170 annual boardings and alightings (Amtrak)
- 2024: 1,139 daily boardings (MBTA)

Services
Preceding station	Amtrak	Following station
Springfield toward Chicago	Lake Shore Limited	Framingham toward Boston South
Preceding station	MBTA	Following station
Terminus	Framingham/Worcester Line	Grafton toward South Station
Former services
Preceding station	New York Central Railroad	Following station
Jamesville toward Albany	Boston and Albany Railroad Main Line	North Grafton toward Boston
Preceding station	New York, New Haven and Hartford Railroad	Following station
South Worcester toward Providence	Providence and Worcester Railroad	Terminus
South Worcester toward New London	Norwich Branch	Terminus
Terminus	Worcester–Fitchburg	Lincoln Square toward Fitchburg
Preceding station	Boston and Maine Railroad	Following station
Terminus	Boston – Winchendon	Lincoln Square toward Winchendon
Terminus	Worcester – Nashua	Lincoln Square toward Nashua
Terminus	Worcester – Lowell	Lincoln Square toward Lowell
- Worcester Union Station
- U.S. National Register of Historic Places
- U.S. Historic district – Contributing property
- Built by: Woodbury and Leighton Company, Boston
- Architect: Watson & Huckel
- Architectural style: Beaux Arts
- Part of: Blackstone Canal Historic District (ID71000030)
- NRHP reference No.: 80000617

Significant dates
- Added to NRHP: 1980
- Designated CP: August 15, 1995
Location

Union Station is a railway station located at Washington Square in downtown Worcester, Massachusetts. It is the western terminus of the MBTA Commuter Rail Framingham/Worcester Line and a stop for the Amtrak Lake Shore Limited service. A bus terminal adjacent to the station is the hub for Worcester Regional Transit Authority (WRTA) local bus service; it is also used by MART, Peter Pan, and Greyhound intercity buses. PVTA also provides bus service from the station parking garage.

== History ==
=== Early stations ===
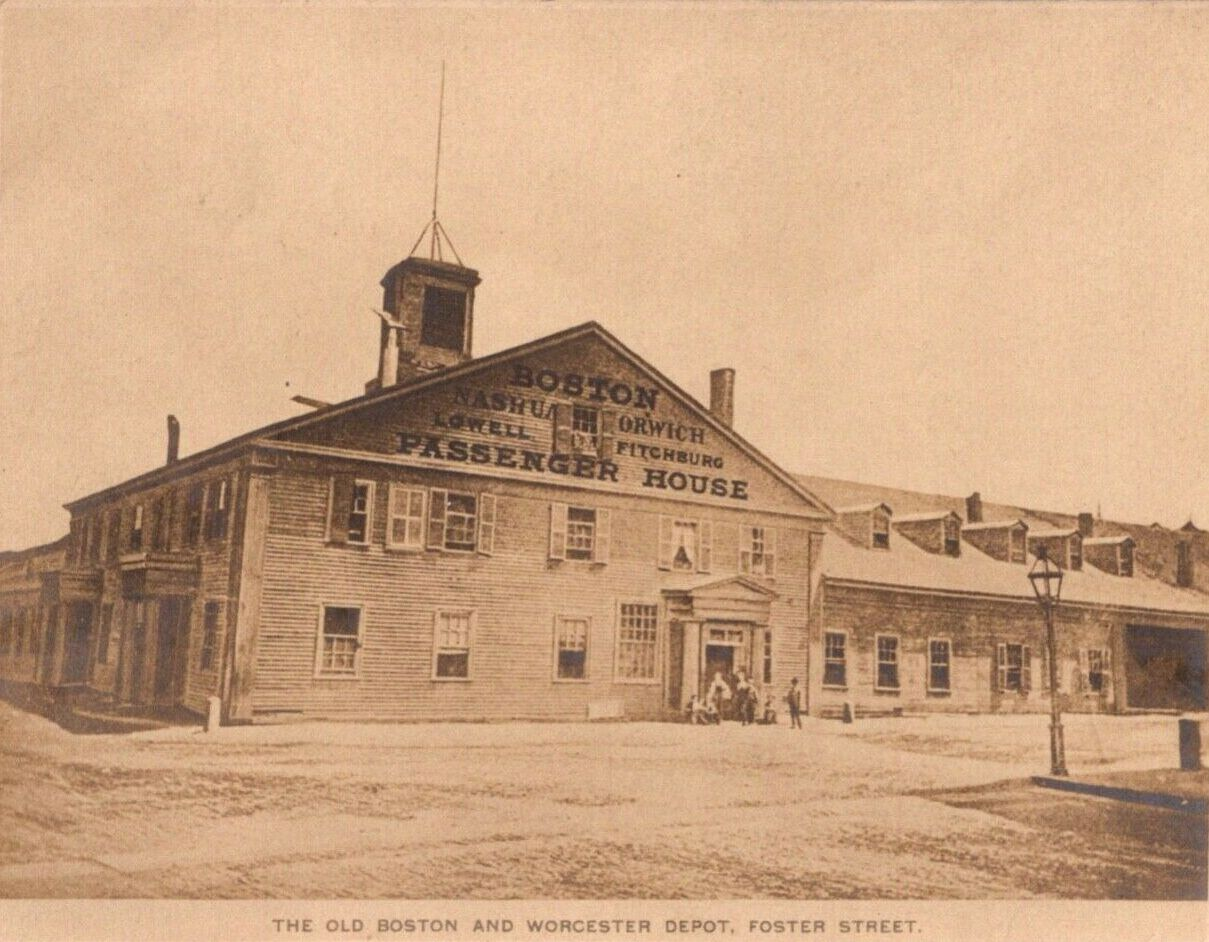
Postcard view of Foster Street station

Worcester became a rail hub in the mid-19th century, with seven railroads serving the city:

- The Boston and Worcester Railroad (B&W) opened between Boston and Worcester on July 4, 1835.
- The Western Railroad opened between Worcester and Springfield in October 1839, and to Albany, New York, in 1841.
- The Norwich and Worcester Railroad (N&W) opened between Norwich, Connecticut, and Worcester in March 1840.
- The Providence and Worcester Railroad (P&W) opened between Providence, Rhode Island, and Worcester in October 1847.
- The Worcester and Nashua Railroad (W&N) opened between Worcester and Groton Junction in July 1848, and to Nashua, New Hampshire, that December.
- The Fitchburg and Worcester Railroad (F&W) opened between Sterling Junction and Fitchburg in February 1850, using the W&N to access Worcester.
- The Boston, Barre and Gardner Railroad opened between Worcester and Gardner in September 1871, and to Winchendon in January 1874.

All except the Western and the P&W used Foster Street station, located just north of Worcester Common.

=== The first Union Station ===
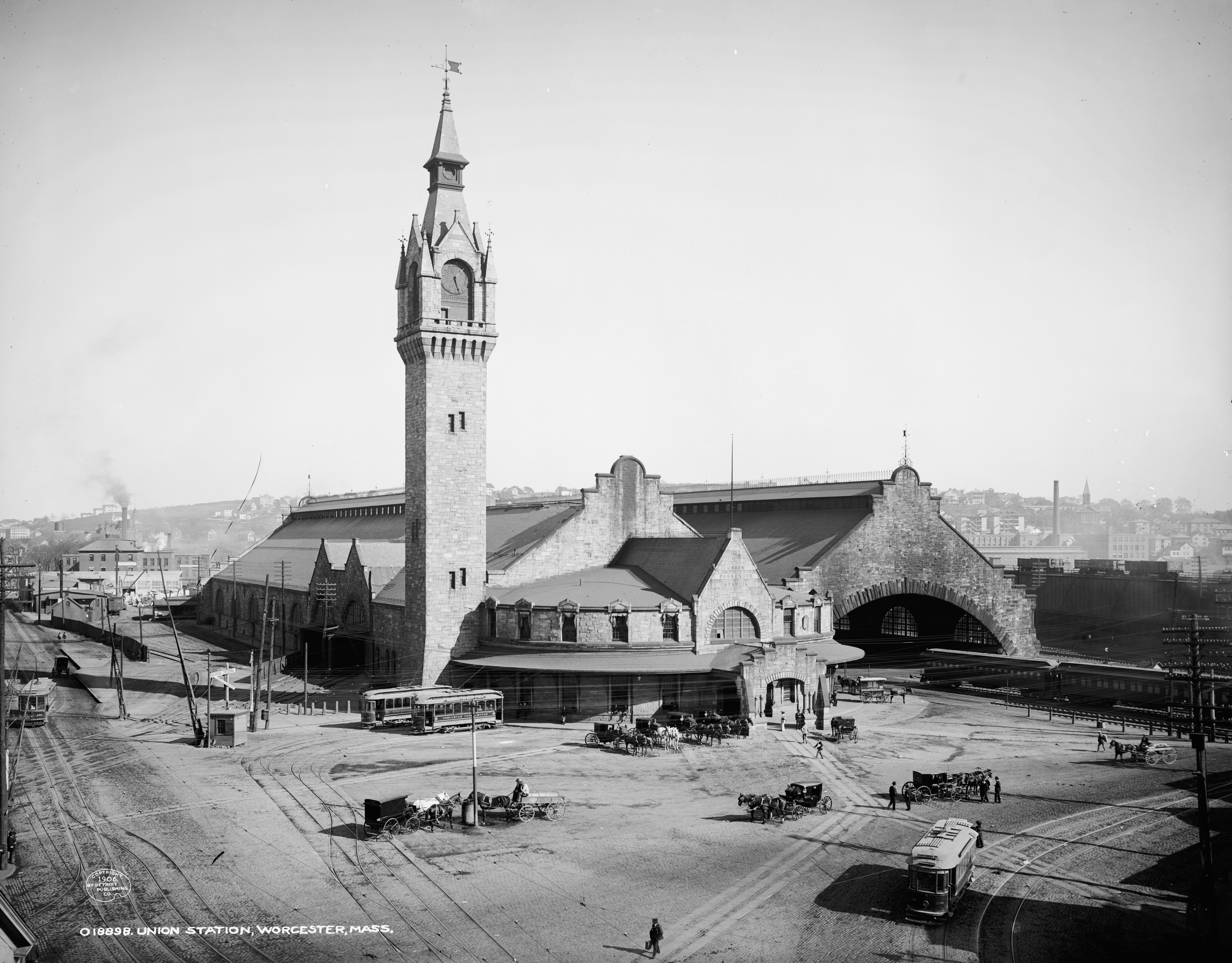
The 1875-built Union Station in 1906

A union station was constructed east of Washington Square in 1875. Designed by Ware & Van Brunt, it was modeled after a Roman basilica and featured a 212-foot (65 m)-tall clocktower. Most railroads in southern New England were consolidated into three systems in the later 19th century. Long rivals, the B&W and Western merged in 1867 to form the Boston and Albany Railroad, which became part of the New York Central Railroad system in 1900. The Boston and Maine Railroad (B&M) acquired W&N successor Worcester, Nashua and Rochester Railroad in 1886, and the Fitchburg Railroad system including the Boston, Barre and Gardner in 1900. The New York, New Haven and Hartford Railroad acquired the New York, Providence and Boston Railroad system including the P&W in 1892, the Old Colony Railroad system including the F&W in 1893, and the New York and New England Railroad system including the N&W in 1898.

=== The second Union Station ===
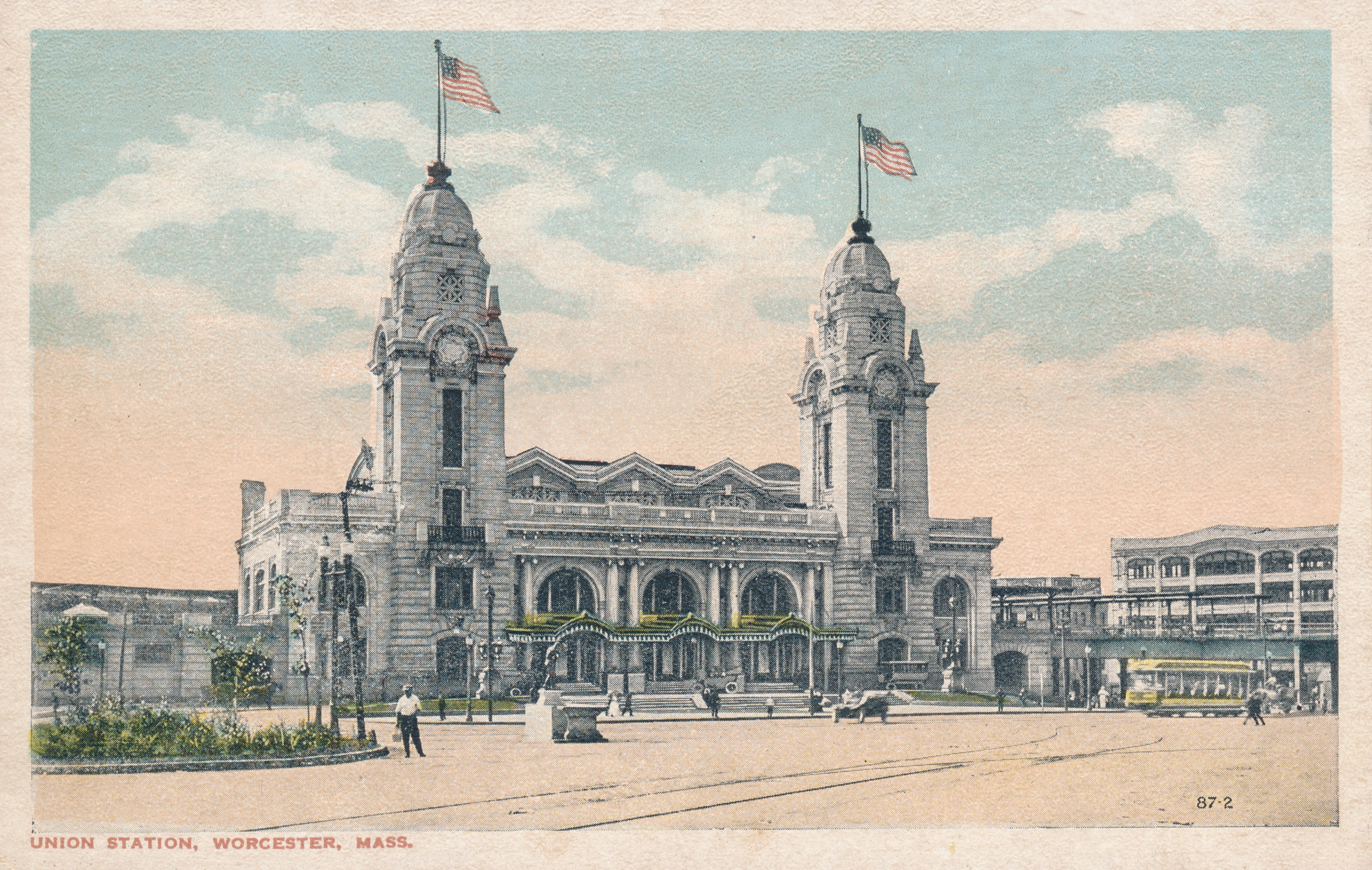
Union Station, circa 1920

Construction of a new Union Station on the southwest side of Washington Square began in 1909 as part of a grade separation project. The new station opened on June 4, 1911. It was designed by Watson & Huckel in a French Renaissance Revival style. Two 175-foot (53 m)-tall towers of white marble flanked the main entrance. The main waiting room featured an elliptical arched roof with stained glass. The towers were removed in 1926 due to structural issues.

Although primarily served by local trains, Worcester was also a stop for intercity services. On the B&A, these included the New England States and the Boston section of the Wolverine. Joint New Haven–B&M service between New York City and Maine (Bar Harbor Express, Down Easter, East Wind, and State of Maine Express) passed between the two railroads at Worcester.

Passenger service slowly declined during the 20th century. Local service to New London, Connecticut, on the N&W ended in 1928, though it resumed in 1952. Local service to Winchendon and Ayer ended in 1953, to Providence around 1957, and to Albany in 1960. New York–Maine intercity service also ended in 1960, leaving Worcester served by only a handful of Albany–Boston intercity trains and Worcester–Boston local trains on the B&A, plus a daily New London round trip. The New Haven and the New York Central merged into Penn Central in 1968-69.

Amtrak took over intercity service on May 1, 1971. The B&A intercity service (an unnamed successor to the New England States) and the New London trip were dropped, though the New Haven–Boston Bay State began operating through Worcester weeks later. Amtrak and Penn Central abandoned the main station building, using a small side building as a ticket office. The last commercial tenant left Union Station in 1972, and the structure fell into disrepair.

The Bay State was discontinued in May 1975. Commuter rail service between Worcester and Framingham (with no intermediate stops after 1960) was not subsidized by the MBTA; with just ten riders per day riding from Worcester, service was cut back to Framingham on October 27, 1975. Amtrak began operating a Boston-Albany section of the Lake Shore Limited four days later. Amtrak constructed a small station building on the east side of Interstate 290 in 1975 or 1976. Boston-New Haven (Inland Route) service was restored under the Bay State name in 1984, and ran in various forms until the early 2000s.

=== Restoration ===
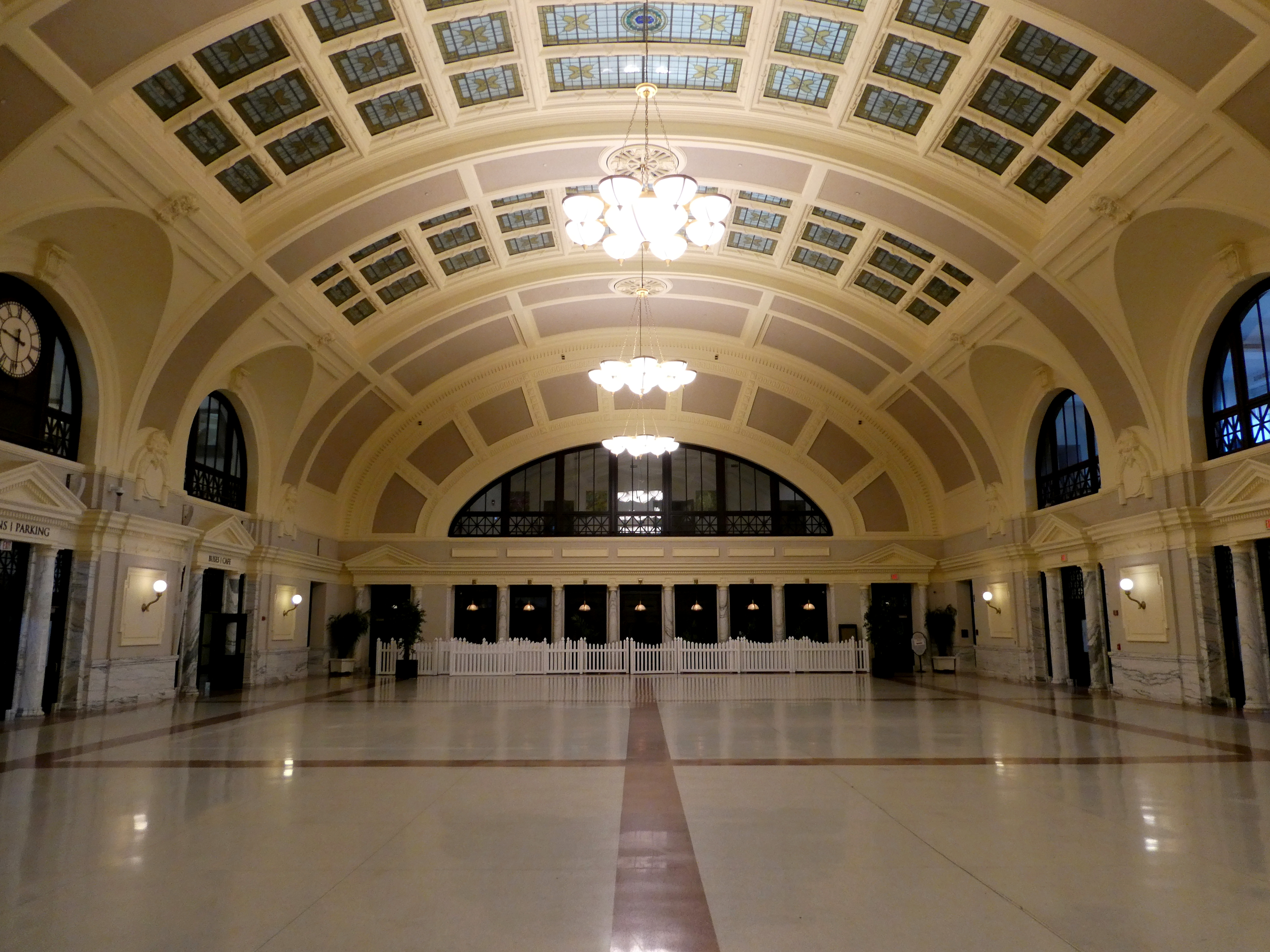
The restored Grand Hall in 2022

The abandoned Union Station was added to the National Register of Historic Places in 1980. Some peak-hour MBTA Commuter Rail Framingham/Worcester Line service was extended to Worcester on September 26, 1994. Off-peak service was gradually added; weekend service began on December 14, 1996. Union Station was acquired by the Worcester Redevelopment Authority in 1994 and completely renovated at a cost of $32 million. The station was restored and renovated by Finegold Alexander & Associates. The Grand Hall (the original waiting room), had its elliptical stained-glass ceilings, interior marble columns, and mahogany wood trim restored. Fiberglass towers were constructed to replace those removed in 1926. Amtrak and MBTA service began using Union Station on June 20, 2000.

An intercity and local bus terminal on the west side of the station, with five bus ports, was added at a cost of $5.2 million and opened in August 2006. In April 2012, the Worcester Regional Transit Authority broke ground on a new regional transit hub adjacent to Union Station. The cost was $14 million, with $10 million coming from the Federal Government and the rest coming from the state. The new hub opened in May 2013.

Luciano's Cotton Club, a 1920s gangster-themed restaurant, is located in the Grand Hall. The Cannabis Control Commission established their state headquarters in Union Station in 2019. Amtrak Thruway bus service between Worcester and New Bedford, Massachusetts, connecting with Amtrak trains at Providence, was added in 2023. Worcester Union Station is a proposed intermediate station for East-West Rail, which would provide intercity passenger service between Boston and Pittsfield.

=== Second platform ===
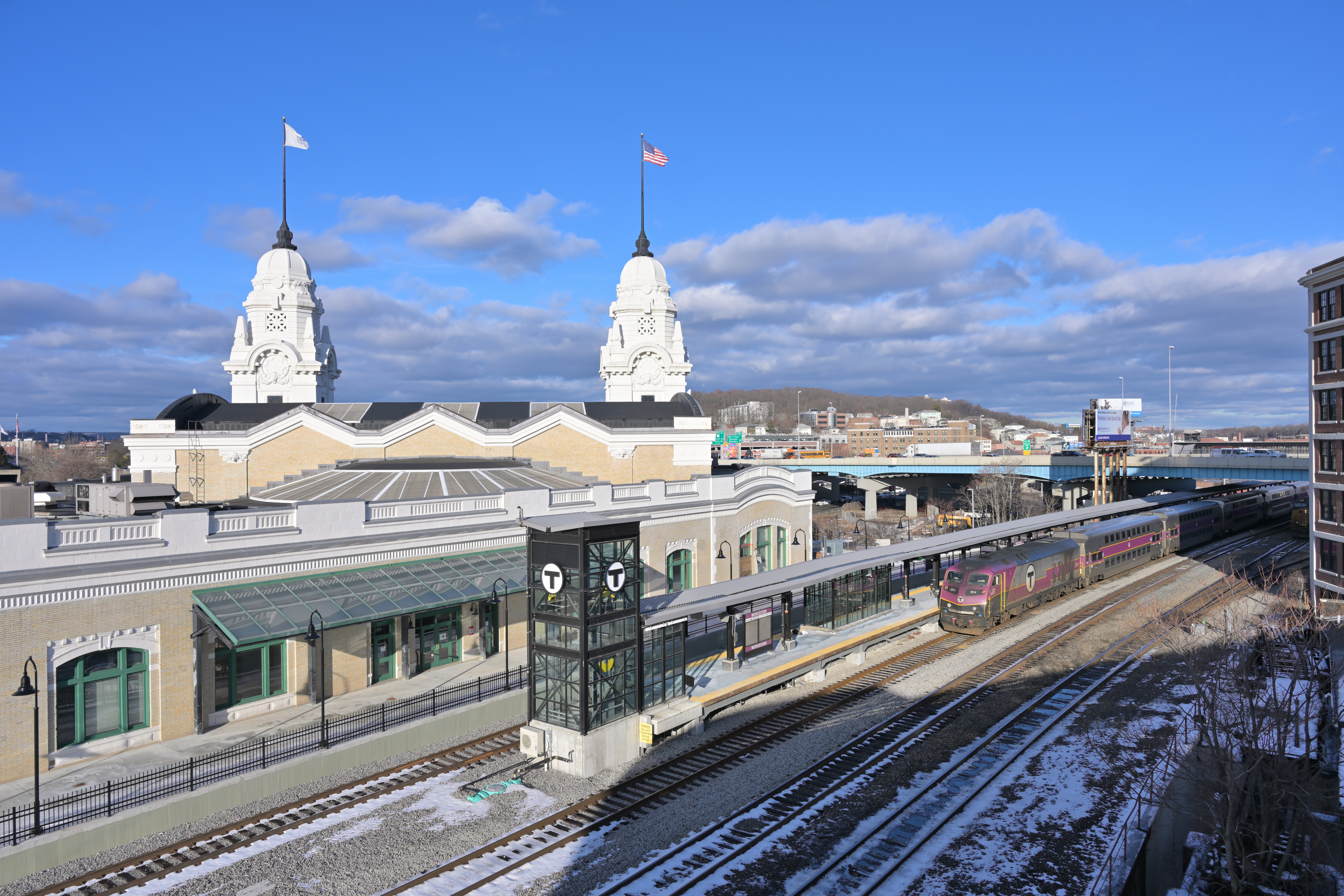
The completed new platform in January 2026

From 2000 to 2024, Union Station had a single high-level side platform several cars long. It was the only station on the line aside from the three limited-service Newton stations that could only be served by one train at a time – all other stations have two side platforms or an island platform. This limited the number of daily trains that could serve Worcester, and caused frequent cascading delays. After years of discussion about adding a second platform and extending the side platform to full length, the MBTA approved a two-year, $4 million design contract in October 2018.

Design reached 30% in August 2019. The new 820-foot (250 m)-long island platform has an accessible footbridge at its east end, and stairs and an elevator into a converted storage room to provide direct access from the station building at its west end. A crossover east of the station was also built. The full length of the new platform has a canopy. In 2019, construction was estimated to cost between $40 and $48 million. Plans at that time called for a temporary platform east of the I-290 overpass to be used while the west half of the new platform was constructed; the west half would then be used while the east half was built.

In October 2020, $29.3 million in federal funding for the project was announced. A $44.4 million construction contract was approved on October 27, 2021. Notice to proceed was given on November 29, 2021, with completion then expected in December 2023. The temporary platform was constructed over the weekend of March 12–13, 2022, and entered service on March 14. Contrary to previous plans, the entire new platform was built at the same time. Construction was 40% complete by December 2022 and 70% complete by November 2023. The new island platform opened on July 1, 2024, replacing the side platform. Demolition of the former side platform and other infrastructure work continued until September 2025. Total project cost was $74 million.
