= List of Connecticut railroads =

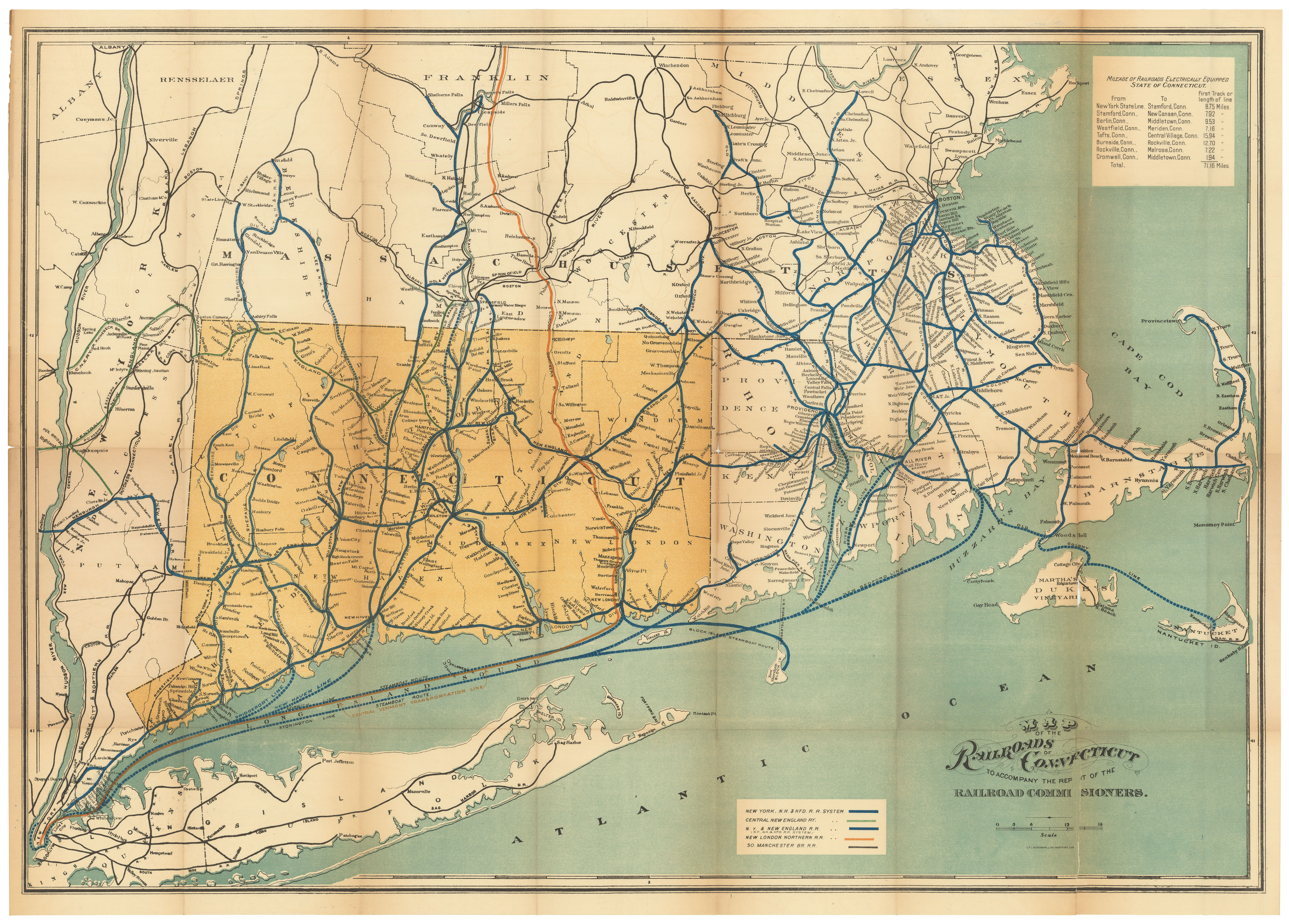
A map of Connecticut's railroads, circa 1912, showing approximately their maximum extent

This is a list of railroad companies which currently or formerly operated at least partially in the U.S. state of Connecticut.

== Active railroads ==
=== Freight carriers ===
Freight carriers
Name	Mark	Image	Founded	Predecessor(s)	Description	Owner	Reference
Branford Steam Railroad	BRFD	Branford Steam Railroad yard, December 2015	1903	N/A	Hauls stone from a Tilcon quarry in North Branford.	Tilcon Connecticut	
Central New England Railroad	CNZR	CNZR 3760 southbound in Bloomfield	1995	Conrail; Guilford Rail System	Operates two branch lines in and around Hartford.	Independent	
Connecticut Southern Railroad	CSO	CSOR freight train at Springfield Union Station, August 2018	1996	Conrail	Operates along Amtrak's New Haven–Springfield Line via trackage rights, along with several branches. Hauls freight between Cedar Hill Yard and West Springfield, Massachusetts, for CSX.	Genesee & Wyoming	
CSX Transportation	CSXT	B-724 northbound at MP QBU28	1980	Conrail	Assumed Conrail's Connecticut operations in 1999, chiefly on the New Haven Line and at Cedar Hill Yard.	CSX Corporation	
Housatonic Railroad	HRRC	Housatonic 3604 and 3601	1983	Conrail; Guilford Rail System	Operates a north-south line in western Connecticut, along with several branches.	Independent	
Naugatuck Railroad	NAUG	ReynoldsBridge ThomastonCT sm	1996	Guilford Rail System	Primarily a heritage railroad, but also provides freight service between Waterbury and Torrington.	Railroad Museum of New England	
New England Central Railroad	NECR	NECR 3850 at White River Junction.agr	1995	Central Vermont Railway	Operates a main line between New London and the Massachusetts state line, via Willimantic.	Genesee & Wyoming	
Pan Am Southern	PAS	Pan Am Engine 350	2009	Pan Am Railways	Joint venture between NS and PAR, operates all former PAR trackage in the state.	Norfolk Southern Railway (50%); Pan Am Railways (50%)	
Providence and Worcester Railroad	PW	P&W 4006 Baltic CT	1847 (original company)	Penn Central Transportation Company	Separated from Penn Central Transportation Company in 1973, operates across central and western Connecticut.	Genesee & Wyoming	

=== Passenger carriers ===
Name	Mark	Image	Founded	Predecessor(s)	Description	Owner	References
Amtrak	AMTK	AmtrakRegionalSpringfieldShuttleatHartford	1971	Penn Central Transportation Company	National intercity passenger railroad of the United States. Operates on the Northeast Corridor, owns and operates the New Haven–Springfield Line.	Federal government of the United States	
CT Rail	CNDX	Hartford Line Train	1990	N/A	Brand for commuter rail services operated by the State of Connecticut. Includes the Hartford Line, run under contract by TransitAmerica Services and Alternate Concepts, and Shore Line East, run under contract by Amtrak.	Connecticut Department of Transportation	
Metro-North Railroad	MNCW	Metro-North diesel train at Stamford station, May 2013	1983	Conrail	Operates commuter service along the New Haven Line, New Canaan Branch, Danbury Branch, and Waterbury Branch, under contract with the state of Connecticut.	Metropolitan Transportation Authority	

=== Heritage railroads ===
Name	Mark	Image	Founded	Predecessor(s)	Description	Owner	References
Connecticut Trolley Museum		Former New Orleans Car 836 at the Connecticut Trolley Museum, May 2004	1940	Hartford and Springfield Street Railway Company			
Danbury Railway Museum	DRMX	DRM locomotives	1994	Metro-North Railroad		Independent	
Naugatuck Railroad	NAUG		1996			Railroad Museum of New England	
Shore Line Trolley Museum		Johnstown 357 crossing trestle at sunset, August 2016	1945	Connecticut Company		Branford Electric Railway Association	
Valley Railroad	VALE	Valley Railroad 3025 at Essex November 11, 2019	1971	Penn Central Transportation Company			

== Defunct railroads ==
Name	Mark	System (Note: This is one or more of the Class I railroads that the railroad became part of, if any.)	From (Note: This date refers to the year in which the railroad company was chartered or formed, and may be earlier than when the company ran its first train, if ever.)	To (Note: This date refers to when the railroad company formally ceased to exist. Many railroads were leased by other companies, de facto becoming part of them, but remained separate on paper for some time. If this date differs from when the railroad last operated independently, this will be noted in the description section.)	Successor	Description	References
Boston, Hartford and Erie Railroad		NH	1863	1874	New York and New England Railroad		
Boston and Maine Corporation	BM		1983			Still exists as a lessor of Pan Am Railways operating subsidiary Springfield Terminal Railway	
Boston and New York Air-Line Railroad		NH	1875	1907	New York, New Haven and Hartford Railroad		
Boston and New York Central Railroad		NH	1853	1858	Midland Railroad		
Boston, Norwich and New London Railroad		NH	1832	1836	Norwich and Worcester Railroad		
Branch Company		NH	1845	1850	Hartford and New Haven Railroad	Built a short spur between the H&NH main line in Hartford, and the Connecticut River.	
Central New England Railway	CNE	NH	1899	1927	New York, New Haven and Hartford Railroad		
Central New England and Western Railroad	NH		1889	1892	Philadelphia, Reading and New England Railroad		
Central Vermont Railroad		CN	1873	1899	Central Vermont Railway		
Central Vermont Railway	CV	CN	1899	1995	New England Central Railroad		
Colchester Railroad		NH	1876	1907	New York, New Haven and Hartford Railroad		
Connecticut Central Railroad (Note: No relation to the identically named company which existed 1871-1887.)	CCCL		1987	1998	Providence and Worcester Railroad	Shortline railroad that operated former Conrail trackage in and around Middletown, Connecticut.	
Connecticut Central Railroad		NH	1871	1887	New York and New England Railroad		
Connecticut Valley Railroad		NH	1868	1880	Hartford and Connecticut Valley Railroad		
Connecticut Western Railroad		NH	1868	1881	Hartford and Connecticut Western Railroad		
Consolidated Rail Corporation	CR		1976	1999	CSX Transportation		
Danbury and Norwalk Railroad		NH	1850	1907	New York, New Haven and Hartford Railroad		
Danbury Terminal Railroad	DTRR		1993	1996	Housatonic Railroad		
East Granby and Suffield Railroad		NH	1901	1908	Central New England Railway		
East Thompson Railroad		NH	1853	1858	Boston and New York Central Railroad		
Fairfield County Railroad		NH	1835	1850	Danbury and Norwalk Railroad		
Farmington Valley Railroad		NH	1852	1862	New Haven and Northampton Railroad	Built an extension of the New Haven and Northampton Railroad from Granby to the Massachusetts state line, leased by the NH&N soon after completion.	
Hartford and Connecticut Valley Railroad		NH	1879	1892	New York, New Haven and Hartford Railroad		
Hartford and Connecticut Western Railroad		NH	1881	1947	New York, New Haven and Hartford Railroad		
Hartford and New Haven Railroad		NH	1833	1872	New York, New Haven and Hartford Railroad	The first railroad built in Connecticut; construction began in 1836. Opened from New Haven to Hartford in 1839, to Springfield, Massachusetts in 1844. Merged with the New York and New Haven Railroad in 1872.	
Hartford and Providence Railroad		NH	1847	1849	Hartford, Providence and Fishkill Railroad		
Hartford, Providence and Fishkill Railroad		NH	1849	1879	New York and New England Railroad		
Hartford and Springfield Railroad		NH	1835	1847	Hartford and New Haven Railroad	Formed in 1835 to build north from Hartford to the Massachusetts state line. Owned and operated by the Hartford and New Haven Railroad, merged into that company in 1847.	
Housatonic Railroad		NH	1836	1898	New York, New Haven and Hartford Railroad		
Manchester Railroad		NH	1833	1847	Hartford and Providence Railroad		
Manufacturers' Railroad (Note: Known as the Manufacturers' Street Railway 1893-1897.)		NH	1893	1907	New York, New Haven and Hartford Railroad		
Meriden and Cromwell Railroad		NH	1882	1888	Meriden, Waterbury and Connecticut River Railroad		
Meriden and Waterbury Railroad		NH	1887	1888	Meriden, Waterbury and Connecticut River Railroad		
Meriden, Waterbury and Connecticut River Railroad		NH	1888	1896	Middletown, Meriden and Waterbury Railroad		
Middletown Railroad		NH	1844	1850	Hartford and New Haven Railroad	Formed by citizens of Middletown to connect their city to the H&NH main line in Berlin. Built in 1848, purchased by the H&NH in 1850.	
Middletown Extension Railroad		NH	1857	1861	Hartford and New Haven Railroad	Formed to build an extension of the Middletown Railroad to the Connecticut River. Built in 1860, consolidated into the Hartford and New Haven Railroad the following year.	
Middletown, Meriden and Waterbury Railroad		NH	1897	1907	New York, New Haven and Hartford Railroad		
Midland Railroad		NH	1858	1862	Midland Land Damage Company		
Midland Land Damage Company		NH	1861	1863	Southern Midland Railroad		
Naugatuck Railroad		NH	1845	1906	New York, New Haven and Hartford Railroad		
New Britain and Middletown Railroad		NH	1852	1868	Hartford and New Haven Railroad	Formed by citizens in New Britain to construct a short branch to the H&NH in Berlin. Constructed in 1862, it was operated by the H&NH until that company absorbed it in 1868.	
New Canaan Railroad		NH	1866	1883	Stamford and New Canaan Railroad		
New England Railroad		NH	1895	1908	New York, New Haven and Hartford Railroad		
New Haven and Derby Railroad		NH	1864	1907	New York, New Haven and Hartford Railroad		
New Haven, Middletown and Willimantic Railroad		NH	1867	1875	Boston and New York Air-Line Railroad		
New Haven and New London Railroad		NH	1848	1865	Shore Line Railway		
New Haven, New London and Stonington Railroad		NH	1858	1864	New York, Providence and Boston Railroad		
New Haven and Northampton Railroad		NH	1846	1910	New York, New Haven and Hartford Railroad		
New London Northern Railroad		CN	1859	1951	Central Vermont Railway		
New London and Stonington Railroad		NH	1852	1864	New York, Providence and Boston Railroad		
New London, Willimantic and Palmer Railroad		CN	1849	1861	New London Northern Railroad		
New London, Willimantic and Springfield Railroad		CN	1847	1849	New London, Willimantic and Palmer Railroad		
New York and Boston Railroad		NH	1846	1865	Boston, Hartford and Erie Railroad		
New York and Hartford Railroad		NH	1845	1849	Hartford, Providence and Fishkill Railroad		
New York, Housatonic and Northern Railroad		NH	1864	1882	Housatonic Railroad		
New York and New England Railroad		NH	1873	1895	New England Railroad		
New York and New Haven Railroad		NH	1844	1872	New York, New Haven and Hartford Railroad		
New York, New Haven and Hartford Railroad	NH	NH	1872	1969	Penn Central Transportation Company		
New York, Providence and Boston Railroad		NH	1833	1893	New York, New Haven and Hartford Railroad		
New York and Stonington Railroad		NH	1832	1833	New York, Providence and Boston Railroad		
Norwich and Worcester Railroad		NH	1836	1976	Consolidated Rail Corporation		
Penn Central Transportation Company	PC		1969	1976	Consolidated Rail Corporation		
Philadelphia, Reading and New England Railroad		NH	1892	1899	Central New England Railway		
Rockville Railroad		NH	1863	1907	New York, New Haven and Hartford Railroad		
Rockville Branch Railroad		NH	1857	1863	New York, New Haven and Hartford Railroad		
Shepaug, Litchfield and Northern Railroad (Note: Known as the Shepaug Valley railroad 1866–1873, Shepaug Railroad 1873-1887.)		NH	1866	1898	New York, New Haven and Hartford Railroad		
Shore Line Railway		NH	1864	1897	New York, New Haven and Hartford Railroad		
South Manchester Railroad		NH	1866	1976	Consolidated Rail Corporation		
Southbridge and Blackstone Railroad		NH	1849	1853	Boston and New York Central Railroad		
Southern Midland Railroad		NH	1863	1863	Boston, Hartford and Erie Railroad		
Stamford and New Canaan Railroad		NH	1882	1890	New York, New Haven and Hartford Railroad		
Thompson and Willimantic Railroad		NH	1857	1863	Boston, Hartford and Erie Railroad		
Vermont Central Railroad		CN	1871	1873	Central Vermont Railroad		
Watertown and Waterbury Railroad		NH	1869	1893	Naugatuck Railroad	Chartered in 1869 to connect Watertown to the Naugatuck Railroad in Waterbury. Was leased by the Naugatuck Railroad upon opening in the fall of 1870, which absorbed it in 1893.	
Windsor Locks and Suffield Railroad		NH	1868	1871	Hartford and New Haven Railroad	Formed in 1868 to construct a branch between Suffield and Windsor Locks, where it met the H&NH. Built in 1870, it was absorbed by the H&NH in 1871.	

=== Street railroads ===
Entries in this list were interurbans, streetcars, or other electric railroads dedicated to passenger transport.

Name	Founded	Disestablished	Successor	Description	References
Branford Lighting and Water Company		1905	Consolidated Railway		
Bridgeport Horse Railway Company					
Bridgeport Railway Company					
Bridgeport Traction Company					
Bristol Traction Company					
Central Railway and Electric Company					
Cheshire Street Railway					
Connecticut Company					
Connecticut Railway and Lighting Company					
Consolidated Railway					
Danbury and Bethel Street Railway					
Fair Haven and Westville Railroad					
Farmington Street Railway					
Hartford and Springfield Street Railway					
Hartford, Manchester and Rockville Tramway Company					
Hartford Street Railway					
Hartford and West Hartford Horse Railroad					
Meriden Electric Railroad					
Meriden, Southington and Compounce Tramway Company					
Middletown Street Railroad					
Montville Street Railway					
New Haven Street Railway					
New London Street Railway					
Norwich Street Railway					
People's Tramway					
Shore Line Electric Railway					
Stamford Street Railroad					
Stafford Springs Street Railway					
Torrington and Winchester Street Railway					
Waterbury and Milldale Tramway	June 5, 1907	April 3, 1936	Replaced by bus line		
West Shore Railway					
Winchester Avenue Railroad					

Not completed

- New York and Boston Rapid Transit Company
- Ridgefield and New York Railroad

== Bibliography ==
- Karr, Ronald Dale (2017). The Rail Lines of Southern New England (2nd ed.). Pepperell, Massachusetts: Branch Line Press. ISBN 978-0-942147-12-4. OCLC 1038017689.
