= Housatonic Railroad (1836) =

Railroad in Connecticut and Massachusetts, US

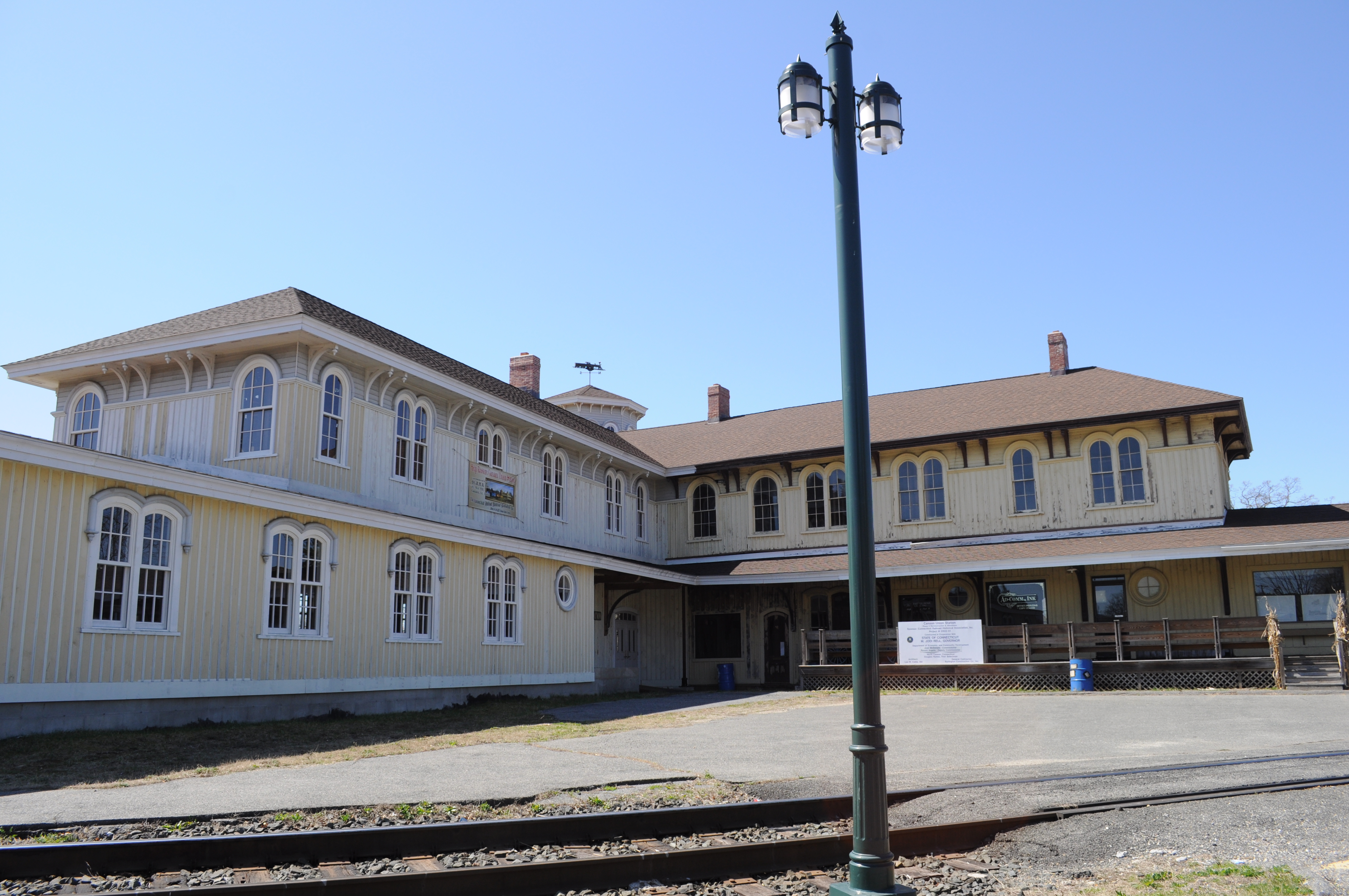
- Canaan Union Depot, a preserved Housatonic Railroad train station

Overview
- Operator: Housatonic Railroad (current company); Providence and Worcester Railroad (overhead trackage rights)
- Dates of operation: 1840–1892
- Successor: New York, New Haven and Hartford Railroad

Technical
- Track gauge: 4 ft 8 1/2 in (1,435 mm) standard gauge

The Housatonic Railroad was a railroad in the U.S. states of Connecticut and Massachusetts, chartered in 1836. Opened between Bridgeport, Connecticut, and New Milford, Connecticut, in 1840, it was completed to a connection with the Western Railroad in West Stockbridge, Massachusetts, in 1842. Branches were later built to Pittsfield, Massachusetts, Danbury, Connecticut, and Derby, Connecticut, the latter as part of the Housatonic Railroad's purchase of the New Haven and Derby Railroad in 1887.

The Housatonic Railroad was leased by the New York, New Haven and Hartford Railroad in 1892, which abandoned several portions from 1940 onwards. Control passed to Penn Central at the end of 1968, followed by Conrail in 1976; the latter abandoned much of the Housatonic Railroad main line and sold the northern portion to the Boston and Maine Railroad in 1982 (succeeded by Guilford Transportation Industries in 1984). A new Housatonic Railroad was formed in 1984 and revived the abandoned portion of the original Housatonic; in 1991 and 1992 it purchased the remainder from Guilford and Conrail respectively.

== History ==
=== Formation and construction ===
The Housatonic Railroad was conceived by a group of Bridgeport businessmen in early 1836. They were concerned about the planned Danbury and Norwalk Railroad, which was to link the Long Island Sound port of Norwalk to Danbury; an extension was also envisioned to the Western Railroad (then under construction) in West Stockbridge, Massachusetts. If completed, the Danbury and Norwalk Railroad would provide a route from Litchfield County to the Sound that bypassed Bridgeport. Protective of Bridgeport's position as a hub for Housatonic Valley trade, they decided to build a railroad of their own before the Danbury and Norwalk could be completed. This group met in March 1836 and agreed to seek a charter from the Connecticut General Assembly authorizing their railroad. Henry Alfred Bishop quickly took a leading role in organizing the company. 23 year old William Henry Noble (a future Union Army general) drafted two charters for the railroad, one for the businessmen, and one for the city of Bridgeport itself.

Both charters for the Housatonic Railroad (originally misspelled as the "Ousatonic Railroad") were granted by the Connecticut General Assembly in May 1836, authorizing a railroad between Bridgeport and the Massachusetts state line. Following the Housatonic Valley, the route was to pass through Brookfield and New Milford. The city of Bridgeport held a meeting on March 2, 1837, and $100,000 (equivalent to $2,400,000 in 2021) was subscribed towards the railroad's construction; this was later increased to $150,000. Construction of the railroad began in July 1837, but was negatively impacted by the Panic of 1837.

To extend the railroad, another charter was obtained from the Massachusetts General Court in 1837, authorizing a continuation of the railroad to West Stockbridge under the name Berkshire Railroad. The 4-mile (6.4 km) long West Stockbridge Railroad continued from West Stockbridge to the New York state line, meeting the Western Railroad.

=== Independent operations ===
Service between Bridgeport and New Milford began in February 1840. The remainder of the Housatonic Railroad opened for business from New Milford to the New York state line in December 1842 (construction on the Berkshire Railroad had begun in February 1841, and the West Stockbridge Railroad opened in 1838). The Berkshire and West Stockbridge railroads were both leased within the following year. In 1847, the Housatonic received a new charter for the Stockbridge and Pittsfield Railroad, a northward extension to Pittsfield. Here, a second connection would be made with the Western Railroad. Construction started in 1848 and the new line opened in 1850, with the Housatonic leasing the Stockbridge and Pittsfield during construction. The extension became part of the Housatonic's main line, while the original alignment to the New York border provided an alternative route for freight trains.

Finances were difficult at first for the Housatonic, and deficits fell on the city of Bridgeport. Extensive New York City-bound milk traffic from local dairy farms helped make profitable operations possible by the mid to late 1860s; the railroad averaged 100,000 US quarts (95,000 L) of milk shipped daily.

A branch to Danbury was built by the 1864-chartered New York, Housatonic and Northern Railroad in September 1868 and operated by the Housatonic Railroad, which leased the New York, Housatonic and Northern in 1872 and absorbed it entirely a decade later. A second branch was built as part of the Housatonic Railroad's 1887 acquisition of the New Haven and Derby Railroad from the city of New Haven, which was completed on the condition that a connection be built between Botsford and Derby. The Botsford Extension was completed in November of the following year.

=== Lease by the New Haven ===
Stockbridge station

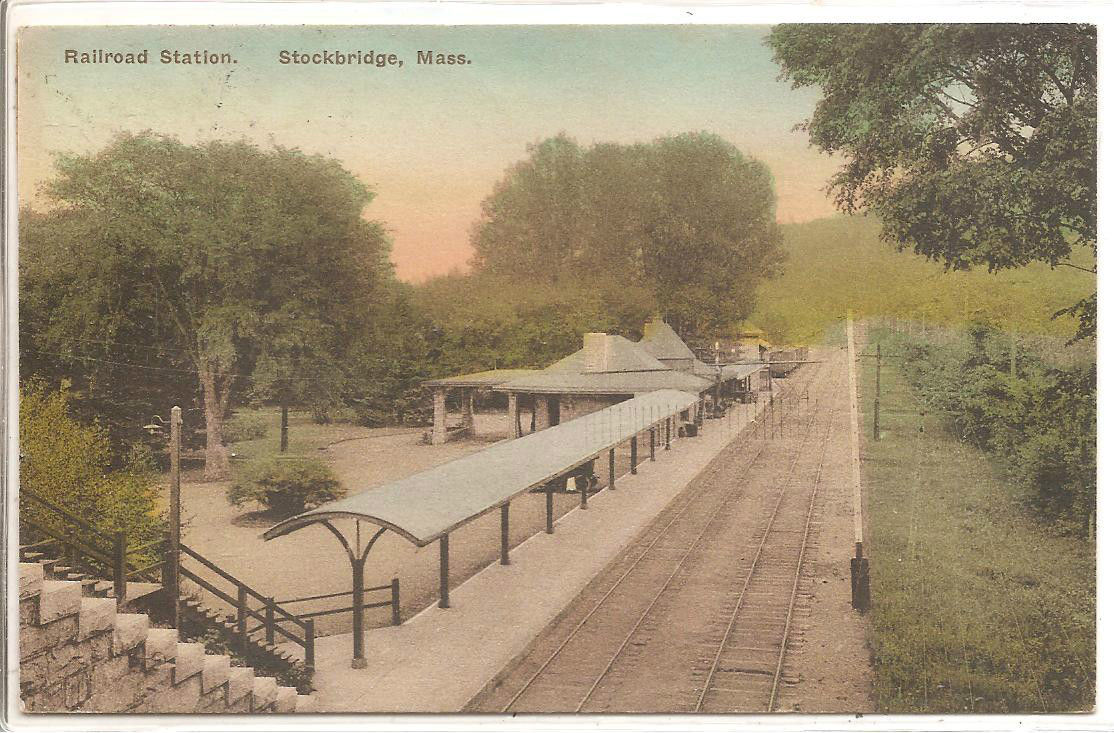
Early 1900s

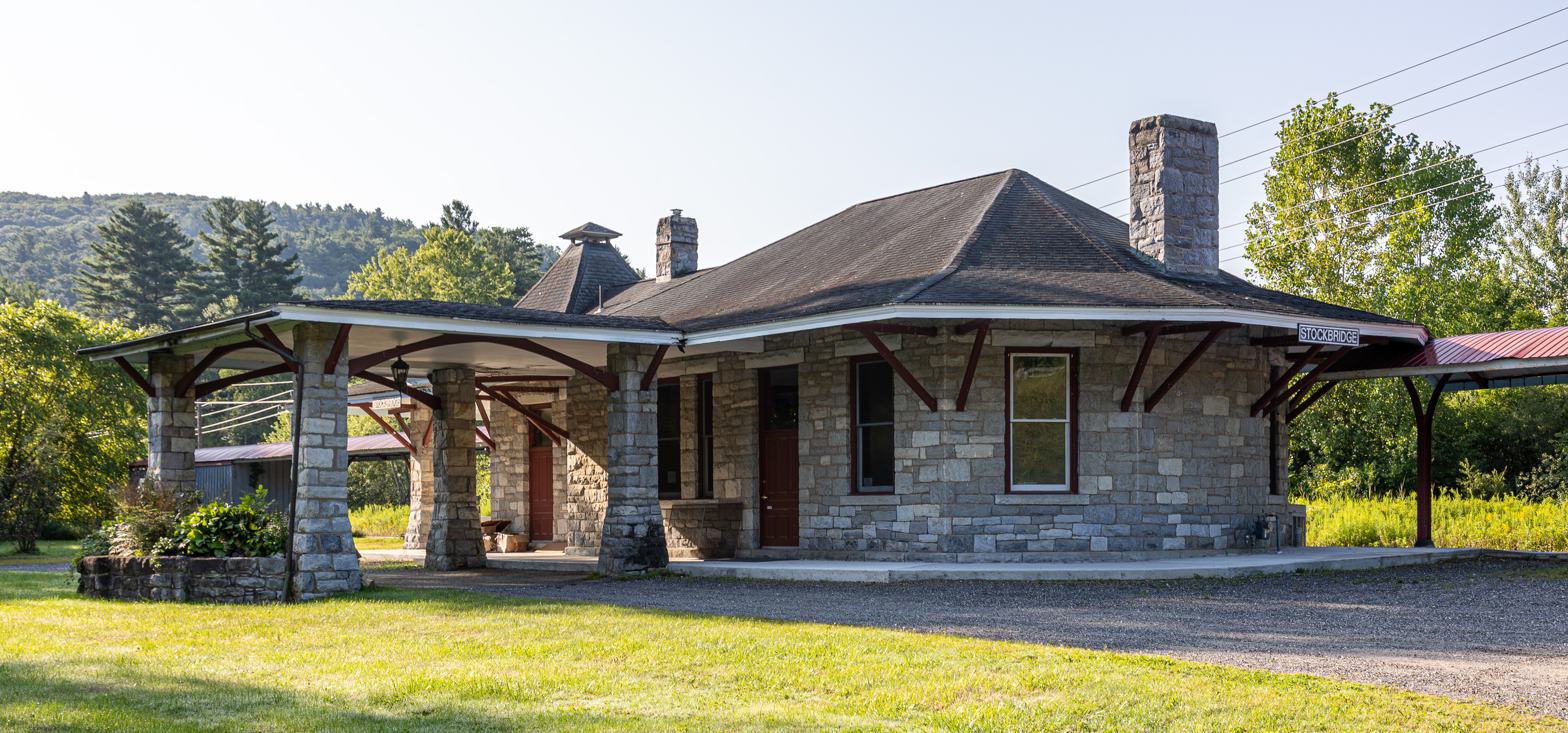
2025

The monopolistic New York, New Haven and Hartford Railroad (the New Haven) acquired the Housatonic Railroad in 1892 via lease, ending years of competition between the two companies. As the owner of numerous rail lines in the area, the Housatonic was not a significant route for the New Haven, though the extension to Botsford became an important freight route connecting Maybrook Yard to Cedar Hill Yard as the eastern portion of the Maybrook Line. Considered redundant, the original Housatonic main line was abandoned between Bridgeport and Stepney in 1940, as was duplicate trackage between Brookfield Junction and Hawleyville. The remainder of the original main line south of Botsford was abandoned in 1963, and the connection between West Stockbridge and the New York border followed the next year.

The New Haven era came to an end with its merger into the Penn Central Transportation Company at the end of 1968. The last remaining passenger train on the line was discontinued in 1971 upon the formation of Amtrak, and freight service heavily declined as well, but Penn Central did not abandon anymore of the Housatonic system.

=== Conrail and the Boston and Maine Railroad ===
When government-formed Conrail took over from Penn Central in 1976, it cut the line in two, abandoning the infrequently used 35 miles (56 km) between Canaan and New Milford. Conrail sold the northern segment to the Boston and Maine Railroad (B&M) in 1982. After Guilford Transportation Industries took over the B&M in 1984, union-busting attempts by Guilford's management resulted in strikes shutting down operations, and most freight customers fled the railroad as a result, with only one freight train a week operating after Guilford managed to reopen the line.

=== The new Housatonic Railroad ===
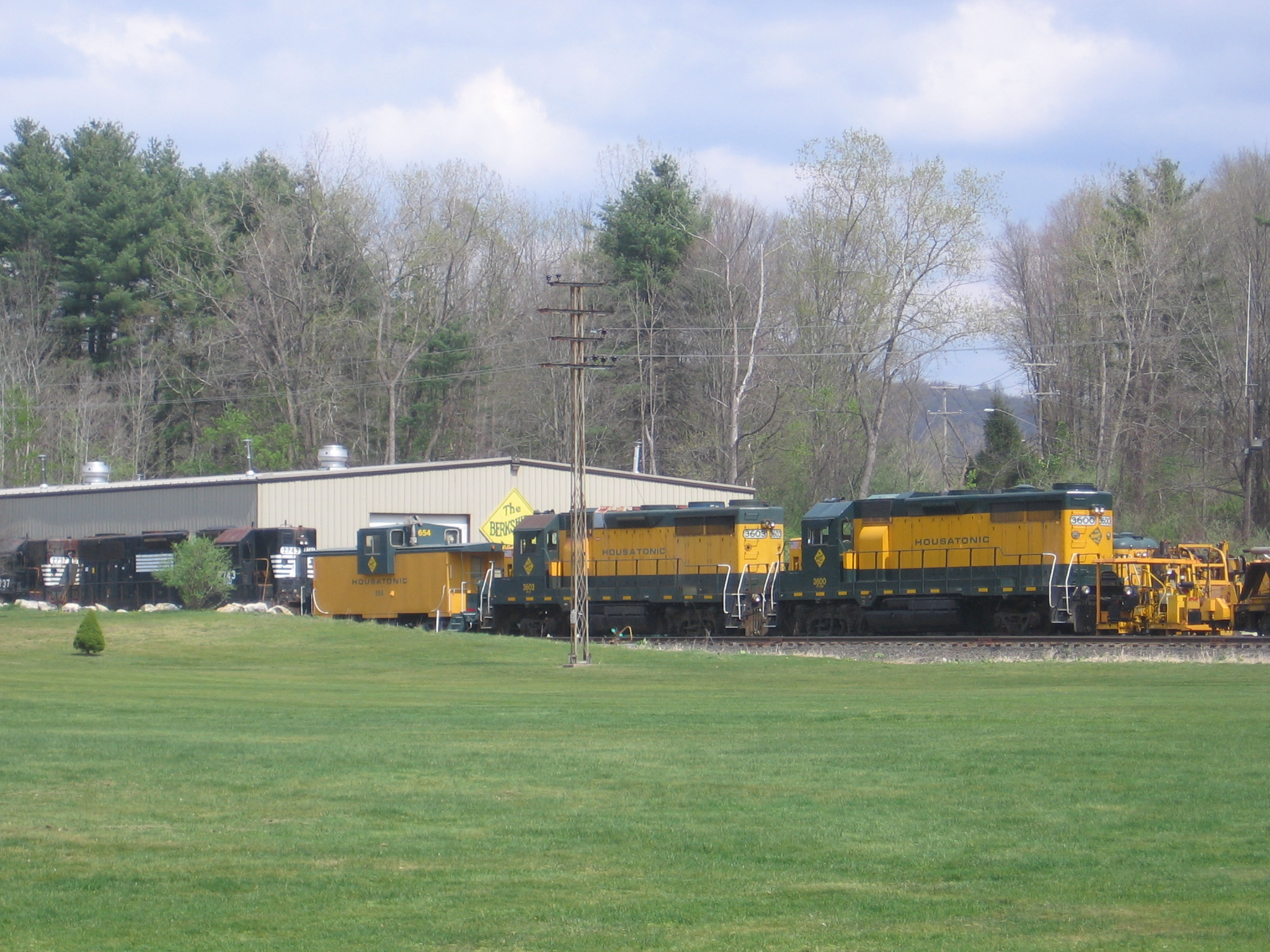
The headquarters of the modern incarnation of the Housatonic Railroad in Canaan, Connecticut

The trackage abandoned by Conrail in 1976 was restored in 1984 when a new Housatonic Railroad was formed and leased the Canaan to New Milford segment from the state of Connecticut, which had taken ownership following the Conrail abandonment. Initially the new Housatonic only operated excursion trains, but in 1989 freight service was restored as well. The Housatonic acquired the remaining pieces of the original railroad, purchasing the northern portion from Guilford in January 1991, and the southern portion from Conrail in late 1992.
