= Winnipauk station =

Former rail station in Norwalk, Connecticut

Winnipauk
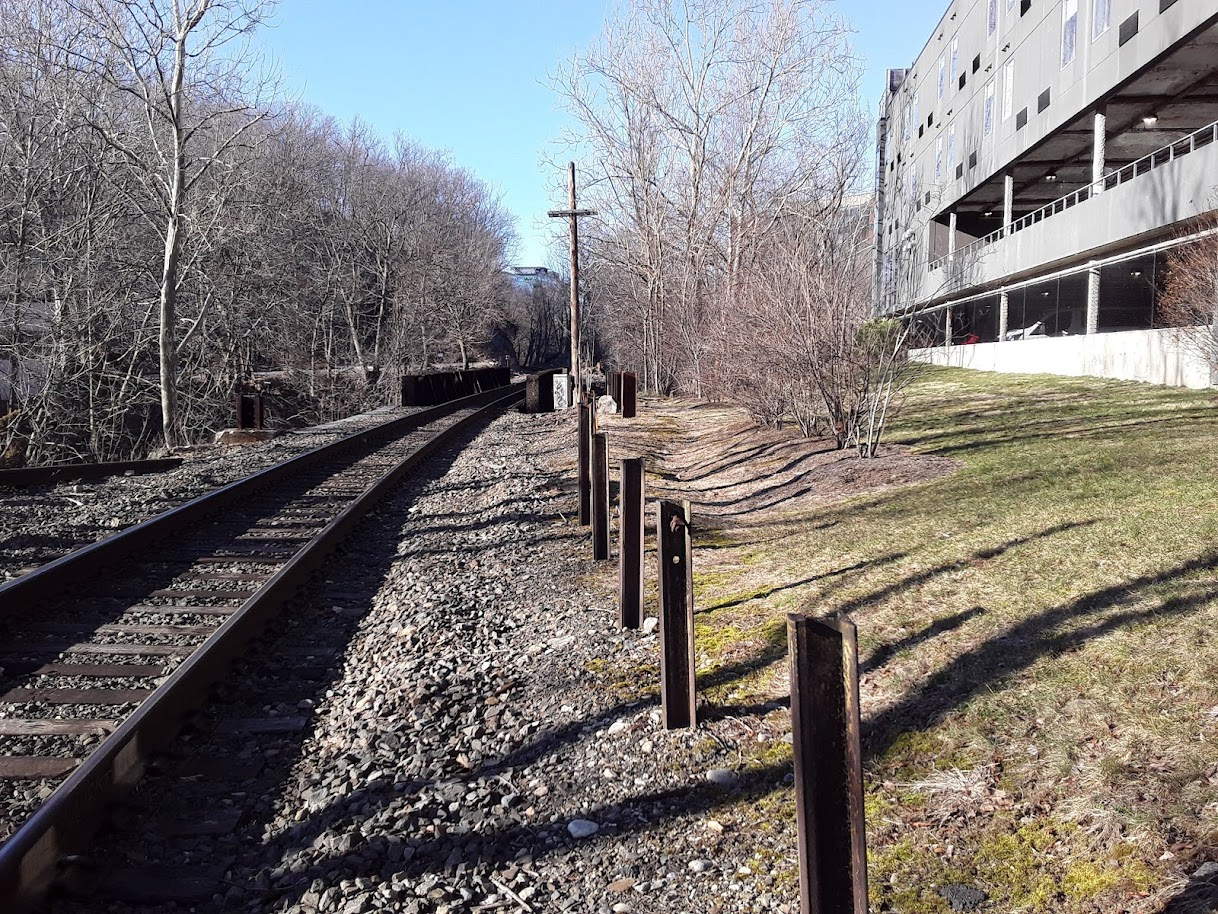
- Former site of the Winnipauk station in Norwalk, Connecticut

General information
- Coordinates: 41.1389°N 73.4269°W
- Tracks: 2

History
- Opened: 1852
- Closed: 1929
Location

Winnipauk was a station on the Danbury and Norwalk Railroad and later the Danbury Branch of the Housatonic Railroad and the New York, New Haven, and Hartford Railroad. Located in the Winnipauk section of the northern part of Norwalk, Connecticut, the station opened in 1852 and was an important stop that served nearby mills before it was closed in 1929.

== History ==
Coinciding with the opening of the D&N, Winnipauk station opened in February 1852. Located adjacent to the Winnipauk Woolen Mill, the station served as an important stop and was served by 2-3 trains each day through the late 1920s. However, by 1929 passenger service ceased and the station's agent was removed.

== Station layout ==
The station was located between the main Danbury Line and a shorter spur track that led into the Winnipauk Woolen Mill complex roughly 1300 feet south of the Merritt Parkway overpass of the Danbury Branch. Uncommon for smaller passenger stations of its time, The station had a large brick depot and had a high level side platform. The large brick depot continued to stand until the Winnipauk Woolen Mill complex was demolished circa 1960.
