= Sanford station (Connecticut) =

Train station in Redding, Connecticut, USA

Sanford
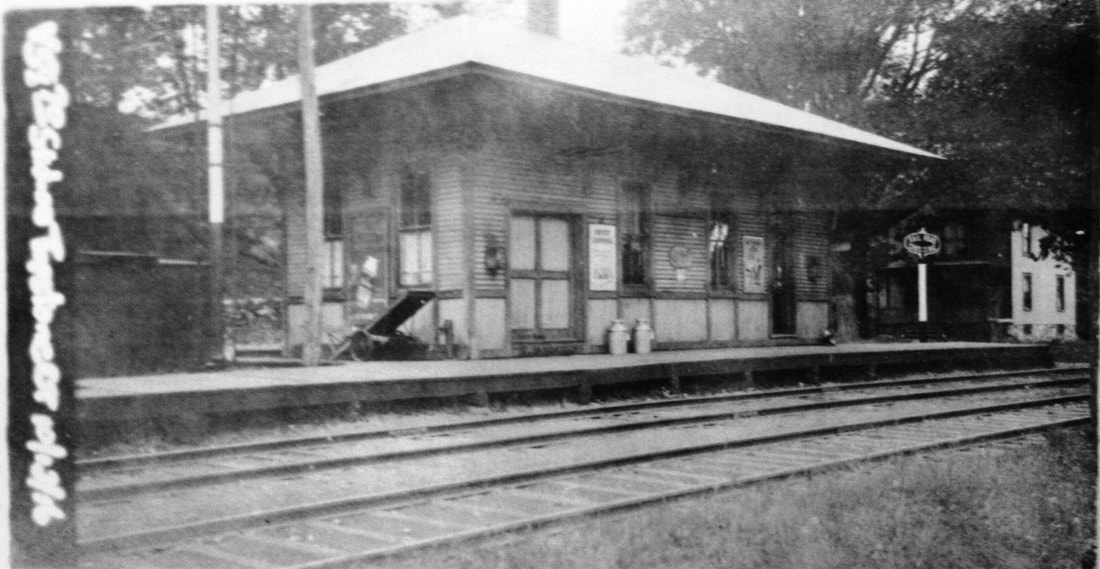
- Sanford station in 1916.

General information
- Other names: Topstone, Sanford's
- Coordinates: 41.300174°N 73.450182°W
- Tracks: 2

History
- Opening: 1852
- Closed: 1938
- Electrified: 1925
Location

Sanford station (also known as Sanford's and later called Topstone) was a passenger rail station on the Danbury and Norwalk Railroad and later the Danbury Branch of both the Housatonic Railroad and the New York, New Haven, and Hartford Railroad. The station was located on the border between Ridgefield and Redding, Connecticut, and was located on Topstone Road. Opened in 1852 as a flag stop and located in the Topstone section of Redding, Connecticut, the original station building was destroyed in 1891 by a speeding freight train. A new station building was erected the following year and would serve until the station's closure in 1938. The station was called so because of the numerous families named Sanford in the area surrounding the station.

== History ==
Sanford station first opened in 1852 as one of the original stations on the Danbury and Norwalk Railroad. On August 11, 1891, the original station building was destroyed when a northbound freight train derailed. The accident closed the line to traffic for two hours. By the early 1900s, the station had begun to serve local cider mills. In 1908, due to the station being confused with the Stamford station, the name of the station was changed to "Topstone", another name for the neighborhood around the station. In 1938, the station was sold for $50 and subsequently demolished in April of that year.

== Station layout ==
The station consisted of a main station house and an adjacent low-level side platform that was located on the west side of the Danbury Branch's two tracks at this location. The station was flanked on the north side by Topstone Road and on the west by Simpaug Turnpike in Redding.
