= New Haven and Derby Railroad =

Former railroad in Connecticut

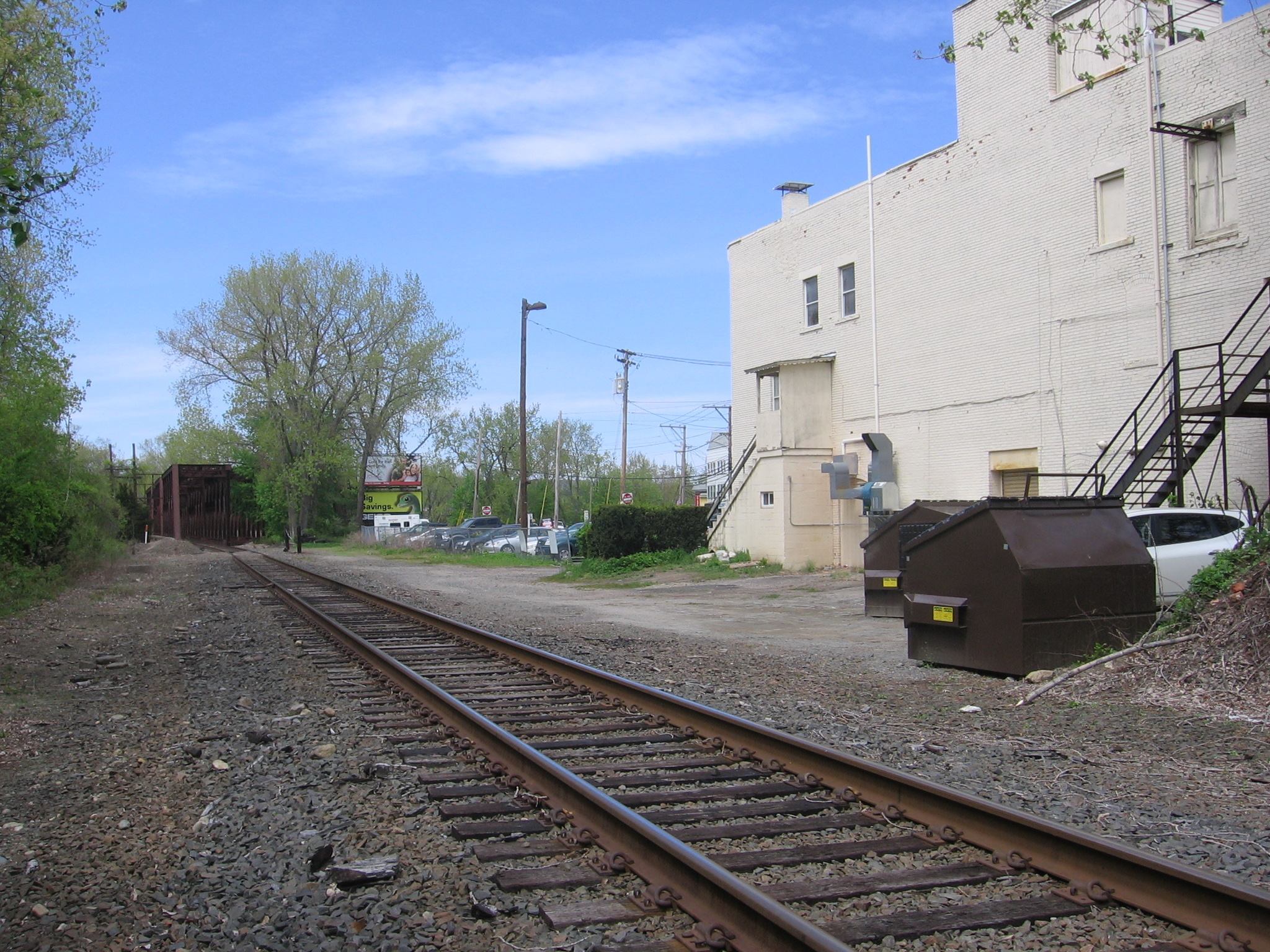
- The site of the railroad's former Derby Junction station. The station no longer exists, but the tracks are in service as part of Metro-North's Waterbury Branch.

Overview
- Current operator: Metro-North Railroad
- Dates of operation: 1871–1889
- Successor: Housatonic Railroad

Technical
- Track gauge: 4 ft 8 1/2 in (1,435 mm) standard gauge
- Length: 13 miles (21 km)

The New Haven and Derby Railroad (NH&D) was a railroad that connected the city of New Haven, Connecticut, with the town of Derby. The railroad was built between 1868 and 1871, when it began operations. The company was created by the city of New Haven, which owned it until 1889 when it was sold to the Housatonic Railroad. The Housatonic in turn was purchased by the New York, New Haven and Hartford Railroad in 1892. Passenger service existed between New Haven and Derby Junction until 1925 when it was discontinued.

The majority of the line was abandoned by the New Haven Railroad between 1939 and 1941. As of 2022, 3 miles (4.8 km) of track between Derby and Ansonia are the only remaining portion of the New Haven and Derby Railroad in service.

== History ==
=== Founding ===
A railroad between the city of New Haven and the town of Derby was first seriously proposed in 1867. A meeting to discuss the proposed railroad was held in New Haven that year, where it was decided that the city of New Haven would provide some of the funding for the railroad, along with private shareholders. In total, approximately $200,000 in 1867 dollars was raised in order to begin construction.

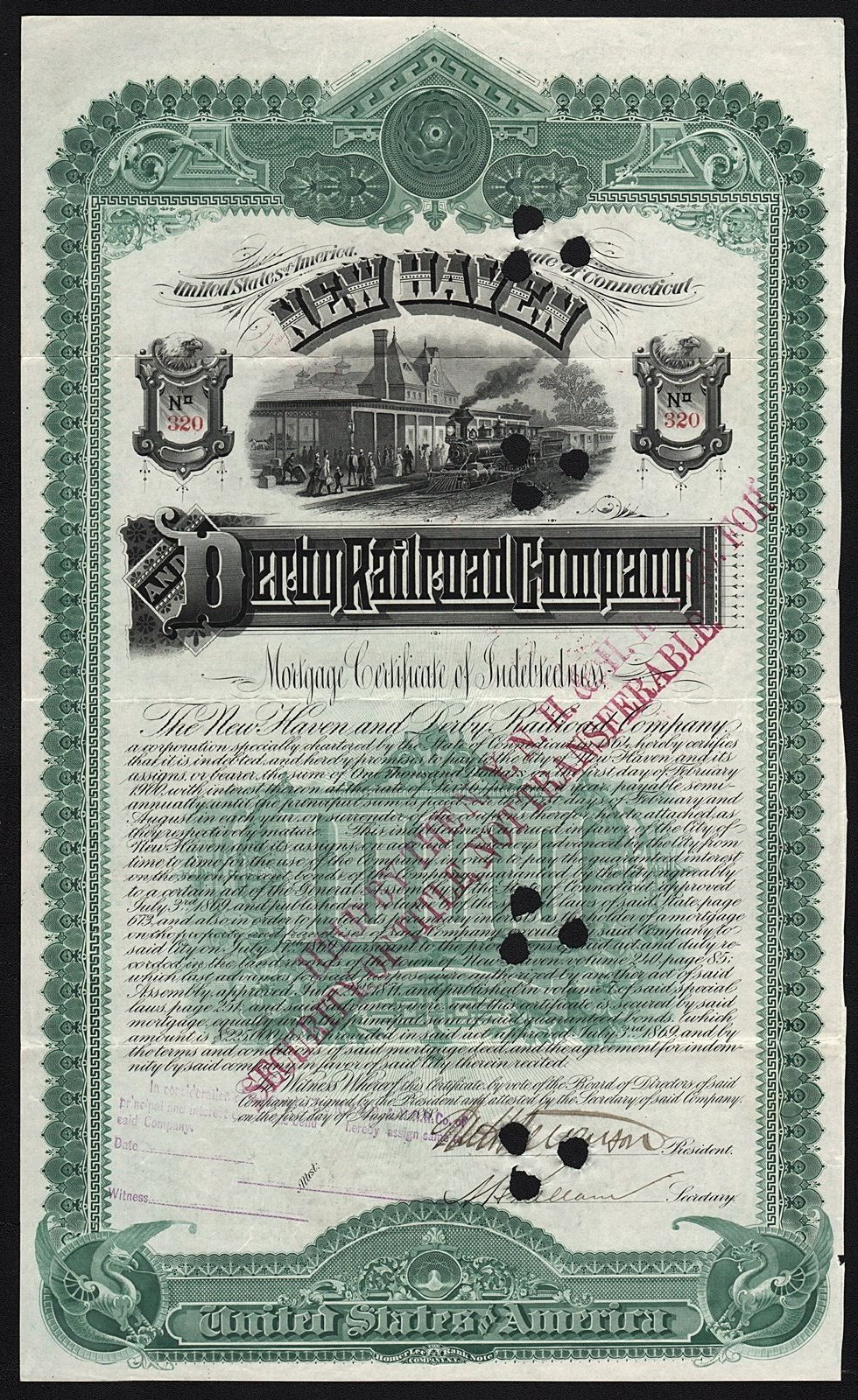
A mortgage certificate of the New Haven and Derby Railroad

=== Independent operations (1871–1889) ===
The company ran its first trains between its namesake cities in August 1871. From the start, the company had difficulty attracting sufficient business to justify the cost of operating its meandering route through rough terrain, and resorted to attempting to undercut the rates of competitor Naugatuck Railroad. This ended in 1879 when the two companies arranged a pooling agreement. The Naugatuck came under the control of the New York, New Haven and Hartford Railroad (The New Haven) in 1887, ending this arrangement. Seeing the line was in trouble, the city of New Haven decided to sell the company to another operator that same year. Two railroads placed bids: the New Haven railroad offered $300,000, while the Housatonic Railroad offered $275,000 and a promise to extend the line west of Derby Junction. The city accepted the Housatonic's offer, and the promised 14-mile-long (23 km) extension between Derby and the Housatonic's main line at Botsford, Connecticut, was constructed in 1888. The city formally leased the line to the Housatonic for a period of 99 years on July 10, 1889, ending its independence.

=== Purchase and dissolution (1889–1904) ===
Operations under the Housatonic Railroad were short lived, as the new owner of the NH&D was itself purchased by the New Haven Railroad in 1892. The New Haven and Derby continued to exist as a shell corporation until 1904, when the Connecticut Supreme Court condemned the two remaining shares of the company, ending its existence.

=== New Haven Railroad operations ===
The New Haven rationalized its parallel ex-New Haven and Derby Railroad and ex-Naugatuck Railroad routes through Derby into a single line in 1903–04; part of the original NH&D alignment was abandoned, while the NH&D alignment from Ansonia to the northern part of Derby was retained as part of the new route. In 1904, the New Haven planned to electrify the line with overhead trolley wire. Streetcars would have been run in a loop between New Haven Union Station and Derby using the ex-NH&D in one direction and the existing New Haven–Derby streetcar line on the return trip.

The route of the New Haven and Derby Railroad was of limited importance to the New Haven, as it largely duplicated other lines in Connecticut. Passenger trains last operated over the line in 1925, and freight service between Orange and West Haven was terminated the same year, though none of the route was formally abandoned at this time. An attempt by the New Haven to abandon the line between Derby Junction and West Haven in 1939 was unsuccessful, as customers served by the line in Orange protested to the Interstate Commerce Commission (ICC). The ICC allowed abandonment of the completely unused segment between Orange and West Haven, but required service continue on the rest of the line. A second attempt to abandon most of the line was successful in 1941, though rail-served customers in Orange again objected.

From 1941 onwards, only the segment between Derby and Ansonia and a spur track in the city of New Haven remained active. The spur in New Haven served several local industries until at least the 1980s, but was abandoned by the year 2000, leaving only the NH&D alignment from Derby to Ansonia in use by Metro-North Railroad.

== Station and junction listing ==
Mileages reflect the post-1892 route using the West River Branch to access Union Station, and the 1903–04 relocation in Derby.

Miles (km)	City	Station	Connections and notes
0.0 (0.0)	New Haven	New Haven Union Station	Junction with NYNH&H mainline, New Haven–Springfield Line, Shore Line, and Canal Line
1.5 (2.4)	New Haven	Junction with pre-1892 NH&D mainline (no station)	
1.9 (3.0)	West Haven	West Haven	
5.0 (8.0)	Orange	Tyler City	
6.6 (10.6)	Orange	Orange	
10.6 (17.0)	Derby	Derby Junction	Junction with Naugatuck Railroad
10.8 (17.3)	Derby	Junction with Housatonic Railroad (no station)	
11.0 (17.7)	Derby	Derby	
12.7 (20.5)	Ansonia	Ansonia	Junction with Naugatuck Railroad
