= List of New York, New Haven and Hartford Railroad precursors =

These railroads were bought, leased, or in other ways had their track come under ownership or lease by the New York, New Haven and Hartford Railroad. The NYNH&H was formed in 1872 as a merge of the New York and New Haven Railroad and Hartford and New Haven Railroad.

== Old Colony Railroad 1893 ==
- Boston and Providence Railroad 1888
  - Stoughton Branch Railroad 1872
- Boston, Clinton, Fitchburg and New Bedford Railroad 1879
  - Boston, Clinton and Fitchburg Railroad 1876
    - Agricultural Branch Railroad 1869
    - Fitchburg and Worcester Railroad 1869
    - Framingham and Lowell Railroad 1871
    - Mansfield and Framingham Railroad 1870
    - New Bedford Railroad 1875
      - New Bedford and Taunton Railroad 1874
        - Fairhaven Branch Railroad 1868
      - Taunton Branch Railroad 1873
- Cape Cod Railroad 1872
  - Cape Cod Branch Railroad 1868
  - Cape Cod Central Railroad 1868
- Duxbury and Cohasset Railroad 1878
- Fall River, Warren and Providence Railroad 1892
- Granite Railroad 1870
- Hanover Branch of Massachusetts Railroad 1887
- Middleborough and Taunton Railroad 1874
- Nantasket Beach Railroad 1888
- Old Colony and Newport Railroad 1872
  - Dighton and Somerset Railroad 1864
  - Easton Branch Railroad 1866
  - Newport and Fall River Railroad 1863
  - Old Colony and Fall River Railroad 1864
    - Fall River Railroad 1854
    - Middleborough Railroad 1895
    - Old Colony Railway 1854
      - Dorchester and Milton Railroad 1847
    - Randolph and Bridgewater Railroad 1845
- Plymouth and Middleborough Railroad 1892
- Providence, Warren and Bristol Railroad 1891
- South Shore Railroad 1876

== New England Railroad 1898 ==
- New York and New England Railroad 1896
  - Boston, Hartford and Erie Railroad 1873
    - Norwich and Worcester Railroad 1869
      - Boston, Norwich and New London Railroad Company 1837
      - Worcester and Norwich Railroad Company 1837
    - Midland Railway 1866
      - Boston and New York Central Railroad 1858
        - Norfolk County Railroad 1853
        - Southbridge and Blackstone Railroad 1853
    - New York and Boston Railroad 1864
      - Charles River Branch Railroad 1855
      - Woonsocket Union Railroad 1858
    - Thompson and Willimantic Railroad 1863
  - Connecticut Central Railroad 1880
    - Springfield and New London Railroad 1876
  - Hartford, Providence and Fishkill Railroad 1878
    - Hartford and Providence Railroad 1849
    - Providence and Plainfield Railroad 1849
    - Rhode Island Railroad 1849
    - Rockville Branch Railroad 1868
  - Meriden, Waterbury and Connecticut River Railroad 1892
    - Meriden and Cromwell Railroad 1889
    - Meriden and Waterbury Railroad 1889
  - Milford and Woonsocket Railroad 1887
    - Hopkinton Railroad 1883
    - Milford, Franklin and Providence Railroad 1883
  - Providence and Springfield Railroad 1890
  - Rhode Island and Massachusetts Railroad 1877
  - Woonsocket and Pascoag Railroad 1890
- Norwich and Worcester Railroad 1895

== Housatonic Railroad 1892 ==
- Berkshire Railroad 1843
- Danbury and Norwalk Railroad 1886
- Danbury Terminal Railroad 1997
- New Haven and Derby Railroad 1889
- New York, Housatonic and Northern Railroad 1876
- Shepaug, Litchfield and Northern Railroad 1891
  - Shepaug Railroad 1887
  - Shepaug Valley Railroad 1873
- Stockbridge and Pittsfield Railroad 1874
- West Stockbridge Railroad 1843

== Boston and New York Air-Line Railroad 1883 ==
- New Haven, Middletown and Willimantic Railroad 1875

== Central New England Railway 1927 ==
- Newburgh, Dutchess and Connecticut Railroad 1905
  - Clove Branch Railroad 1896
  - Dutchess and Columbia Railway 1877
    - New York, Boston and Montreal Railway 1874
      - Harlem Extension Railroad 1873
        - Lebanon Springs Railroad 1870
      - New York, Boston and Northern Railway 1873
        - Dutchess and Columbia Railroad 1872
- Philadelphia, Reading and New England Railroad 1899
  - Central New England and Western Railroad 1892
    - Hartford and Connecticut Western Railroad 1890
      - Connecticut Western Railroad 1881
      - Rhinebeck and Connecticut Railroad 1882
  - Dutchess County Railroad 1892
- Poughkeepsie and Eastern Railroad 1907
  - New York and Massachusetts Railroad 1893
    - Poughkeepsie, Hartford and Boston Railroad 1887
      - Poughkeepsie and Eastern Railway 1875

== Hartford and Connecticut Valley Railroad 1887 ==
- Connecticut Valley Railroad 1880

== New York and New Haven Railroad 1872 ==
- New Haven and Northampton Railroad 1849
  - Hampshire and Hampden Railroad 1862
  - Holyoke and Westfield Railroad 1870
- Shore Line Railway 1870
  - New Haven, New London and Stonington Railroad 1868
    - New Haven and New London Railroad 1857
    - New London and Stonington Railroad 1857
    - New York and New London Railroad 1857

== Hartford and New Haven Railroad 1872 ==
- Hartford and Springfield Railroad 1847
- Middletown Railroad 1850
- New Britain and Middletown Railroad 1868

== Naugatuck Railroad 1887 ==
- Watertown and Waterbury Railroad 1870

== Stamford and New Canaan Railroad 1884 ==
- New Canaan Railroad 1883

== New York, Providence and Boston Railroad 1893 ==
- Pawtuxet Valley Railroad 1883
- Pontiac Branch Railroad 1880
- Providence and Worcester Railroad 1888
- Warwick Railroad 1879
- Westerly Granite Railroad 1881
