= Danbury and Norwalk Railroad =

American railroad

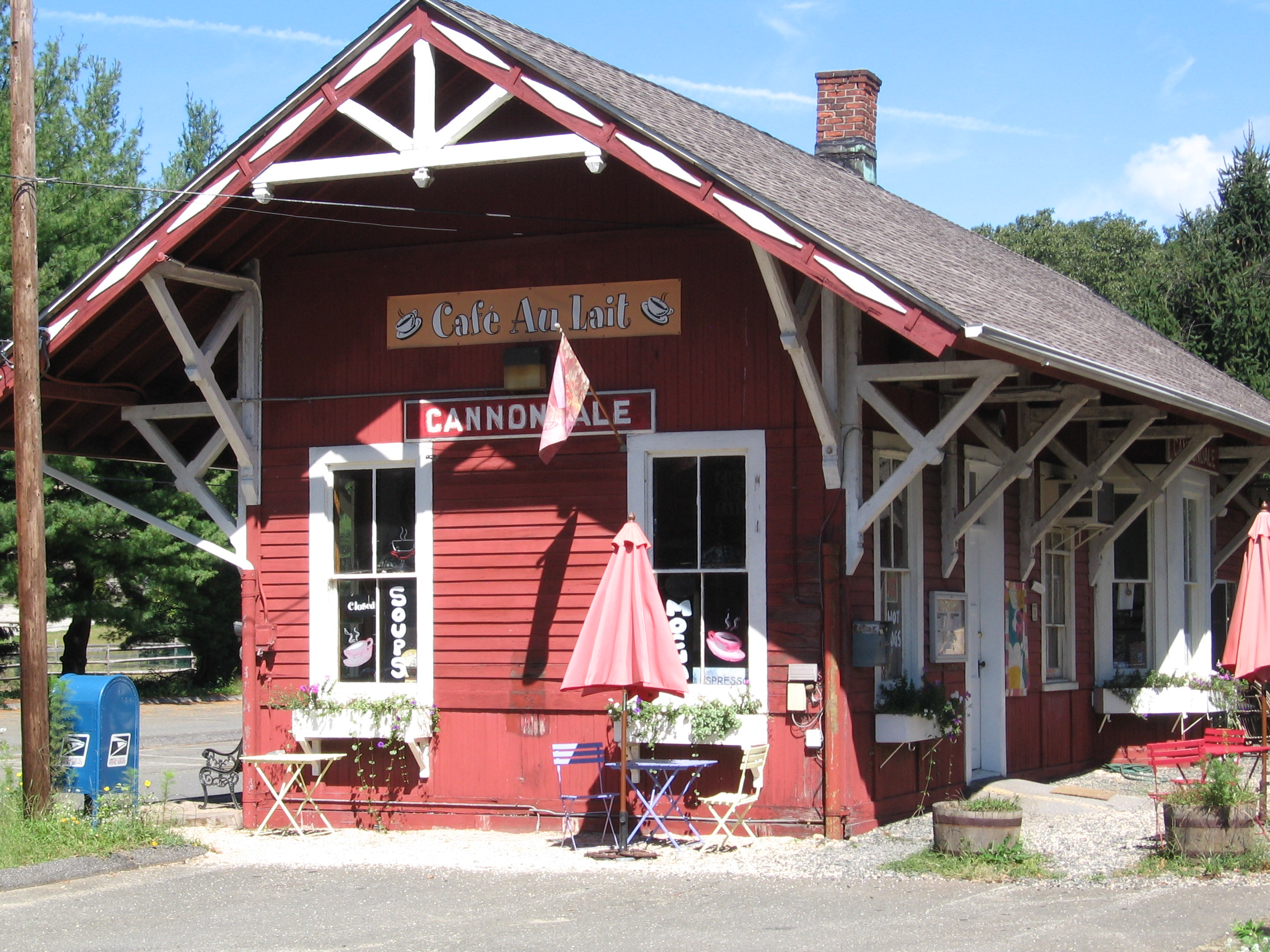

Overview
- Operator: Metro-North Railroad (passenger); Housatonic Railroad (freight); Providence and Worcester Railroad (freight)
- Headquarters: Danbury
- Locale: Danbury, CT to Norwalk, CT
- Dates of operation: 1852–1887
- Successor: Housatonic Railroad

Technical
- Track gauge: 4 ft 8 1/2 in (1,435 mm) standard gauge

The Danbury and Norwalk Railroad, chartered in 1836 as the Fairfield County Railroad, was an independent American railroad that operated between the cities of Danbury and Norwalk, Connecticut from 1852 until its absorption by the Housatonic Railroad in 1886. The right of way established by the D&N continues in operation and is now the Danbury Branch of the New Haven Line of the Metro-North Railroad.

== History ==
=== Fairfield County Railroad, 1835-1850 ===
The Danbury and Norwalk Railroad was chartered May 1835 as the Fairfield County Railroad. The objective of the railroad was to build from Danbury to somewhere on Long Island Sound. The backers wanted to end Danbury's isolation. Professor Alexander C. Twining of Yale University was hired to conduct a survey. Several options were researched, and Professor Twining recommended the route following the Norwalk River. This route would come through Norwalk and South Norwalk, and terminate on the northern shores of Long Island Sound at Belden's Point. It was longer than other options, but the total travel time to New York City was shorter, because less travel over water was needed.

The railroad was initially planned as a horsedrawn railroad, which would have been a significant improvement on the unpaved toll roads. A coach took a half day for the journey, but horse-drawn rail cars were estimated to make the Danbury to Norwalk trip in 3 hours. As financing the project was a problem, attention was paid to the area north of Danbury, along the Housatonic River. If these places would be connected, more options would come available to financing the railroad.

A survey was performed By Mr. E H. Broadhead. This route would connect Danbury by a 70-mile route with the Western Railroad at West Stockbridge, Massachusetts. Then in 1836 the Housatonic Railroad was chartered in Bridgeport. Danbury was offered a subscription to the new railroad for $100,000, but Danbury declined. The Housatonic Railroad started building its railroad, bypassing Danbury, and going north along the route that was surveyed for the Fairfield County Railroad.

=== 1850-1852 ===
On May 29, 1850 the charter of the Fairfield County Railroad was once again renewed, but the name was changed to the Danbury and Norwalk Railroad. On June 7, 1850 the company was organized with Eli T. Hoyt as president.

The surveyed route to Norwalk from Danbury was built, but not the extension to Belden's Neck. The railroad would connect to the New York & New Haven in South Norwalk.

In the fall of 1850, construction began, with Beard, Church and Company of Derby, Connecticut the general contractor as chosen in a bidding process. The work began even before all the land had been secured. In general, work proceeded from south to north. The route closely followed the Norwalk River in order to avoid grades (inclines). A grade of only one percent would have severely limited the size of trains that could be used. As a result of the proximity to the river, the Danbury line has had a history of occasional flooding. Major floods occurred in 1853, 1854 and, much later in 1955, all of which briefly closed the line. In the first few years, many of the bridges and fills along the line needed to be replaced.

Construction of the railroad was done by subcontractors. In Wilton, for instance, local entrepreneur Charles Cannon became a subcontractor. From March to December 1851 he employed between 51 and 86 Irishmen each month in constructing roadbeds and laying tracks. One working man, Timothy Sullivan, was paid 75 cents per day, working six days most weeks in March, for a total of $14.44. Of that, $10 was deducted for board. Elsewhere along the line, most of the laborers were Irish, but not all. They worked with hand tools and help from a small number of animals. No explosives were used to blast away rock ledges.

On February 25, 1852 the railroad opened to regular service. A simple schedule of two trains in each direction was run each day, one mixed and one passenger train. The initial dividend at the end of the first year was 5.25%.

The railroad allowed travelers from Danbury to get to New York City in the same amount of time it had taken a stage coach to get to South Norwalk. One stage driver in Danbury, Henry Banks, became D&N's first passenger conductor. According to L. Peter Cornwall, a historian who has written about the Danbury Line, "Well-liked and respected up and down the line, Mr. Banks was noted for his suave and courtly manner as well as his elaborate announcements during the train's progress from station to station.

=== 1853-1872 ===
An additional passenger round trip was added to the schedule. The railroad was making a good profit because the railroad did not have any competitors along its road. These resulted in slow speeds and high profits. In 1862 the Norwalk Horse Railway Company was formed with Edwin Lockwood as president. This company would connect South Norwalk with Norwalk. This would take revenue away from the railroad. The response of the D&N was to compete. To make its track suitable for horse-drawn carriages, boards were placed between tracks. In April 1862 operation between Norwalk (Wall Street) and South Norwalk started with small cars. The next year, nine steam or horse-drawn trains would run between these two stations. But by 1863 the horse railway was operational and was a major success. Higher frequencies, lower fares and more stops were pleasing the public. The D&N withdrew its service quickly thereafter.

In 1864 Edwin Lockwood, uncle of LeGrand Lockwood, became president of the D&N. The Lockwoods, natives of Norwalk, were major stockholders in the railroad. A line from Danbury to Brookfield was considered. It would have given the D&N an important connection. But another railroad was already organised to build along the right of way needed by the D&N. The New York, Housatonic & Northern was opened between Danbury and Brookfield in 1868. During construction there was a connection between the D&N and the NYH&N, but it was torn up after construction finished.

In 1869 construction of the branch from Branchville (formerly Ridgefield) to Ridgefield started. The 4 mile branch was very difficult to construct due to the steep climb needed to reach Ridgefield. On June 25, 1870 the first trains started running, and the official opening was held on July 1, 1870.

In Spring 1872 a branch between Bethel and Hawleyville was started. It allowed for connections with the Shepaug Valley Railroad, Housatonic Railroad, and eventually the Boston, Hartford and Erie Railroad once it was completed through Hawleyville. There were plans in which the D&N would be a link in a railroad connecting New York and Boston, but these died with LeGrand Lockwood, the nephew and financial backer of Edwin Lockwood, in 1872.

=== 1872-1886 ===
In 1873 the railroad was now running six locomotives, which all were running on coal. Three of them were new and three were converted from wood. On June 18, 1873, Roswell Pettibone Flower became president of the railroad. Even through the depression the railroad was kept into good shape and investments were being made. The railroad remained a very modern one. Plans for further extensions were put aside, and focus was on improving the lines already present. 56 Pound steel was replacing iron rails. The best iron rails were being used to relay yards and sidings. Also the branches were improved with the old iron rails. In 1879 all passenger cars were equipped with air brakes. In 1880 a tract of land in Redding was bought. It was already used for religious camps. The railroad promoted it as an ideal place for a day in the country. The summer resort attracted many passengers, most of whom were moved on regular trains. The schedule called for three passenger trains and a freight train in each direction on the mainline. Three trips were made on the Ridgefield Branch. The Hawleyville branch was operated by the Shepaug Valley Railroad.

An additional train started running between Bethel and Danbury, which provided service for the large number of commuters between these two towns, working in the factories near the Danbury yard.

In 1881, James W. Hyatt succeeded Roswell P. Flower as president. Just before the take over plans were started to build the final stretch from South Norwalk to Belden's Point. This would give the railroad a direct connection with New York City and other points along the Sound by means of ferries. Construction started quickly and on July 4, 1882, the pier was opened. The new pier was an enormous boost to traffic on the line. Trains were running 24 hours a day. Just after completion of the pier James W. Hyatt was succeeded by F. St. John Lockwood. The new pier made the D&N a very interesting railroad to take over. On October 1, 1886, the D&N would become the Danbury & Norwalk Division of the Housatonic Railroad, by means of a 99-year lease. This was eight years after the first proposal by the HRR.

=== 1886 and later ===
The Housatonic Railroad relayed tracks between Hawleyville and Bethel with steel track. Housatonic trains were now routed towards Wilsons Point instead of Bridgeport. The D&N division was getting busier every year. Especially when the NY & NE started diverting its traffic towards Wilsons Point after it lost its original connection with New York City. The Housatonic Railroad leased the D&N starting July 21, 1887. Around 1891 the Long Island Rail Road and the New York and New England Railroad started running the Long Island and Eastern States Express which connected the LIRR's Oyster Bay Branch via ferry to the D&N at Belden's point and proceeded to Hawleyville for connections to the New York and New England Railroad with service to Boston.

On July 21, 1892 the Housatonic Railroad was taken over by the New York, New Haven and Hartford Railroad. The D&N was subsequently leased to the NYNH&H. Later on there was an exchange in stocks, and the NYNH&H owned the D&N outright. The NYNH&H merged into Penn Central in 1969. On January 1, 1971, the State of Connecticut leased passenger and freight operations on the Danbury Branch to Penn Central.

The state contracted with the federally formed Consolidated Rail Corporation (Conrail) to operate freight and passenger service on the line from 1976 until the cessation of Conrail passenger service in 1983. Conrail freight service on the line ended in 1993.

The Connecticut Department of Transportation now owns the former D&N line. Freight service is provided by the Providence and Worcester Railroad since 1993 also by a newly formed Housatonic Railroad. With the formation of Metro-North Railroad in 1983 the D&N became the Danbury Branch of that railroad's New Haven Line.

== Routes ==
=== Main line ===
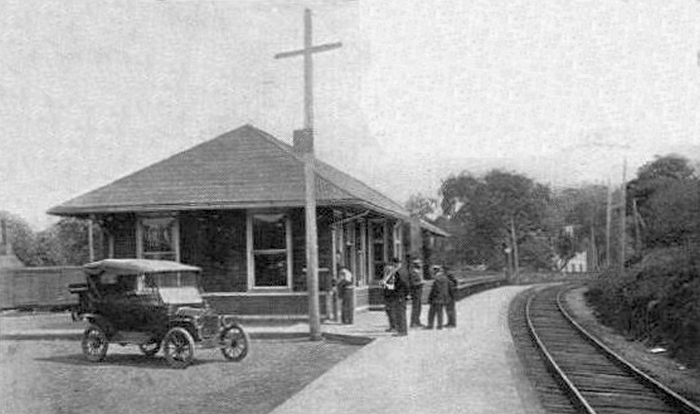
Postcard of Georgetown station

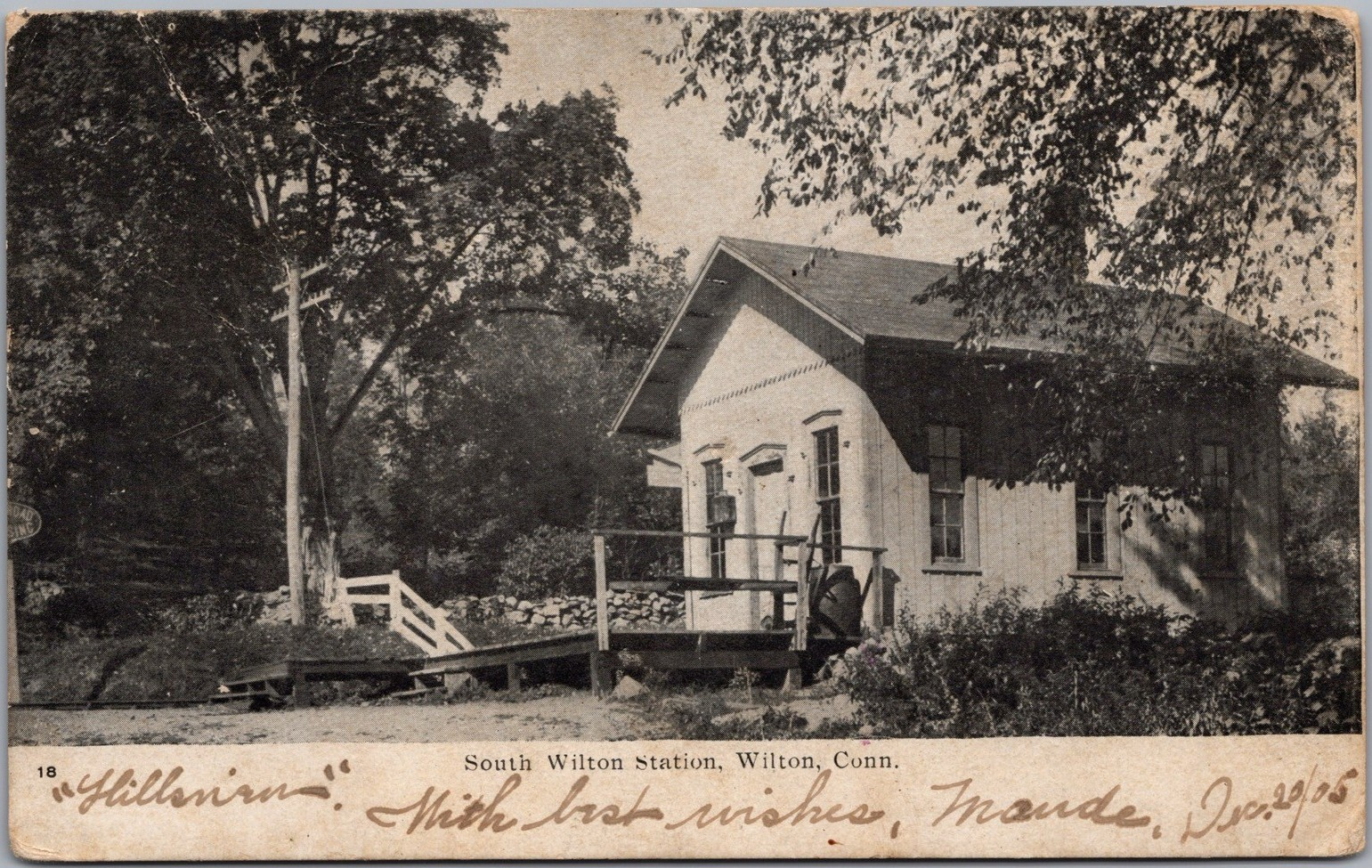
Postcard of South Wilton station

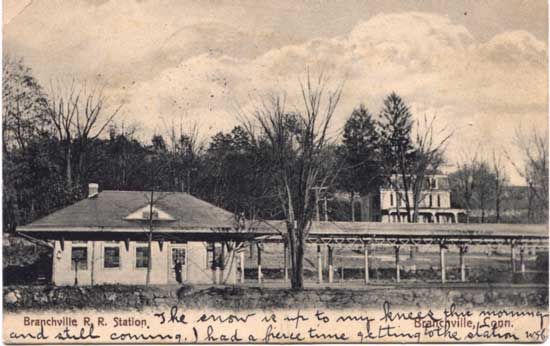
Postcard of Branchville station

South to North

Stop	Type	Opened*	Description
Wilsons Point	Station	July 1882	Pier giving transfer to ferries to Oyster Bay, NY.
South Norwalk	Station	1848	Interchange with NY&NH until 1872, NYNH&H thereafter
Norwalk/Wall street	Station	1852	Commonly known as "Wall Street"
Winnipauk	Station	1852	Located 0.7 Miles (1.13 km) south of today's Merritt 7
South Wilton	Station	1852	Was known as "Kent" until 1886. Or "Hopkins" in some schedules
Wilton	Station	1852	Original station building was moved to the southeastern intersection of Rt. 7 and Rt. 33 to serve as an office
Cannon/Cannondale	Station	1852	Although the original depot burned in 1891, the Depot built to replace is still active today and is on the NRHP.
Georgetown	Station	1852	The Gilbert and Bennett wire company (founded 1818) was a significant freight customer
Branchville/Ridgefield (before branch opened)	Station	1852	Interchange with the branch to Ridgefield.
Sanford/Sanford's station	Flag stop	1852	Later known as Topstone
Redding	station	1852	
Bethel	Station	1852	Start of Hawleyville branch in 1872
Danbury	Union station	1852	Interchange with NY&NE and the Housatonic

* only if opened after rest of line in 1852.

=== Ridgefield Branch ===
The Ridgefield branch opened July 1, 1870 from Branchville on the main line and had one terminal station at Ridgefield as well as two flag stops along the way at Florida and Cooper. Trains generally consisted of two cars; one passenger car, plus a combination car for baggage, express and mail. Freight cars were added as needed. Ridgefield had a one-stall engine house and a turntable. Passenger service was abandoned on The Ridgefield Branch in 1925. Although the branch remained active until freight service was abandoned by the NYNH&H in 1964. The branch was later turned into the Ridgefield Rail Trail.

=== Hawleyville Branch ===
There was only one siding located along the branch. At Hawleyville there was an interchange with the New York and New England Railroad. The Hawleyville interchange was in addition to the one at Danbury. At Hawleyville connections could be made to the rest of the Housatonic (Bridgeport to the south, Massachusetts to the north) as well as the Shepaug Railroad (to Litchfield northeast). The Hawleyville Branch was abandoned by the NYNH&H in 1911 and was one of the first line abandonments of the railroad.

== See also ==
- List of New York, New Haven and Hartford Railroad precursors
