= Shepaug, Litchfield and Northern Railroad =

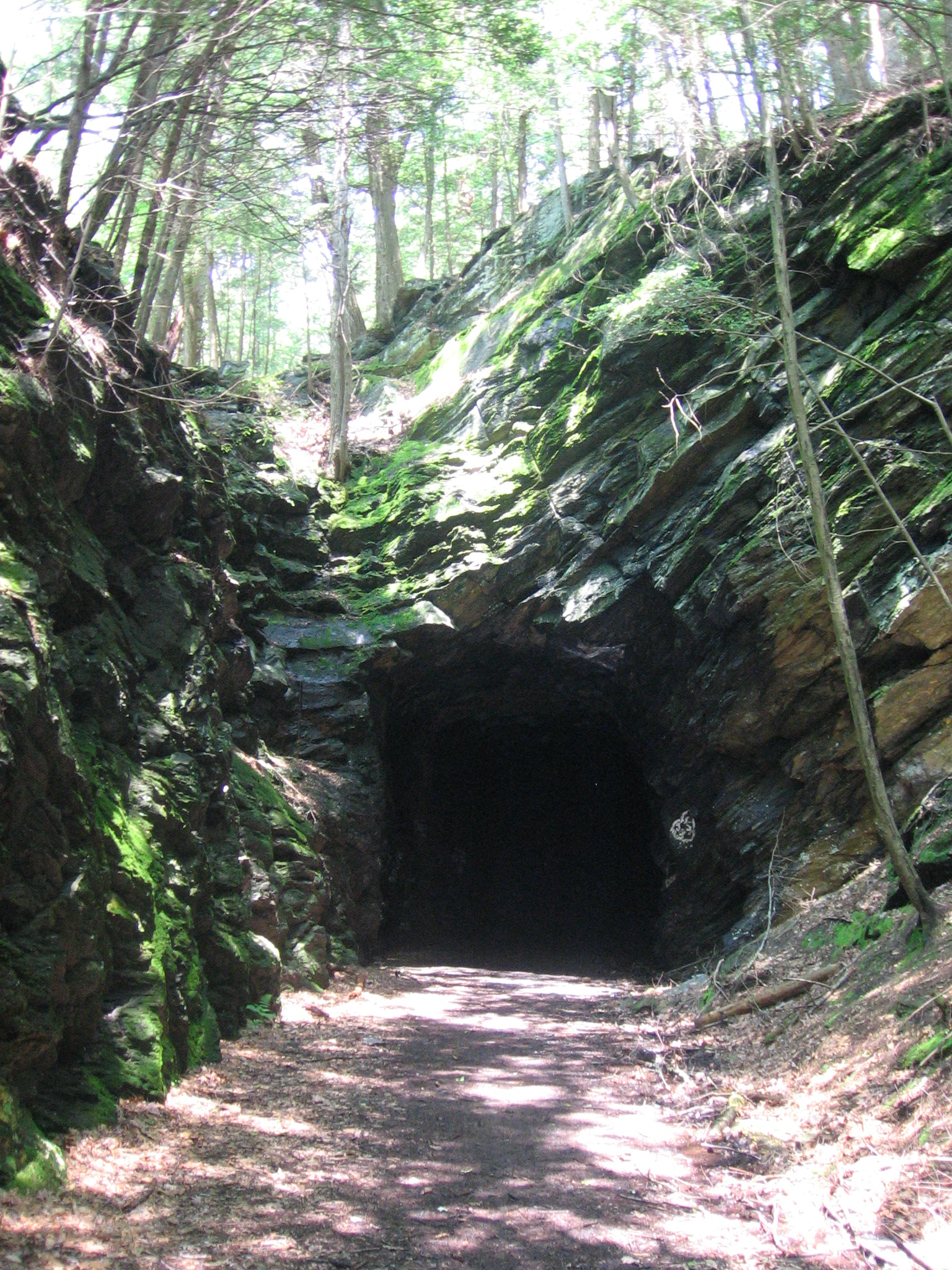
- South portal of the tunnel in Washington, May 28, 2012

Overview
- Headquarters: Litchfield
- Locale: Hawleyville, CT to Litchfield, CT
- Dates of operation: 1871–1891 / 1948
- Predecessor: Shepaug Valley Railroad (1868-1873); Shepaug Railroad (1873-1887)
- Successor: Housatonic (1891-1898); NYNH&H (1898-1948)

Technical
- Track gauge: 4 ft 8 1/2 in (1,435 mm) standard gauge
- Length: 32 miles (51 km)

The Shepaug, Litchfield and Northern Railroad was a short independent railroad in western Connecticut that was chartered as the Shepaug Valley Railroad in 1868 and operated from 1872 to 1891 when it was taken over by the Housatonic Railroad. In 1898, the Housatonic operation was assumed by the New York, New Haven & Hartford Railroad (NH). As the Litchfield Division of the NH, the line was operated until abandonment in 1948. Much of the line remains as a rail trail.

== History ==
=== Charter and commissioning ===
"Shepaug" in the railroad's name derived from the name of the Shepaug River, followed by most of the line, which in turn was a Mohegan name that meant "rocky water".

The railroad was chartered in 1868 and opened for operation in 1872, as the Shepaug Valley Railroad. J. Deming Perkins was the company's first president. Henry R. Colt was the treasurer and Edwin McNeill was the superintendent. Regular service to Litchfield started by January 11, 1872. Due to the expense of building and maintaining the line through rocky rural terrain the railroad suffered low profitability throughout its existence. To help pay creditors it was reorganized as the Shepaug Railroad in 1873 and was again reorganized as the Shepaug, Litchfield and Northern (or SL&N) in 1887.

=== Early operations ===
The first three 30–ton 4-4-0 steam locomotives to run on the Shepaug line were from the Rogers Locomotive and Machine Works of Paterson, New Jersey named Shepaug, Weatinaug, and Waramaug. In addition to passenger traffic, the railroad shipped freight. Gail Borden's condensed milk business had started operation in the Burrville section of Torrington in the 1860s. Strong sales during the Civil War led to expansion in the 1870s. A new Borden creamery was built and started shipping dairy products out of Washington Depot soon after the start of operations on the SL&N. Other significant freight shippers included stone quarries near Roxbury and New Preston (marble and granite) and ice cut from Bantam Lake.

At first, the SL&N would run two trains down from Litchfield toward Hawleyville with two return trains later in the day each weekday. A single passenger and a separate freight train ran on Saturdays. The need to get milk as fresh as possible to New York City markets led to runs of a Sunday milk train. At first the milk was delivered to Hawleyville to be picked up by the Housatonic and then carried to Bridgeport and on to New York. Eventually the creamery at Hawleyville was closed as was the Hawleyville branch, by which time the milk train ran through Danbury to South Norwalk.

In 1872, the railroad reached an agreement with the Danbury and Norwalk Railroad to operate trains on that company's newly constructed 6-mile (9.7 km) Hawleyville Branch to Bethel. Eventually the SL&N would run trains from Litchfield down to South Norwalk for connection with the New Haven or to Wilson's Point for ferry service connection to either New York or to Oyster Bay on Long Island.

=== 1898 and later, the New Haven era ===
On July 1, 1898, the New Haven Railroad leased the Shepaug, Litchfield and Northern from the Housatonic and operated it as its Litchfield Branch until business weakened in the first half of the 20th century. The Borden Creamery in Washington was closed down in 1928. Passenger service on the Shepaug Division was stopped by 1932 and the New Haven petitioned the Interstate Commerce Commission to abandon the line as a freight road in 1947. The ICC granted permission to abandon the line in 1948 which is when freight service stopped on the line. In 1947 and 1948 the line finally saw the arrival of more modern diesel-electric locomotives for freight hauling, but their use was very short lived. In 1949, the gandy dancers who had maintained the line pulled up the rails and ties as part of the abandonment.

=== The route ===
The Shepaug was renowned for its labyrinthine route. It was said that the line took 32 miles (51 km) of track to travel a distance of only 18 miles (29 km) as the crow flies. A 235 ft (72 m) curved tunnel was cut through rock southwest of Washington Depot that still exists along a hiking trail. There were reputed to be 192 curves along the line from Litchfield to Hawleyville, about six per mile.

A 428 ft (130 m) Brown truss type bridge carried the rails over the Housatonic River between the village of Shepaug and Hawleyville. Other smaller bridges over the Shepaug River were of the box truss type.

In 1889, a branch of the line from New Preston was planned four miles (6.4 km) to Lake Wauramaug. This line would have carried vacationing passengers in the summer time and also helped to distribute ice from icehouses throughout the year.

In 1892, the NYNH&H leased the Hawleyville-Bethel branch to the Shepaug.

Stations and flag stops along the line from northeast to southwest with distances from Hawleyville included:

Stop	Distance	Comment
Litchfield	38 mi (61 km)	Northeastern terminus and headquarters of the railroad
Bantam	33 mi (53 km)	The nearby lake supplied ice to urban markets in the days before refrigeration.
Morris	32 mi (51 km)	This location was also known as "Smoke Hollow".
Romford		Site of station is now a soccer field for the Rumsey Hall School which relocated here in 1949.
New Preston		Stop serving Lake Wauramaug
Washington	24 mi (39 km)	The station was in the Washington Depot village in the Shepaug River valley.
Valley Station		Whistle stop for Holiday House (1893-1918)
Judd's Bridge	22 mi (35 km)	
Roxbury	18 mi (29 km)	
Roxbury Falls		Home of the Silicon Mills (quartzite powder factory) until it burned in 1908.
Shepaug		The small lean-to building was more of a whistle stop.
Hawleyville	0 mi	Interchange with the Housatonic to Danbury, Bridgeport, and Pittsfield; D&N to Bethel

== The Steep Rock Association land trust ==
In 1889 architect Ehrick Rossiter (1854-1941), an 1871 graduate of The Gunnery in Washington, Connecticut, purchased 100 acres (40 ha) along the Shepaug River to save it from logging. The area included several miles of SL&N tracks. In 1893 philanthropists Edward I. and Mary Lawrence McLane Van Ingen built Holiday House south of Washington Depot following plans drawn up by Rossiter. Holiday House served as a country hotel or retreat for young working women from New York City. It was a non sectarian effort run by St. Bartholomew's Episcopal Church, New York (then on 42nd street). Although Holiday House stopped operating as a retreat by 1918 and was torn down shortly thereafter, vestiges of it including stone walkways and stone foundations for a pedestrian suspension bridge that allowed train passengers to disembark and make their way to the retreat still stand in the Steep Rock reservation. In 1925 Rossiter donated his land to a group of trustees so that it could be preserved in its wooded state. In 1929 the Steep Rock Association trustees purchased the rounded oxbow encircled hill known as the Clam Shell and added it to the preserve. The floods of 1955 removed the remnants of the SL&N bridge over the river near the Clam Shell. Over the years additional land in separate parcels was donated to the trust and it currently conserves more than 2,700 acres (1,100 ha). Several kilometers of former SL&N track right of way form hiking and bridle trails within the Steep Rock Association preserves today.
