= Hawleyville, Connecticut =

Unincorporated community in Connecticut, United States

- Census-designated place
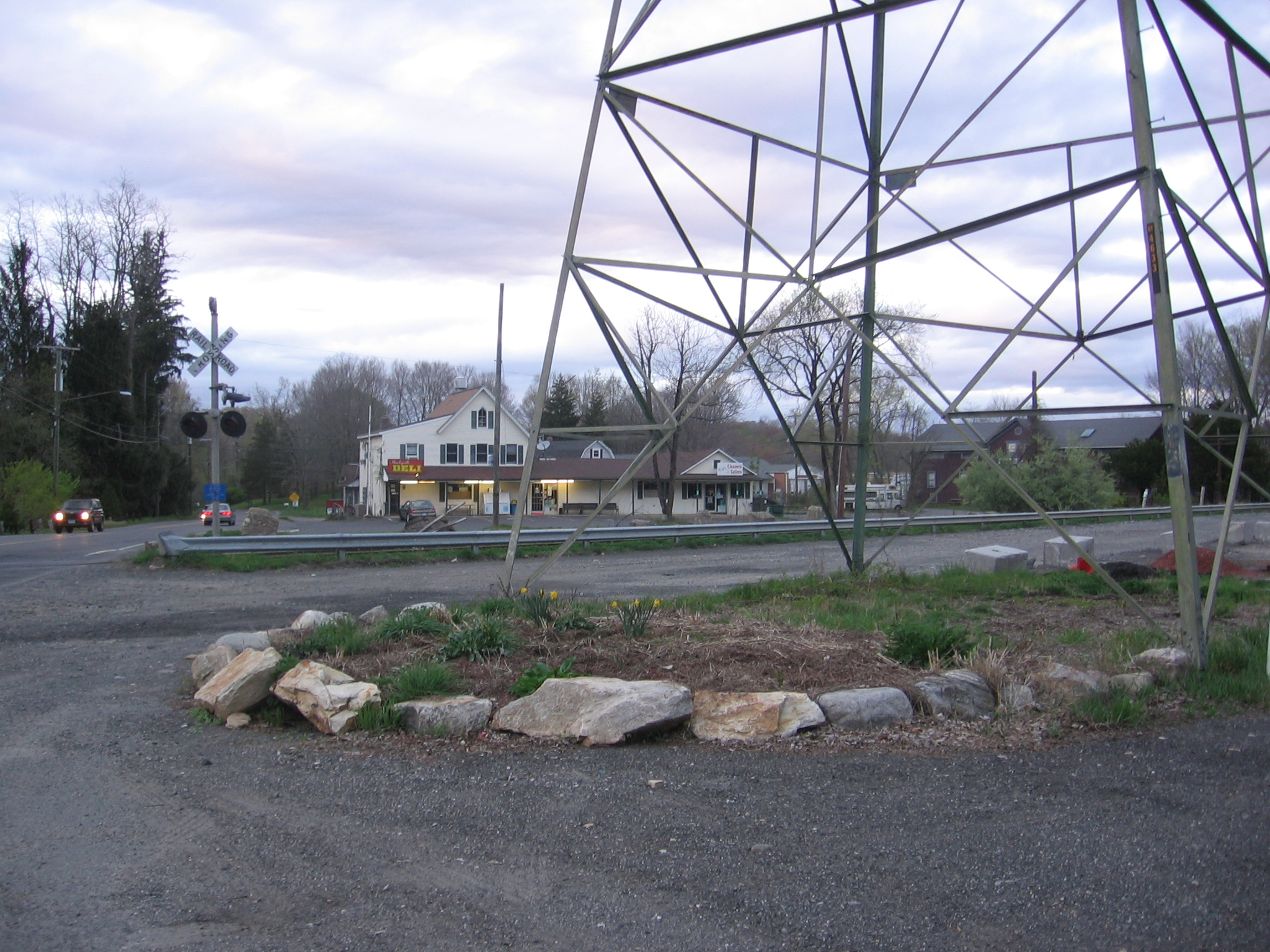
- The Hawleyville Deli lies along Route 25 where it crosses the Housatonic Railroad.

- Location within the Western Connecticut Planning Region and the state of Connecticut

- Location within Connecticut Location within the United States
- Coordinates: 41°25′33″N 73°21′20″W
- Country: United States
- U.S. state: Connecticut
- County: Fairfield
- Metropolitan area: Bridgeport-Stamford
- Town: Newtown
- Time zone: UTC−5 (Eastern)
  - Summer (DST): UTC−4 (EDT)
- ZIP code: 06440-9992
- Area codes: 203/475

Hawleyville is an unincorporated community in Fairfield County in the town of Newtown, Connecticut, United States, approximately one mile outside the borough of Newtown. As of the 2020 census, Hawleyville had a population of 151. It was listed as a census-designated place prior to the 2020 census.

== History ==
Hawleyville is named after the family of Glover Hawley. This was a condition Hawley included in the sale of land to the Housatonic Railroad Company in the nineteenth century. Hawleyville briefly emerged as a railroad center, causing Newtown's population to grow to over 4,000 circa 1881. The railroads included the New York and New England Railroad and the Hawleyville Branch of the Danbury and Norwalk Railroad. As of 2018, the Housatonic Railroad Company owns a lumber distribution and bulk transfer facility in Hawleyville.

Hawleyville gained a sewer system in 2001, which was subsequently expanded upon in 2016. It utilizes the nearby Danbury sewage plant.

== Emergency services ==
The area is served by Hawleyville Volunteer Fire and Rescue.
