= New York and New Haven Railroad =

Defunct railroad in Connecticut and New York

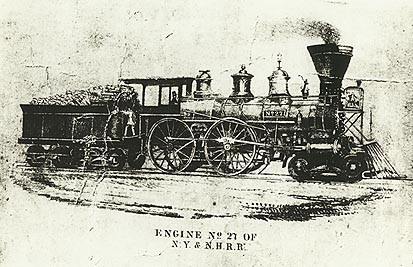
- Locomotive number 27 of the New York and New Haven Railroad in 1860

Overview
- Operator: Metro-North Railroad Amtrak; CT Rail (limited service); CSX Transportation (freight) Providence and Worcester Railroad (overhead freight rights)
- Locale: New York; Connecticut
- Dates of operation: 1849–1872
- Successor: New York, New Haven and Hartford Railroad

Technical
- Track gauge: 4 ft 8 1/2 in (1,435 mm) standard gauge

The New York and New Haven Railroad (NY&NH) was a railroad connecting New York City to New Haven, Connecticut, along the shore of Long Island Sound. It opened in 1849, and in 1872 it merged with the Hartford & New Haven Railroad to form the New York, New Haven & Hartford Railroad. The line is now the Metro-North Railroad New Haven Line and part of Amtrak's Northeast Corridor.

== History ==
=== Background and formation ===
In the early days of railroads, building a line along the north shore of the Long Island Sound was considered difficult due to the many rivers that fed into it. The first all-rail New York City-Boston lines ran north via the predecessors to the New York Central and Boston & Albany (B&A) railroads. Other routes involved combined water and rail routes, some going east via the Long Island Rail Road, other departing the East River waterfront of New York for ports in Connecticut, Rhode Island, or Massachusetts. However, railroad technology soon improved, and the NY&NH was chartered June 20, 1844, to build such a line from New York to New Haven, where it would connect to the Hartford & New Haven Railroad, which itself connected to the future B&A at Springfield.

1845 map of surveyed route

Construction began September 1847 and the first train operated by January 1849. A March 17, 1848, agreement gave the NY&NH trackage rights over the New York & Harlem Railroad from Woodlawn (now part of the Bronx) south into New York City.

=== Operations ===
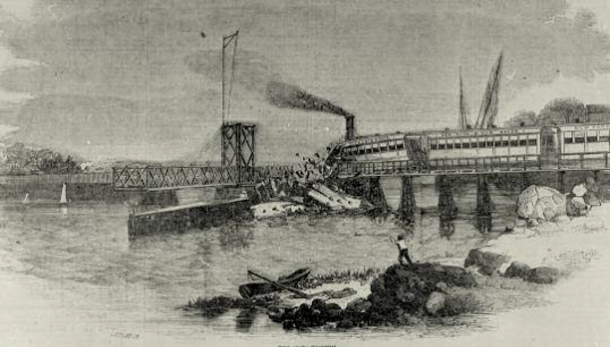
A wreck on the New York and New Haven at South Norwalk, Connecticut, in 1853

On July 11, 1848, the NY&NH leased the recently opened New Haven and Northampton Railroad (also known as the Canal Line), running north from New Haven to Plainville. On February 16, 1850, a recently opened continuation of the line to Granby was also leased; further extensions northward into Massachusetts were later acquired by the New Haven and Northampton as well. The New York and New Haven's lease of the New Haven and Northampton expired June 30, 1869, and was not renewed, and the latter returned to independent operations; the Canal Line ultimately outlasted the New York and New Haven.

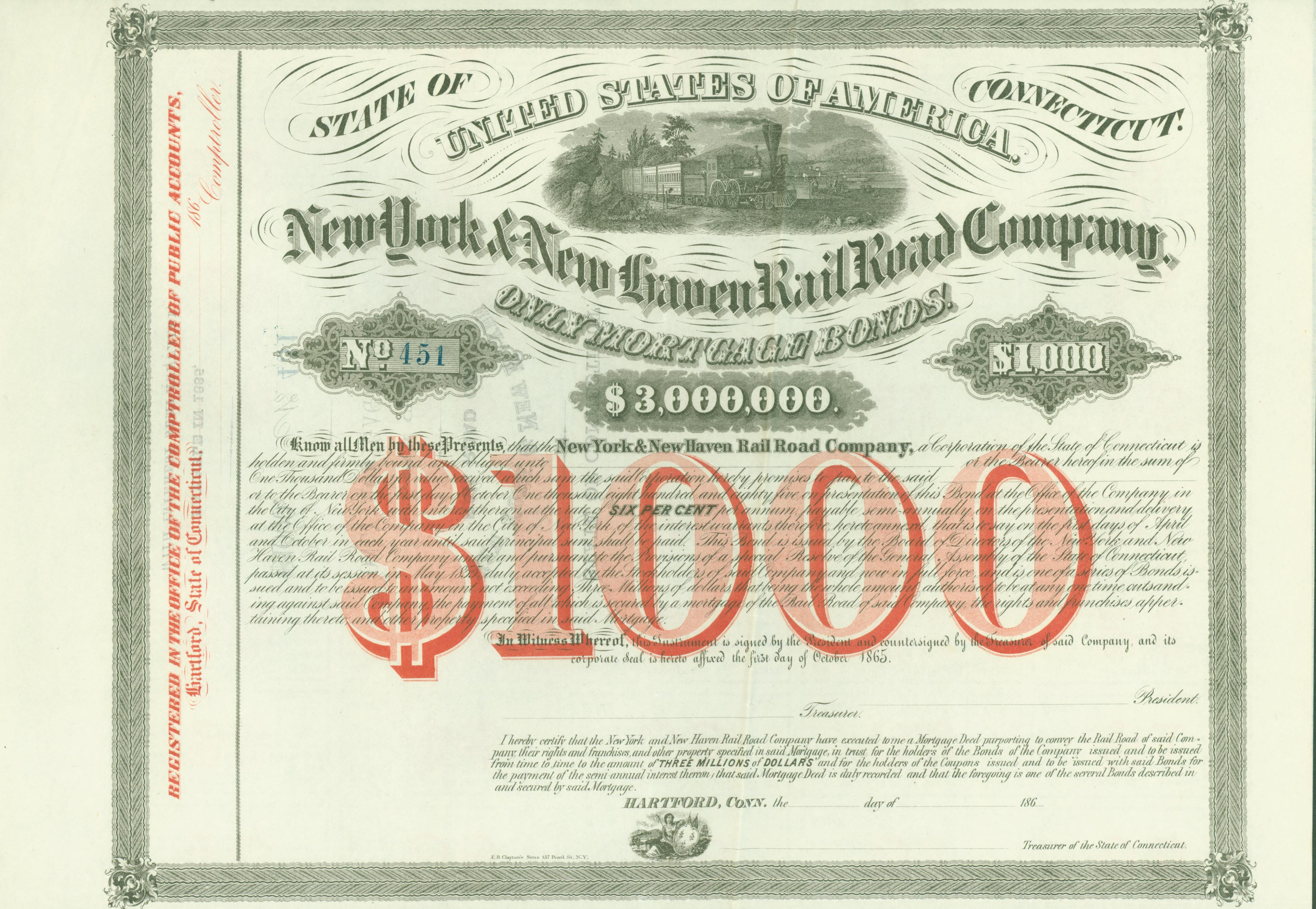
Unissued bond of the New York & New Haven Rail Road Company

The first superintendent of the railroad was R.B. Mason. He was succeeded by George W. Whistler Jr. In 1854, James Henry Hoyt of Stamford, Connecticut, became the third superintendent. When the railroad's first track was built in the 1840s, Hoyt had been a contractor grading portions of it, building bridges, and supplying ties. He then supplied the railroad with fuel and was again a heavy contractor when the second track was built.

The eastern half of the north shore line, from New Haven east to New London, was chartered in 1848 as the New Haven & New London Railroad, opening in 1852. In 1856 it was consolidated with the unbuilt New London and Stonington Railroad to form the New Haven, New London & Stonington Railroad, which was leased by the New York, Providence & Boston Railroad (NYP&B) in 1859. The line east to Stonington was never built and the company was reorganized as the Shore Line Railway in 1865. The NY&NH leased it on November 1, 1870, as an eastern extension of its line.

On September 7, 1870, the NY&NH and Hartford & New Haven agreed to consolidate into one continuous line from New York to Springfield, Massachusetts. This merger happened on July 24, 1872, forming the New York, New Haven and Hartford Railroad.

=== Successors ===
The line has since passed into Penn Central, Conrail and is now mostly part of Amtrak's Northeast Corridor, with additional passenger service provided by Metro-North Railroad. The state of Connecticut currently owns the line from New Haven to the New York border, and Metro-North controls the line from New Rochelle to New York City. Just as in 1849, the line merges with the current Harlem Line in the Bronx to access Grand Central Terminal.

== See also ==
- List of New York, New Haven and Hartford Railroad precursors
