= Shore Line Railway (Connecticut) =

Railway line in Connecticut, USA

- Map of the Shore Line Railway
- 1860 map of the combined "Shore Line Rail Road" route between New York City and Boston

Overview
- Locale: Southern Connecticut
- Dates of operation: 1852–

Technical
- Track gauge: 4 ft 8 1/2 in (1,435 mm) standard gauge

The Shore Line Railway was a part of the New York, New Haven and Hartford Railroad system, running east from New Haven, Connecticut, to New London along the north shore of Long Island Sound. A segment is currently used for commuter service on CT Rail's Shore Line East and regional/express service on Amtrak's high-speed Northeast Corridor.

== History ==
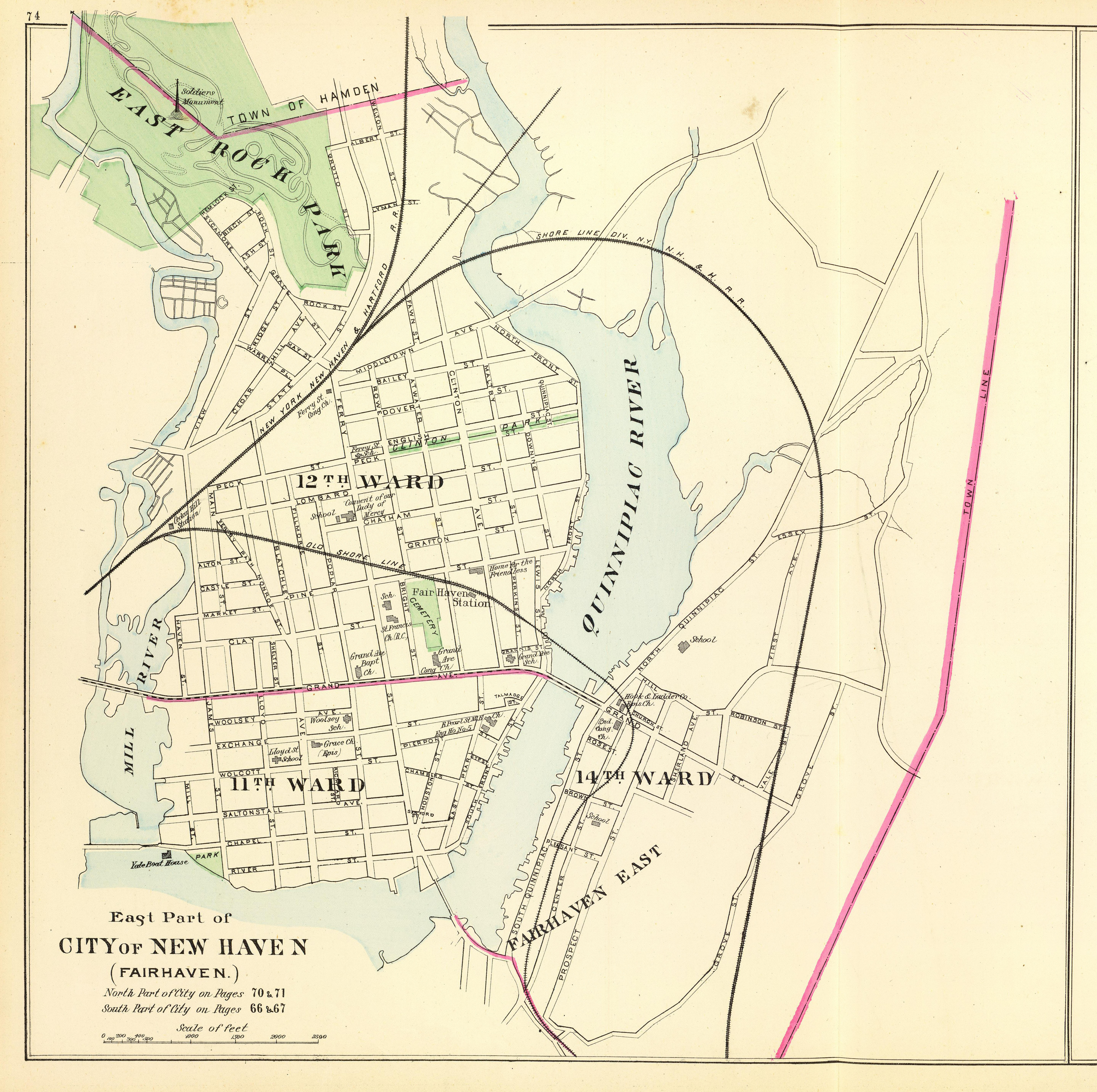
1893 map showing the old and new alignments near New Haven

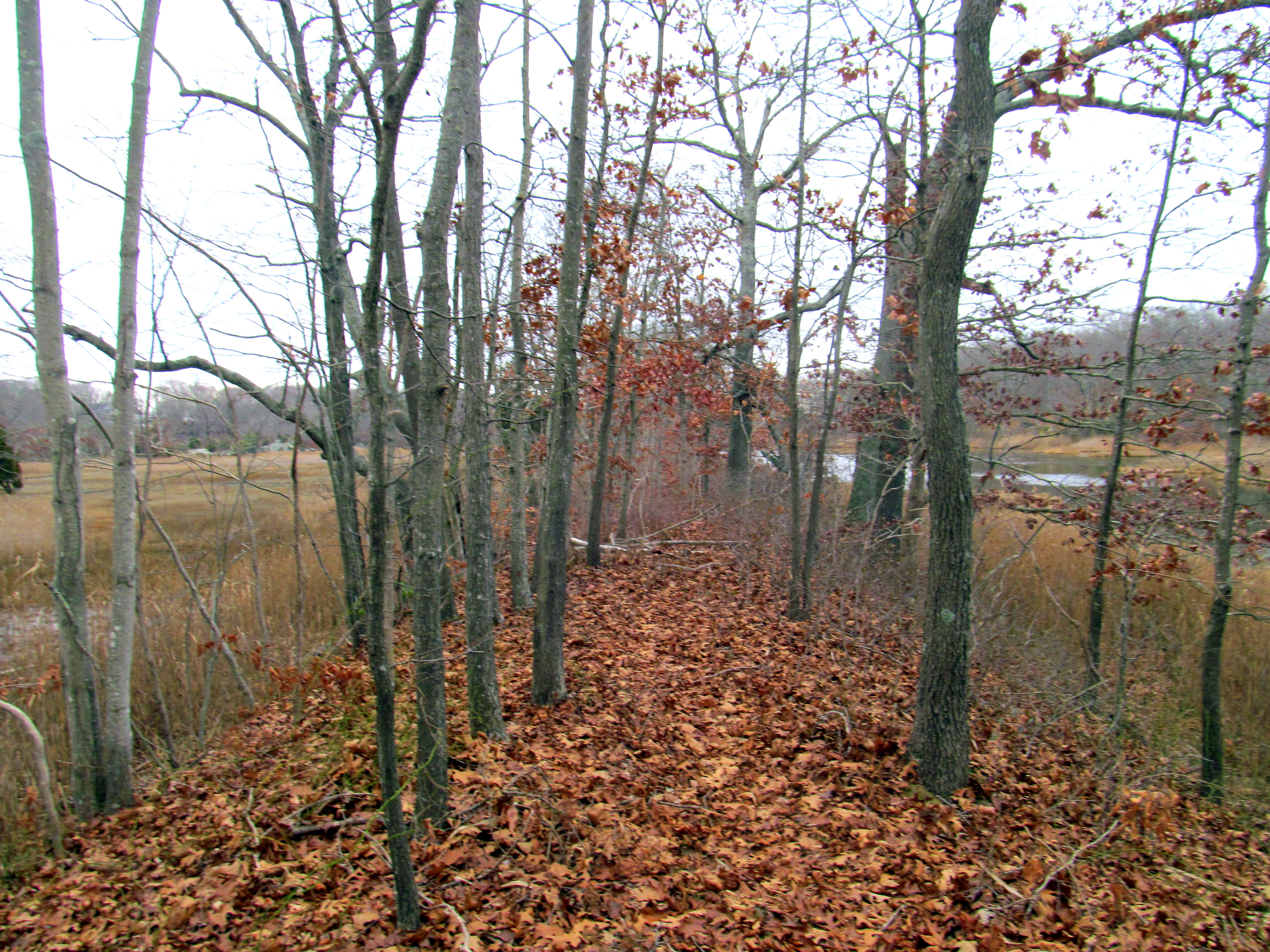
Former NH&NL embankment in Branford, Connecticut, which was replaced by a realignment project in 1893

The New Haven and New London Railroad was chartered May 1848 to build a line from New Haven, the east end of the New York and New Haven Railroad, east to New London on the Thames River and the south end of the New London, Willimantic and Palmer Railroad. Construction began in 1850 and the line opened from New Haven to the Connecticut River in Old Saybrook on July 1, 1852. Later that month the rest of the line opened, from the other side of the river in Old Lyme east to New London; a train ferry took trains across the river.

The New London and Stonington Railroad was chartered May 1852 to continue east from New London to Stonington, the west end of the existing New York, Providence and Boston Railroad. On March 6, 1857 the New Haven and New London merged with the New London and Stonington to form the New Haven, New London and Stonington Railroad. The line west from Stonington opened December 30, 1858, ending at Groton, with another car ferry across the Thames River to New London. This completed the "Shore Line" route between New York City and Boston; through passenger service began December 12, 1859, with night trains first running August 19, 1861 and sleeping cars November 11.

On November 1, 1859 the New York, Providence and Boston Railroad leased the NHNL&S, giving it a line from Providence, Rhode Island, to New Haven. In 1864 the NYP&B bought the part east of New London, and the rest was reorganized as the Shore Line Railway. The New York and New Haven Railroad (which became part of the New York, New Haven and Hartford Railroad in 1872) leased it on November 1, 1870. (The NYNH&H acquired the NYP&B in 1892.) Soon after, a bridge was built over the Connecticut River, and in 1889 a bridge opened over the Thames River, directly connecting the end in New London with the NYP&B in Groton.

In the early 1890s the line was double-tracked, and some areas had new straighter alignments built. Most prominent was in eastern New Haven and East Haven, where the old alignment took it across many streets at-grade. The new line ran further east, requiring a tunnel to pass under the hills to merge with the NYNH&H main line at Air Line Junction, also the junction with the Boston and New York Air-Line Railroad. Other realignments include a section in Branford, where the old alignment is still partially in use to access the Branford Steam Railroad, as well as smaller sections in Old Lyme and just east of Rocky Neck State Park in Niantic.

The Shore Line Railway was merged into the New York, New Haven and Hartford Railroad on March 17, 1897, becoming its Shore Line Division. In 1969 the New Haven merged into Penn Central, and then at the latest the Shore Line was extended along the whole New York City-Boston route. In 1976, Penn Central merged into Conrail, and Amtrak bought much of the Shore Line, now known as the Northeast Corridor, including the former Shore Line Railway. Shore Line East now provides commuter rail service between New Haven and New London, connecting at New Haven to Metro-North's New Haven Line for continuing service to New York City.

== See also ==
- List of New York, New Haven and Hartford Railroad precursors
