= Botsford, Connecticut =

Village in Newtown, Connecticut, United States

- Census-designated place
- Village of Botsford
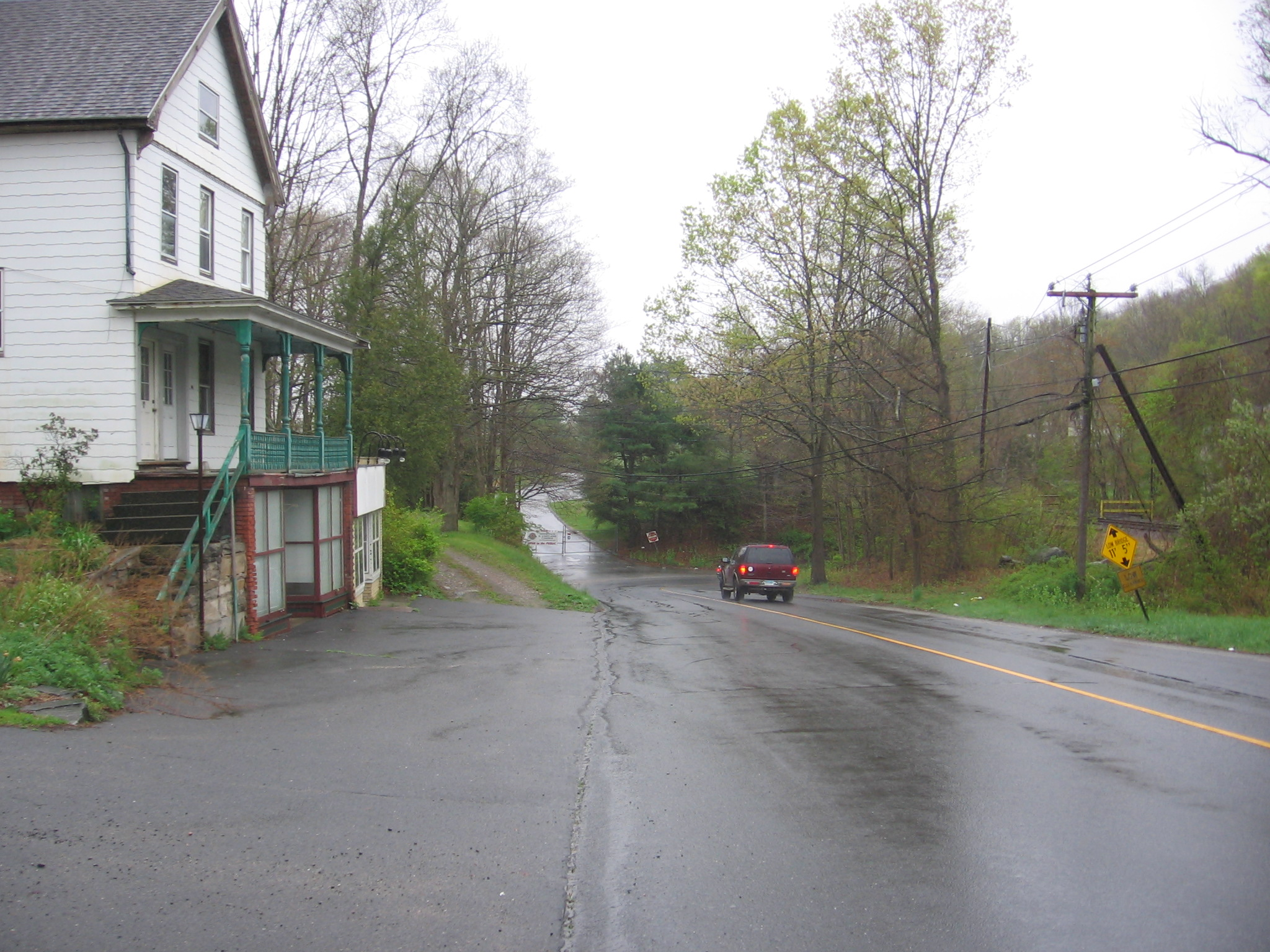
- Botsford on a rainy afternoon, April 22, 2012

- Location within the Western Connecticut Planning Region and the state of Connecticut

- Location within Connecticut Location within the United States
- Coordinates: 41°21′59″N 73°15′25″W
- Country: United States
- State: Connecticut
- County: Fairfield
- City: Newtown
- Time zone: UTC-5:00 (Eastern)
  - Summer (DST): UTC-4:00 (Eastern)
- ZIP Code: 06404
- Area codes: 203/475

Botsford is a village of Newtown in Fairfield County, Connecticut, United States. As of the 2020 census, Botsford had a population of 499. The town of Newtown has one political body, but consists of multiple geographic subdivisions. It currently contains a fire department and post office. CT 25 runs along the western part of the village. Botsford was listed as a census-designated place prior to the 2020 census.

Robert Winkler, naturalist and author of Going Wild: Adventures with Birds in the Suburban Wilderness, is a resident.

The Connecticut Green Industries Council, a partner of UConn in the NextGenCT project is headquartered in town. The council also routinely testifies on agricultural and certain local matters to the Connecticut General Assembly.
