= Housatonic Railroad =

Railroad operating in New England, U.S.

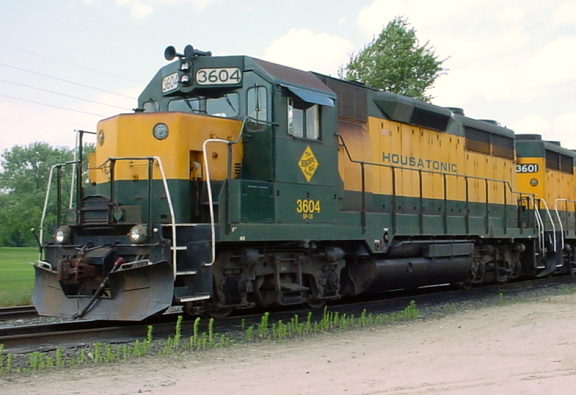
- Housatonic Railroad locomotives in Canaan, Connecticut

Overview
- Headquarters: Canaan, Connecticut
- Reporting mark: HRRC
- Locale: Connecticut; Massachusetts; New York
- Dates of operation: 1840–present

Technical
- Track gauge: 4 ft 8 1/2 in (1,435 mm) standard gauge
- Length: 161 mi (259 km)

Other
- Website: www.hrrc.com

The Housatonic Railroad (/ˌhuːsəˈtɒnɪk/ HOOS-ə-TON-ik; reporting mark HRRC) is a Class III railroad operating in southwestern New England and eastern New York. It was chartered in 1983 to operate a short section of ex-New York, New Haven and Hartford Railroad in northwestern Connecticut, and has since expanded north and south, as well as west into New York State.

The Housatonic Railroad was also a company chartered in 1836 and leased by the New Haven in 1892. It followed much the same route as the current company, but did not run west into New York.

== History ==
=== Regional railroad: 1836–1898 ===
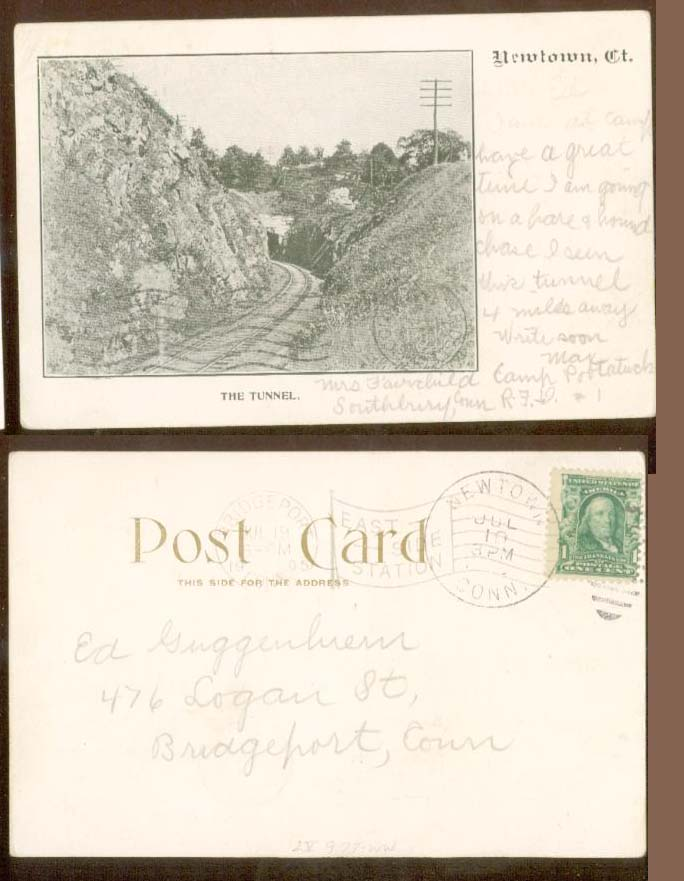
Railroad tunnel which still exists, unused, in Newtown, Connecticut, as pictured in a postcard sent in 1905

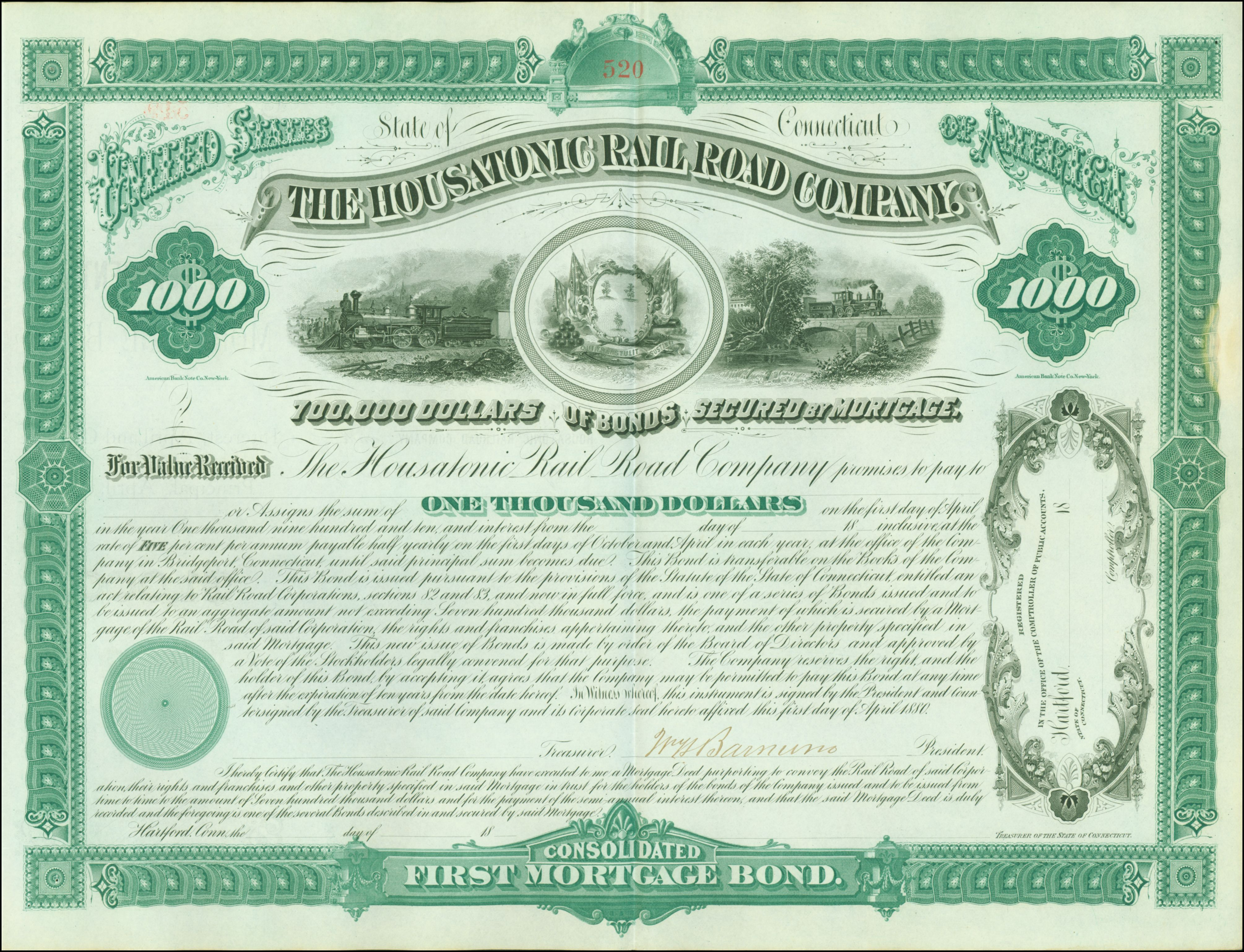
Mortgage Bond of the Housatonic Railroad Co., issued 1. April 1880

The Housatonic Railroad, originally (mis)spelled as 'Ousatonic Railroad', was chartered in May 1836 to build a line from Bridgeport, Connecticut, north to the Massachusetts state line, along the Housatonic River valley. On February 19, 1840, regular service began from Bridgeport to New Milford, and on December 1, 1842, it opened to the state line.

On the other side of the line, the Berkshire Railroad was incorporated April 13, 1837, to continue the line north to West Stockbridge, where it would connect to the West Stockbridge Railroad (see below) and the never-built Lee and Hudson Railroad. Construction began in February 1841, and it was completed on December 1, 1842, the same day the line in Connecticut opened. The Housatonic Railroad leased the Berkshire Railroad on January 1, 1843.

The West Stockbridge Railroad was chartered in 1831 and incorporated April 5, 1836 to run from West Stockbridge west to State Line, where it would continue to the Hudson River in New York State as the Hudson and Berkshire Railroad. The line opened on August 10, 1838. On February 6, 1844, the Berkshire Railroad (then leased to the Housatonic) leased the West Stockbridge and Hudson and Berkshire Railroads. On November 21, 1854, the Western Railroad bought the Hudson and Berkshire, which became a branch from the Western's line (later the Boston and Albany Railroad) from Chatham to Hudson, and was abandoned east of Hudson. The West Stockbridge Railroad stayed part of the Housatonic system.

The final section of main line was incorporated March 20, 1847, as the Stockbridge and Pittsfield Railroad. This line split from the original main line at Van Deusenville in Great Barrington and ran east and north to Pittsfield. The full line opened on January 1, 1850, under operation of the Housatonic, and was formally leased January 25.

For a time the Housatonic operated the Pittsfield and North Adams Railroad, running north from the Western Railroad east of Pittsfield to North Adams, but it was returned to the Boston and Albany Railroad, the successor to the Western, in the early 1870s.

The Danbury and Norwalk Railroad opened in 1852 from Danbury south to Norwalk. The New York, Housatonic and Northern Railroad was chartered in 1863 to run from White Plains, New York, northeast via Danbury to Brookfield, Connecticut, on the Housatonic. It was only built north of Danbury, and on May 1, 1874, the Housatonic leased and opened it. On May 6, 1881, the Housatonic outright bought it, and on July 27, 1887, the Housatonic leased the Danbury and Norwalk, by then including branches to Ridgefield and Hawleyville (the latter on the Housatonic's main line) and a southern extension to Wilson Point.

In the meantime, the New Haven and Derby Railroad was chartered in 1864 to run from New Haven west to Derby, Connecticut, and north to Ansonia, planned as part of the route over the never-built Hudson Highland Suspension Bridge. It opened in 1871. On November 14, 1888, a 3.79-mile (6.10 km) extension from Derby Junction to a point in Shelton was opened. The rest of the extension, 9.79 mi (15.76 km) from that point to the Housatonic Railroad at Botsford, was built by the Housatonic and opened on November 28. On July 9, 1889, the Housatonic leased the New Haven and Derby.

On July 1, 1892, the New York, New Haven and Hartford Railroad leased the Housatonic, forming the Berkshire Division; it was merged on March 29, 1898.

=== New Haven's Berkshire Division: 1892–1969 ===
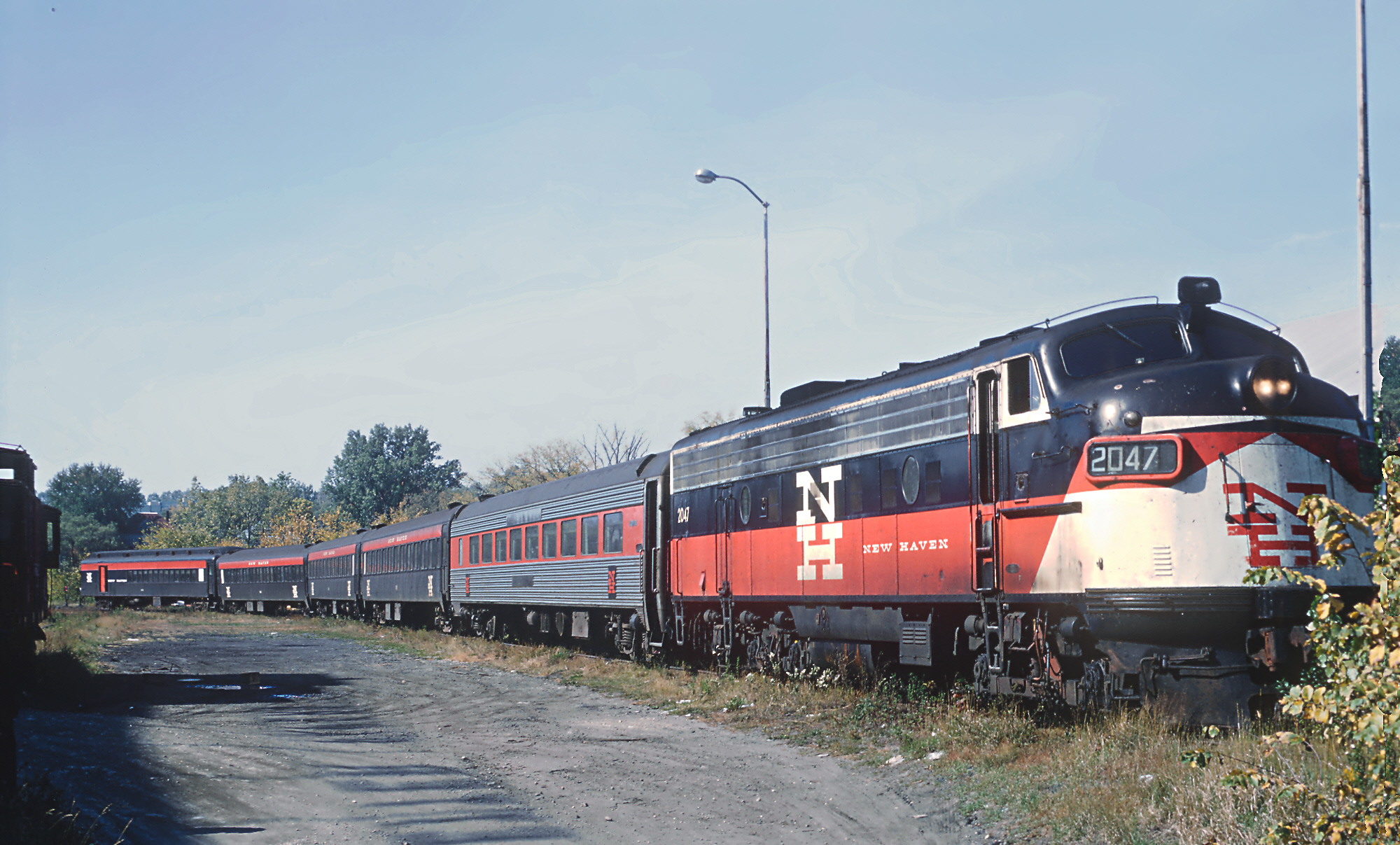
Weekend New York-Pittsfield train on the New Haven's Berkshire Division, October 13, 1968

By the end of the New Haven's life, the Housatonic's original main line had been abandoned south of Botsford, where the old New Haven branch ran only east to Derby. The main line was also gone between Brookfield and Hawleyville, with traffic using the branch to Danbury and old New York and New England Railroad. The Danbury and Norwalk was still in use, but most branches, including the original main line to State Line, Massachusetts, were gone.

On January 1, 1969 the New Haven was merged into Penn Central, which named the lines as follows:

- Pittsfield Branch: Berkshire Junction near Danbury north to Pittsfield
- Maybrook Branch: Derby Junction west via Danbury and other New Haven lines to Campbell Hall, New York
- Danbury Branch: Danbury and Norwalk Railroad

=== Penn Central and Conrail: 1969–1983 ===
The last passenger train ran over the route on April 30, 1971, the day before Amtrak took over Penn Central's passenger operations. At that time, the travel time from Danbury to Pittsfield required two hours and 45 minutes. By 1974 the middle section was abandoned, between Boardman Bridge in New Milford and Canaan, Connecticut, and was not made part of Conrail on April 1, 1976, instead being bought by the State of Connecticut. In 1982 the Boston and Maine Railroad bought the line north of Canaan, renaming it the Canaan Running Track. Conrail continued to operate the line south of New Milford, and the old Danbury and Norwalk Railroad was conveyed to the Metro-North Commuter Railroad on January 1, 1983, becoming their Danbury Branch.

== The New Housatonic Railroad (1983–present) ==
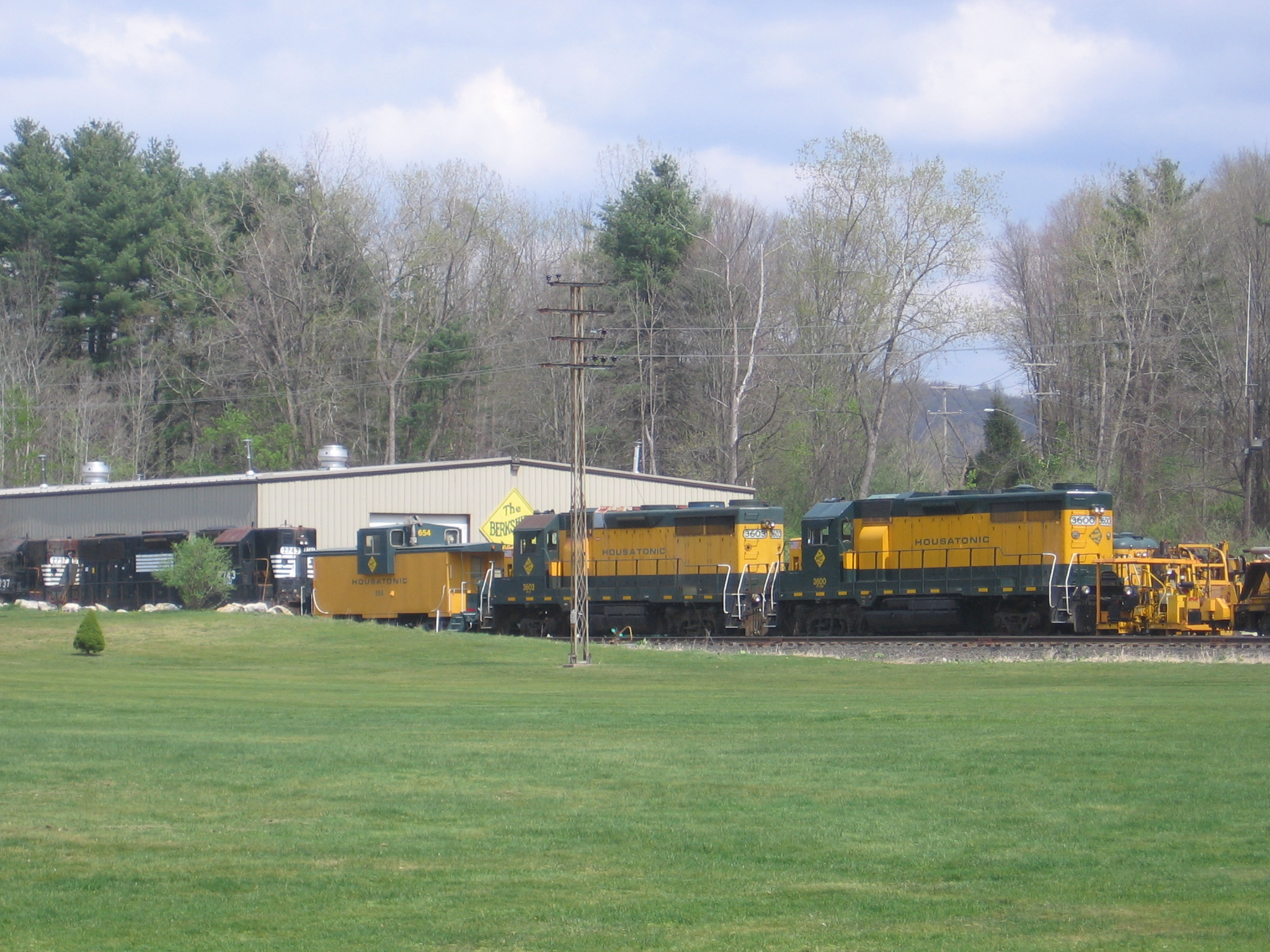
The Housatonic Railroad headquarters in Canaan, Connecticut

A new Housatonic Railroad was chartered in 1983 by John Hanlon Jr. to lease 34 miles of the former line, from Boardman Bridge in New Milford north to Canaan, Connecticut, from the State of Connecticut. Excursion trains began operating between Canaan and just south of Cornwall Bridge (at Belsprings Siding) in November 1984. The rest of the line, south into New Milford, was made serviceable in 1989, giving the company two connections - the Boston and Maine Railroad (Guilford Rail System) in Canaan and Conrail in New Milford. In April the Housatonic began to serve Becton, Dickinson and Company, a plastics plant in Canaan, but almost immediately the line was severed at Falls Village by a washout, not repaired until 14 months later.

=== Expansion into Massachusetts and New York ===
The Housatonic Transportation Company was incorporated in Delaware on January 2, 1991 as a holding company for the railroad's properties, including the newly formed Danbury Terminal Railroad (reporting mark DTRR) (an operating company) and Maybrook Properties (a land-owning company). That month the Housatonic bought the connecting Guilford trackage (Canaan Running Track) north to Pittsfield, Massachusetts, where it obtained another interchange with Conrail.

In December 1992, the Danbury Terminal Railroad acquired trackage and rights belonging to Conrail in southwestern Connecticut and southeastern New York. Maybrook Properties bought the former New Haven line (then the Danbury Secondary Track) from Beacon, New York (MP 0.0), east to Hopewell Junction (MP 12.8) (former Newburgh, Dutchess and Connecticut Railroad), Hopewell Junction (MP 42.9) east to Derby, Connecticut (MP 104.8), (former Hartford, Providence and Fishkill Railroad, Housatonic Railroad and branch to Derby). The Danbury Terminal operated this Maybrook Properties-owned trackage. The Danbury Terminal also obtained Conrail's former trackage rights to serve freight on the Metro-North Commuter Railroad's Harlem Line from White Plains (MP 22.0) to Dover Plains (MP 76.6), and north to Wassaic (MP 81.6) over trackage still owned by the New York and Harlem Railroad and leased to Conrail, crossing the east–west line at Dykemans. Finally, it obtained overhead trackage rights over Metro-North's Waterbury Branch from the east end of this line at Derby (MP 8.9) south to Devon, Connecticut (MP 0.0), (operated for freight by the Providence and Worcester Railroad). The Housatonic also acquired the final part of the main line, from New Milford south to the east–west line at Berkshire Junction near Danbury. With this acquisition, the Housatonic gained a much expanded system and several new customers. These new acquisitions were first operated January 2, 1993.

While freight customers remained on Metro-North's Harlem Line, the HRRC was not allowed to serve them directly. A few freight shipments were forwarded from Danbury by Metro-North crews, but this arrangement was only temporary until the remaining customers converted to truck transportation. On December 31, 1996, the Danbury Terminal Railroad was merged into the Housatonic Railroad.

In 1984, the Berkshire Scenic Railway Museum began operating passenger excursions between Lee and Great Barrington, over tracks owned by the Housatonic Railroad. Due to deteriorating track conditions, passenger operations were suspended in 1989. The museum successfully campaigned for state assistance funds to upgrade the tracks. The excursion trains returned in 2003, based out of the restored station in Lenox, with regular schedules to Lee and Stockbridge.

=== 2008 to present ===
In 2008 HRRC considering the possibility of resuming commercial passenger service along the entire line from Danbury to Pittsfield, and in May 2010 began a formal study of the same. The estimated cost of upgrading the railroad to support passenger trains was estimated to be between $100 million and $150 million, not including the cost of the required equipment.

In 2011, the Housatonic Railroad decided it would not renew its agreement with BSRM to continue operating passenger excursions over their railroad. Colin Pease, spokesperson for HRRC, said, "The Housatonic Railroad has determined that the continued operation of the Berkshire Scenic Railway on Housatonic-owned tracks is no longer possible."

In July 2014, Massachusetts Department of Transportation's Board of Directors authorized the purchase of 37 miles of the railroad's Berkshire Line. MassDOT's purchase is intended to extend rail services to New York City, following track improvements for passenger and freight service between Massachusetts and Connecticut. MassDOT finalized the purchase on February 5, 2015.

On October 14, 2020, a HRRC employee was fatally struck by a maintenance of way vehicle while working in North Canaan, CT, prompting an investigation by the National Transportation Safety Board.

In June 2021, Metro-North attempted to end HRRC's trackage rights over the Beacon Line in New York and abandon the line, prompting the Housatonic Railroad to file an objection.

== See also ==
- List of New York, New Haven and Hartford Railroad precursors
