= Northup Avenue Yard =

Rail yard in Providence, Rhode Island, U.S.

Coordinates: 41°51′22″N 71°24′30″W

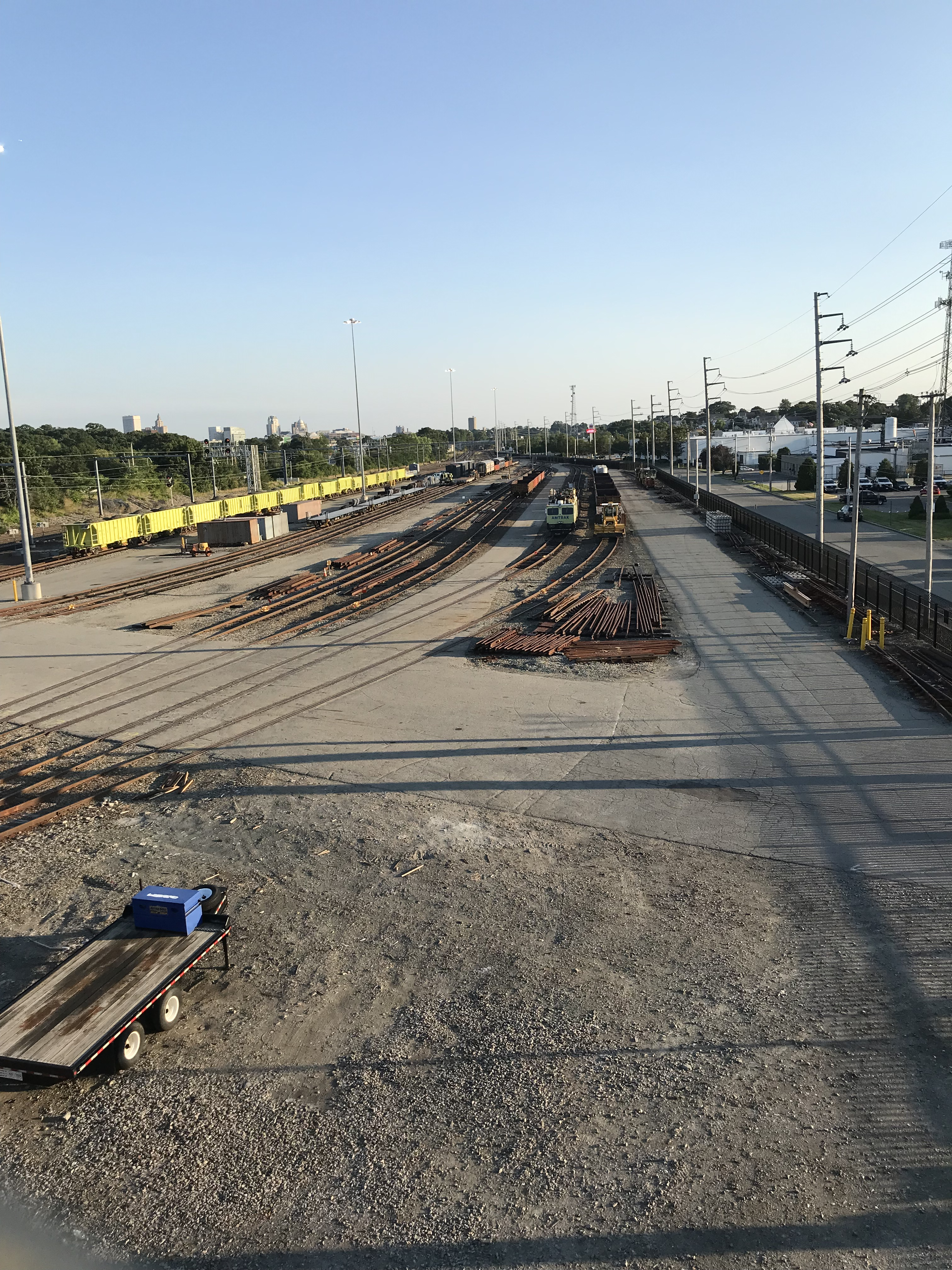
Amtrak equipment at Northup Avenue Yard

Northup Avenue Yard (also known as Northrup Avenue Yard) is a rail yard located in Providence and Pawtucket, Rhode Island, in the United States. The location has been the site of a rail yard since at least 1899. It was significantly expanded by the New York, New Haven and Hartford Railroad between 1918 and 1921 and made into a hump yard. The hump was removed around 1970, after Penn Central Transportation Company took over the New Haven in 1969. Under Penn Central, the yard was downsized and the hump removed. Conrail superseded Penn Central in 1976 and sold off the yard to the Providence and Worcester Railroad in 1982.

In the early 1980s, Amtrak established facilities at the yard to support its maintenance of way operations along the Northeast Corridor. A layover facility for MBTA Commuter Rail was constructed at the yard in 2006.

== History ==
=== Original Northup Avenue Yard ===
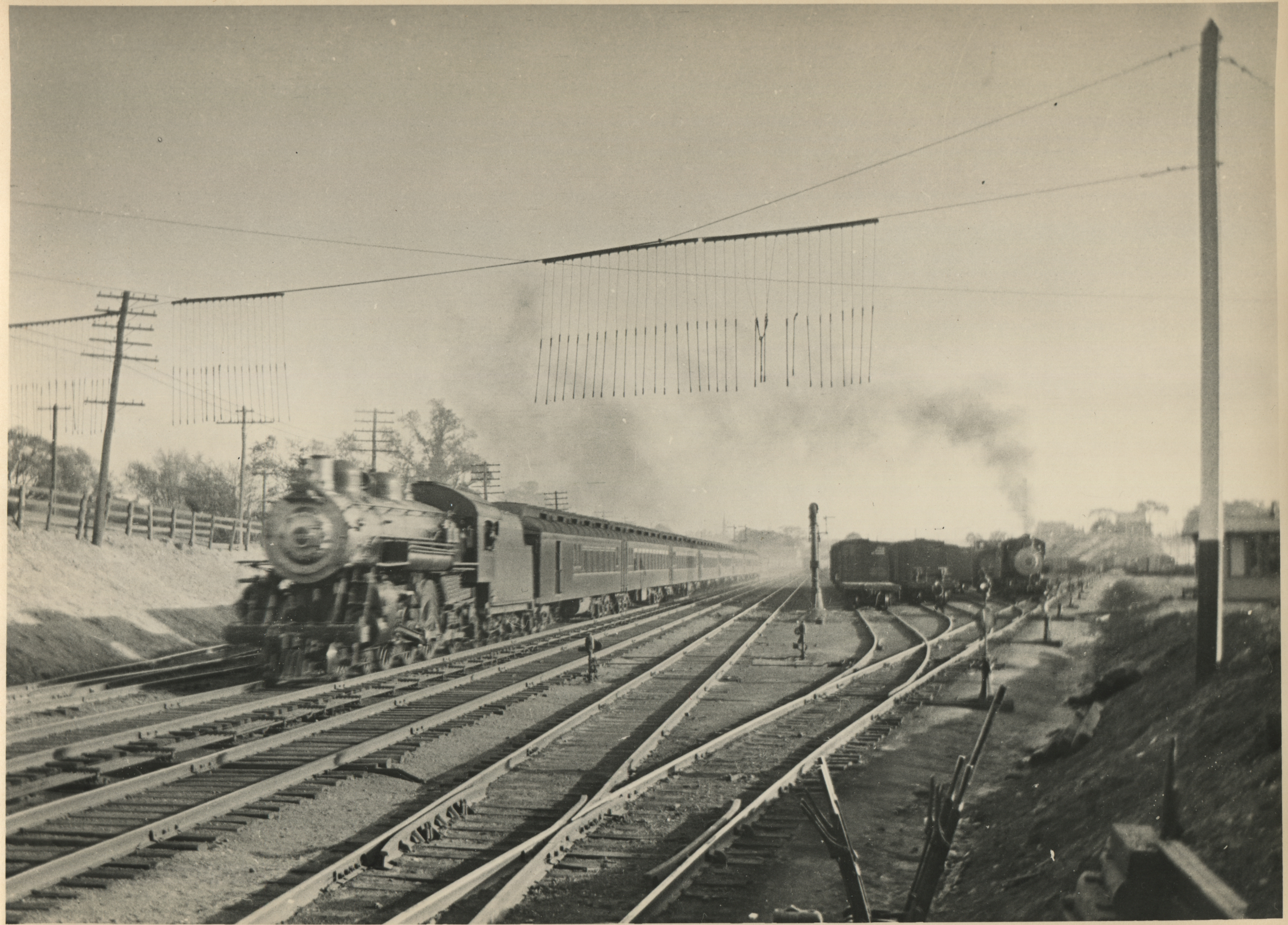
Trains at Northup Avenue Yard circa 1913

Northup Avenue Yard was originally built jointly by the Boston and Providence Railroad and Providence and Worcester Railroad. The New York, New Haven and Hartford Railroad (The New Haven) maintained a yard at Northup Avenue from at least 1899. A widening program was launched in May 1904, which increased the size of the yard to 112,000 square feet (10,400 m^{2}).

=== Design and construction ===
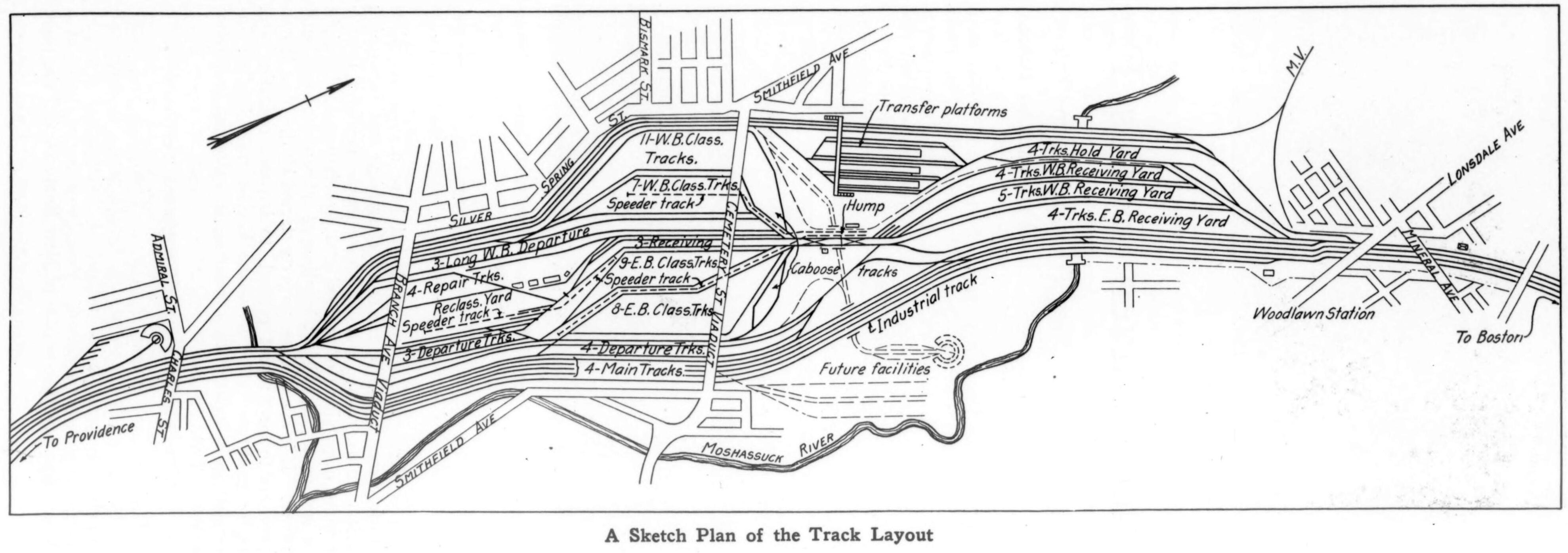
A map of Northup Avenue Yard, as built in 1920. "M.V." is the Moshassuck Valley Railroad

==== Design ====
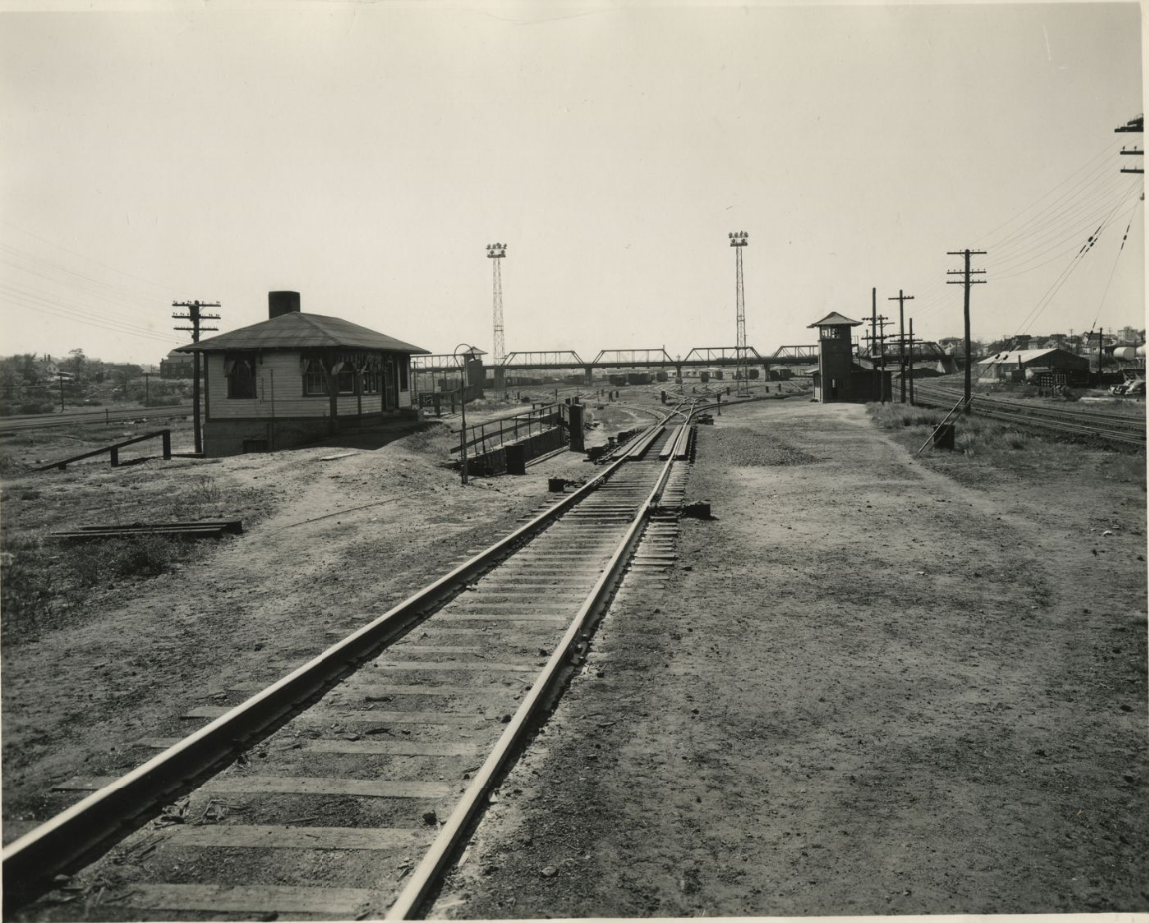
The yard's hump in 1948

A greatly enlarged Northup Avenue Yard was designed and built by the New Haven as a classification yard to sort freight trains in the Providence area. Construction was announced in 1918. The new yard's design, along with that of Cedar Hill Yard in New Haven, Connecticut, was created after a survey of recently built classification yards across the United States, to incorporate best practices. The general design of the yard was influenced by the long and narrow parcel of land the New Haven owned in Providence and Pawtucket, with 900 feet (270 m) of width available as opposed to 2 miles (3.2 km) of length. The new yard was designed as a hump yard for rapidly classifying railroad cars. Two humps were placed adjacent to one another; these were known as the 'winter' and 'summer' humps. The 'winter' hump was built several feet higher than the 'summer' hump; this extra height compensated for winter temperatures slowing the journal bearings of freight cars, as well as increased winds. If traffic warranted, both humps could be used simultaneously to increase classification speed and capacity.

==== Construction ====
To build the yard, it was necessary for the existing main line between Providence and Boston to be relocated. The original alignment of these tracks passed through the central portion of what was to be Northup Avenue Yard. As construction progress permitted, first the eastbound (towards Boston) tracks were realigned to the south, while the westbound (towards Providence) tracks received a new, temporary alignment that crossed through the north end of the yard, before ultimately being moved south with the eastbound tracks.

Northup Avenue Yard's construction relieved significant congestion within existing rail yards in Providence. Were it not built, the New Haven would instead have expanded six existing yards in Rhode Island, Massachusetts, and Connecticut.

=== Freight operations ===
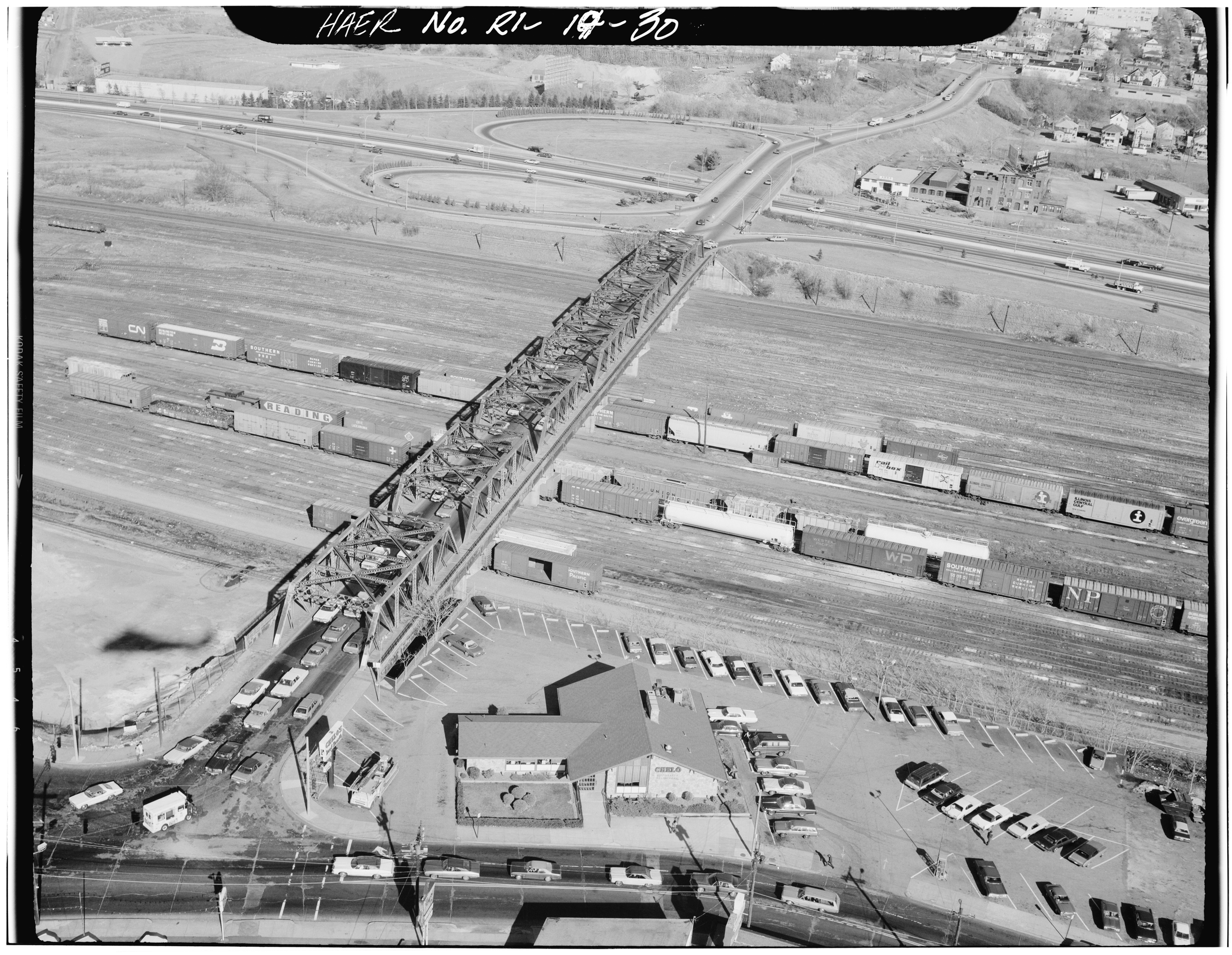
Northup Avenue Yard, circa 1970

Upon opening in 1922, Northup Avenue Yard received up to 44 freight trains per day, with a peak of five trains per hour. The two humps saw on average 2,000 railroad cars per day pass over them for classification. Two switcher locomotives operated at the yard full-time to send cars over the humps.

In 1929, the New Haven began the installation of retarders at Northup Avenue Yard, following a successful 1926 installation at Hartford Yard in Connecticut. The installation included 19 sets of retarders, plus two new control towers to operate them. As part of the project, 34 switches were also linked to the towers, enabling their remote operation by tower operators. Construction began on April 10, 1929, and the new facilities first operated on August 15 of the same year. Upon the opening of the retarders and other improvements for service, Providence newspaper The Evening Tribune described Northup Avenue Yard as "the finest in the New Haven system". The company subsequently reported in 1932 that the new retarders resulted in 35 percent less time being required to classify cars while also eliminating the need for employees to ride the cars down the hump to set their brakes manually.

The New Haven was merged into Penn Central at the end of 1968, making Penn Central the yard's new owner and operator. Around this time, the hump was removed from the yard, returning it to a flat yard with trains assembled and disassembled by switcher locomotives. Declining freight volumes had made it impossible to justify the cost of continued hump operation. When, in 1973, the Providence and Worcester Railroad (P&W) became independent of Penn Central, some operations were transferred to Framingham, Massachusetts, as the P&W became the operator of most rail service in Providence. The P&W was also given overhead rights to enter the yard to interchange with the Moshassuck Valley Railroad. Penn Central was merged into Conrail in 1976. The Providence and Worcester Railroad became the owner of the freight portion of Northup Avenue Yard, by that point Conrail's primary yard in the state of Rhode Island, on May 1, 1982.

=== Passenger use ===
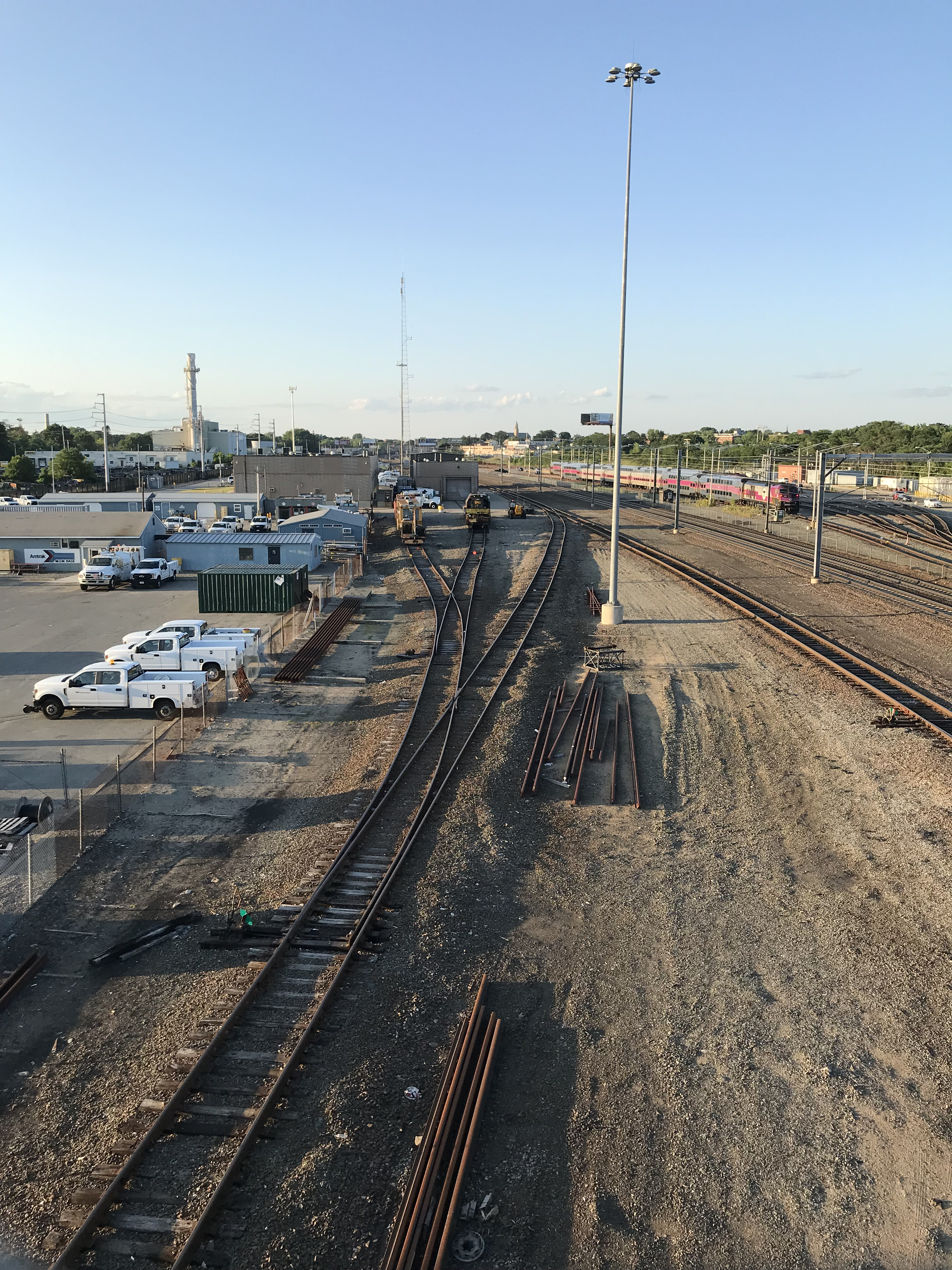
Some of Amtrak's facilities are visible on the left, along with MBTA's layover facility on the right.

Amtrak indicated interest in building a maintenance of way facility in Northup Avenue Yard in 1977. As part of the Northeast Corridor Improvement Project, the maintenance-of-way base was constructed and opened by 1982. Amtrak built a spray wash building at this site in 2006 to clean maintenance of way and work vehicles.

A six-track layover yard was built at Northup Avenue Yard in 2006 for MBTA Commuter Rail trains to be stored.
