= East Hartford Yard =

Railroad yard in East Hartford, Connecticut

Coordinates: 41.7784°N 72.6293°W

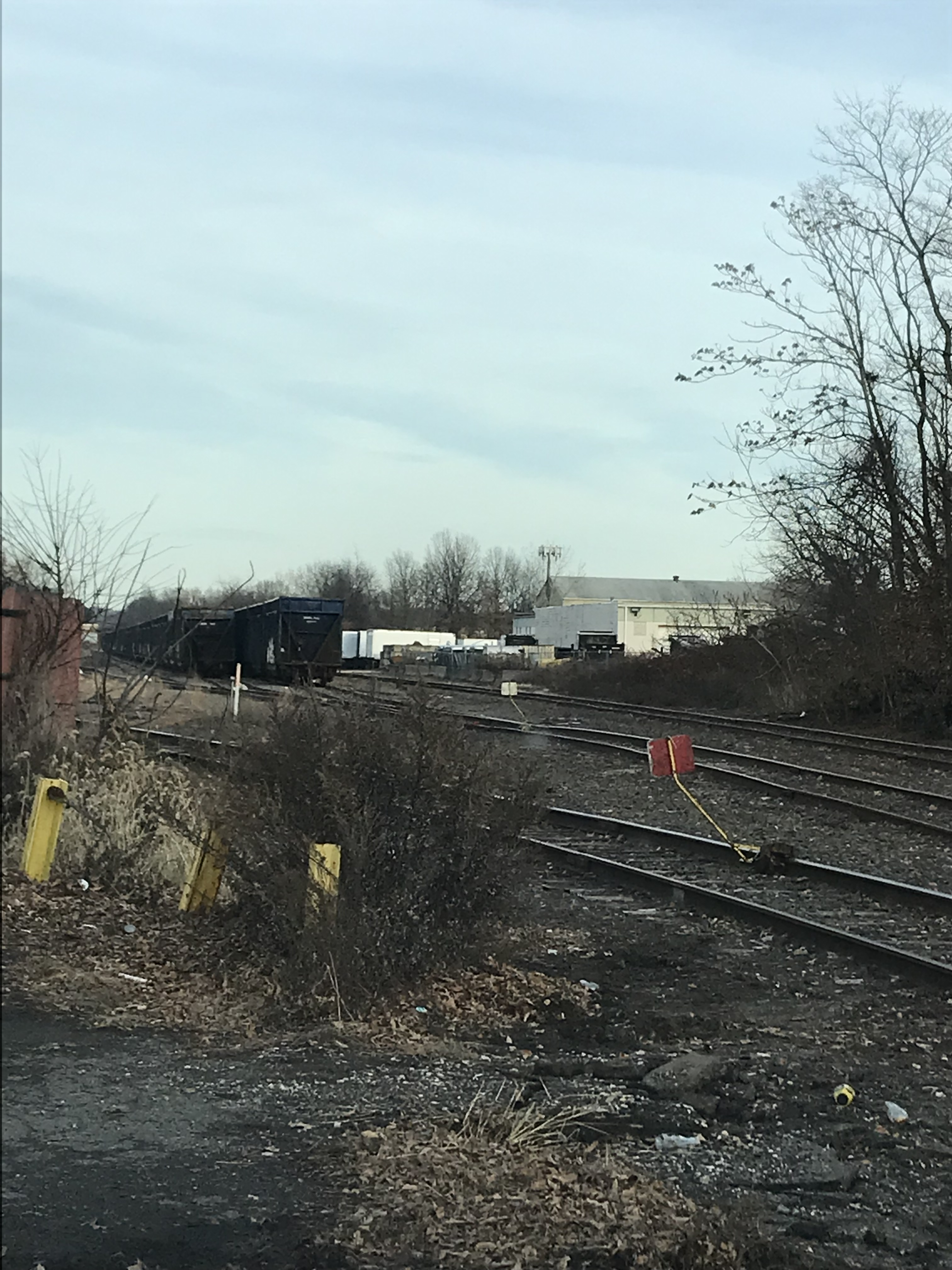
High side gondolas parked in East Hartford Yard.

East Hartford Yard is a classification yard in East Hartford, Connecticut. The yard was originally built by the New York and New England Railroad between 1881 and 1883. The opening of the yard marked the beginning of industrial development in East Hartford.

By 1906, it was the largest railroad yard in New England. That year, it was further expanded by the New York, New Haven and Hartford Railroad. The yard lost its claim to being the largest railroad yard in New England to Cedar Hill Yard in 1920.

In spite of the 1906 expansion, the yard was still struggling with congestion. As a result, the Hartford Yard was built across the Connecticut River, and connected to the East Hartford Yard.

Today, the yard is owned and operated by the Connecticut Southern Railroad, and consists of only a few tracks.
