= Cedar Hill Yard =

Railway yard in New Haven, Connecticut, US

Coordinates: 41°19′39″N 72°53′39″W

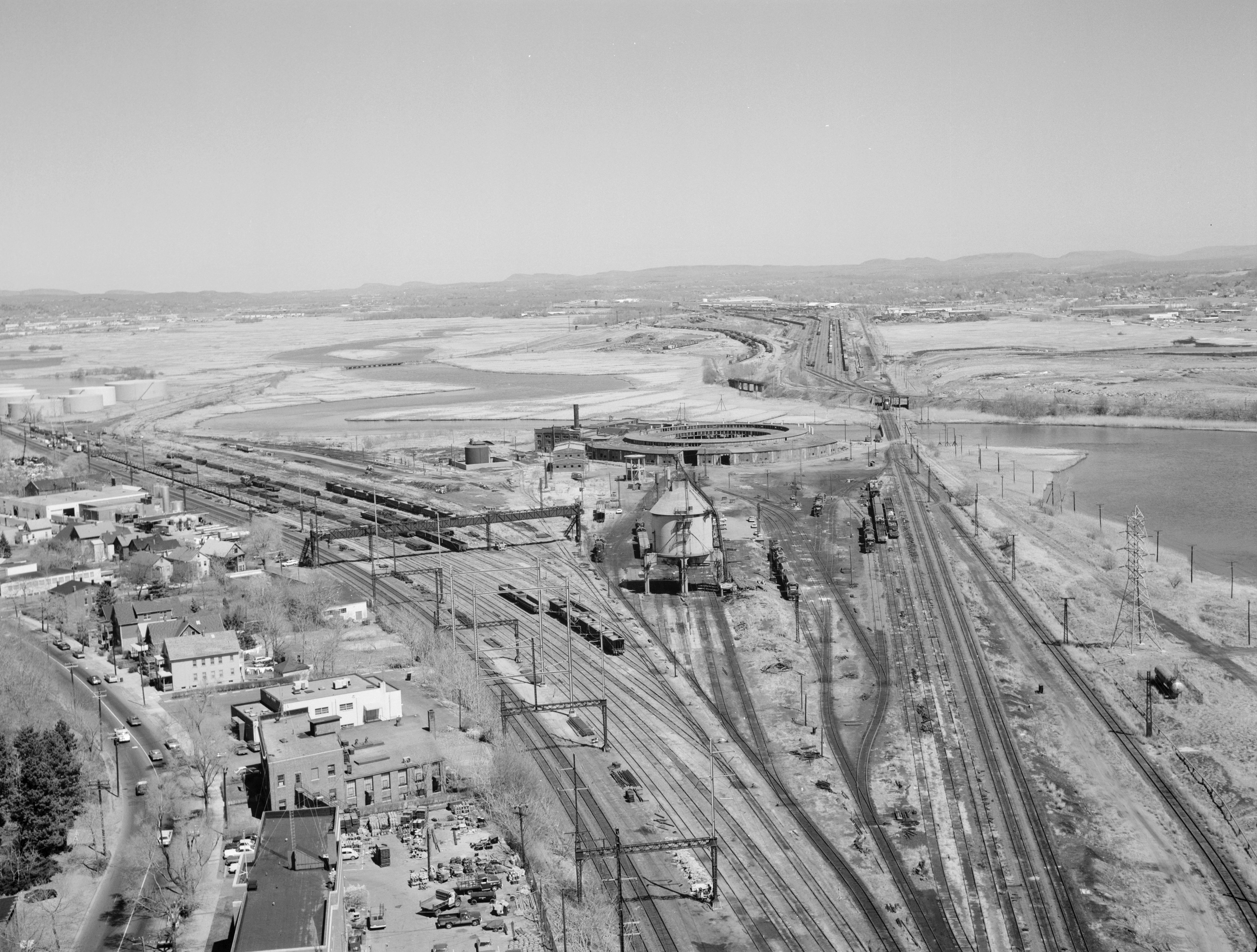
View of the yard and the Quinnipiac River, 1977

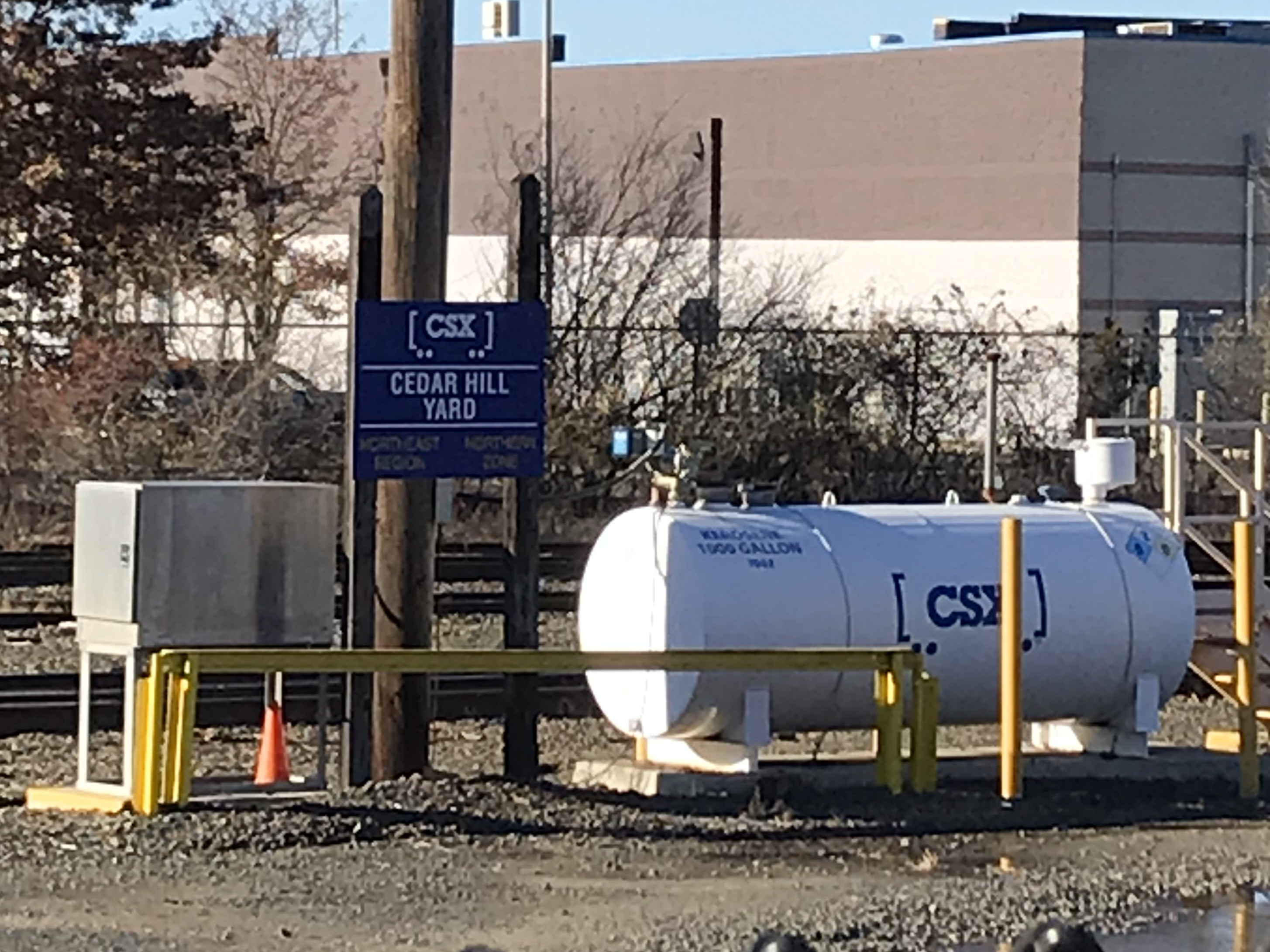
Main sign at the yard, 2021

The location of Cedar Hill Yard in Connecticut

Cedar Hill Yard is a classification yard located in New Haven, North Haven and Hamden, Connecticut, United States. It was built by the New York, New Haven and Hartford Railroad (often known simply as The New Haven) in the early 1890s in and around New Haven's Cedar Hill neighborhood, which gave the yard its name. Electrical catenary for electric locomotives was added to the yard in 1915. To handle increasing traffic as a result of World War I, the yard was greatly expanded between 1917 and 1920 with additional construction along both sides of the Quinnipiac River. The construction project added two humps where railroad cars were sorted into trains by gravity. The yard was further modernized in the 1920s, becoming one of the busiest railroad yards in the United States, and the most important yard in the entire New Haven Railroad system.

At its peak during World War II, Cedar Hill Yard handled more than 5,000 railroad cars per day. Following the end of the war the yard's importance began to decline, as freight traffic across New England shifted to road transport, and heavy industry left the region. Much of the yard began to fall into decay following the New Haven Railroad's bankruptcy in 1961. Following the opening of the newly rebuilt Selkirk Yard near Albany, New York, in 1968, much of the traffic formerly handled at Cedar Hill Yard was directed there instead, and car float service between Cedar Hill Yard and New York City ended.

In 1969, the Penn Central Transportation Company took over the yard as part of its purchase of the New Haven Railroad. The yard's new owner promptly removed the electrical catenary and shut down one of the yard's two humps to save money. The next year, Penn Central went bankrupt, and the yard continued to deteriorate from deferred maintenance. Under Penn Central, the yard's importance further declined when the Poughkeepsie Bridge, the yard's key link to the rest of the United States, was damaged by a fire in 1974 and not replaced. Conrail, a new freight railroad formed by the United States government to reverse the fortunes of Penn Central and other bankrupt Northeastern United States railroads, took over operations in 1976. The yard's new owner initially made some improvements, but in 1980 decided to close the yard's remaining hump and move more operations to the yard in Selkirk. Cedar Hill Yard continued to be used to classify freight trains, but was turned into a flat yard, with trains built up and broken down by switcher locomotives.

Cedar Hill Yard was operated by Conrail until 1999, when CSX Transportation purchased Conrail's New England operations. In the first decade of the 2000s, CSX expanded the yard's operations by constructing a bulk cargo transfer facility, where bulk commodities are transferred between trains and trucks. CSX was joined in the yard by other railroads, including Amtrak, which uses part of the yard as a base for maintenance of way operations on the Northeast Corridor. Two other freight railroads also operate freight trains to and from the yard in the 2020s, including the Providence and Worcester Railroad and Connecticut Southern Railroad. Cedar Hill Yard remains the largest classification yard in Connecticut as of 2022 despite its diminished size. Proposals exist to rebuild portions of the yard, potentially in concert with the construction of the proposed Cross-Harbor Rail Tunnel in New York City or the resumption of car float service across Long Island Sound.

== History ==
=== Before 1917 ===
The first instance of Cedar Hill Yard was built in the early 1890s by the New York, New Haven and Hartford Railroad (The New Haven) in and around the Cedar Hill neighborhood of the city of New Haven, on flat lands adjacent to the Quinnipiac River. The yard first opened for service in December 1894, with a capacity of approximately 400 railroad cars. Less than a year later, the new yard caused a dispute between the railroad and its employees. Once Cedar Hill Yard opened, train crews had to stop their trains within the new yard as opposed to the yard in New Haven proper, which reportedly increased their shifts by several hours. Employees demanded extra pay for the longer hours, but the railroad refused, leading several train crews to walk off the job. One railway man was quoted by a local newspaper as saying:

We think that it is no more than fair that extra pay be given us for all work over eight hours for yard men and all over ten hours for through men. Those men who run into New Haven and were ordered to take their trains to Cedar Hill, were done an injustice. It takes at least two hours to sidetrack a train there and get back into the city and I do not blame the men for refusing to do it unless paid for extra time.

Operations at the yard came to a halt on November 21, 1901, when approximately 125 switchmen and brakemen went on strike in solidarity with strikers at Mott Haven. The New Haven's president John M. Hall asserted the strike would quickly end, as the strikers had no specific grievances beyond sympathy for the Mott Haven strikers, who had gone on strike following the abrupt termination of the yard's assistant yard master. The strike came to an end on November 23.

On July 31, 1904, a deadly train collision occurred just outside of Cedar Hill Yard. The New Haven's White Mountain passenger train collided with the rear of a freight train attempting to pull into a siding by the yard, resulting in the death of the White Mountain's engineer, while the train's fireman survived with severe injuries. A coroner found the crew of the freight train criminally responsible for the crash, as they had neglected to send a flagman behind their train to warn the White Mountain, which they knew was due to arrive, that the tracks were not clear. As a result of the crash, operations were changed so that all northbound trains entered the yard at the south end.

In 1913, the New Haven began adding electrical catenary to the yard as part of its electrification program; electrification was completed by July 1915. By 1915, it was apparent the existing yard was not large enough to handle the amount of freight it was receiving. A local newspaper reported that "There were so many freight cars lying in the yard that switchers could not travel from the north to the south end of the yards." The severity of the freight congestion was enough to delay the New Haven's passenger trains through the area as well.

=== The yard is expanded, 1917 to 1920 ===
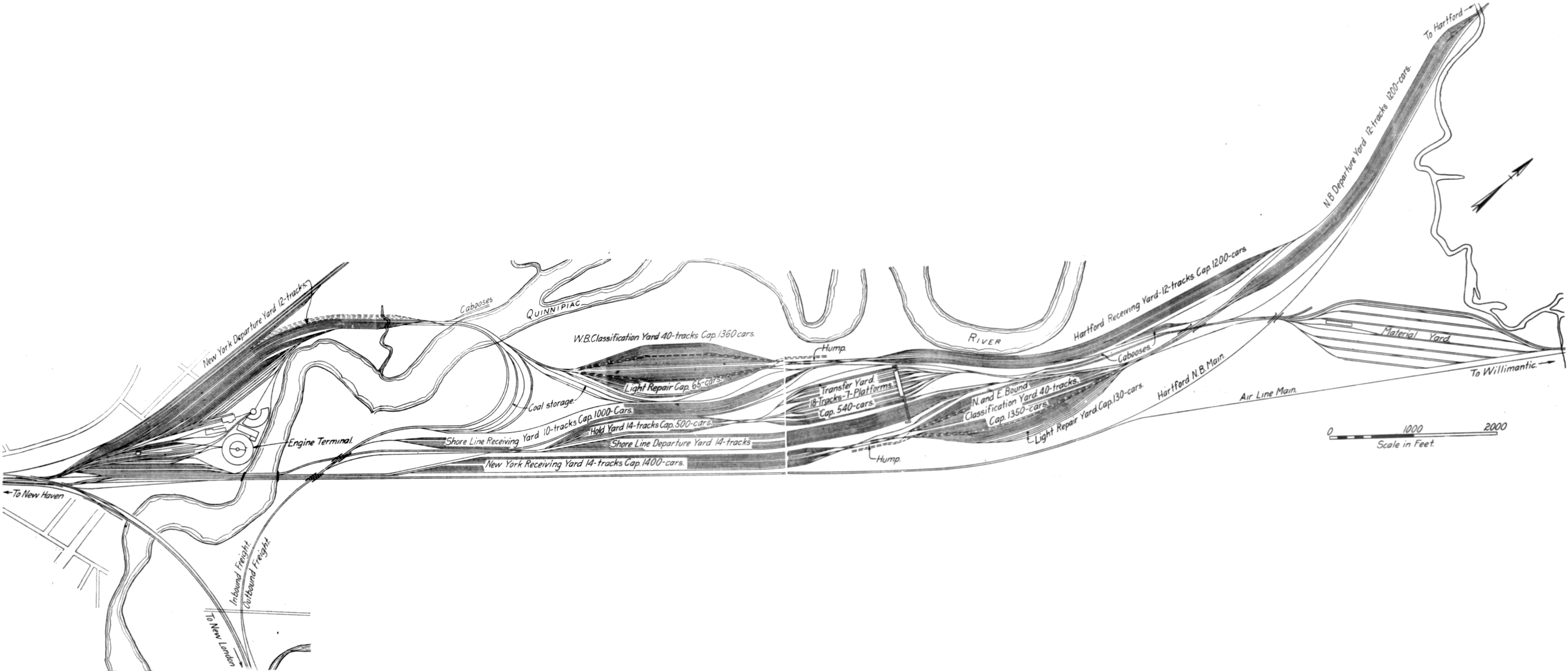
A map of the new Cedar Hill Yard in 1918, while it was still under construction

The New Haven Railroad purchased approximately 500 acres (200 ha) of land in the Cedar Hill area in 1917 in order to construct a new classification yard. Originally, the company had planned to build a new yard in nearby Woodmont, but instead built it at Cedar Hill due to local opposition. Construction began the same year. The expansion project was initially budgeted at $10 million ($214 million in 2025), but upon the United States Railroad Administration's takeover of all U.S. railroads in December 1917 following U.S. entry into World War I, the federal government doubled the project's budget to $20 million and allocated government engineers to assist in construction. This greatly increased the scope of the project, with the terminal and facilities estimated to take up more than 2,000 acres (810 ha) of land in total upon completion.

==== Design ====
Cedar Hill was chosen as the site for the new classification yard for a variety of reasons. New Haven was the nexus of eight different railroad routes operated by the New Haven Railroad, including lines to New York City, Danbury, Waterbury, Northampton, Hartford, Middletown, New London, and the docks in New Haven south of the yard. Cedar Hill was also the eastern end of the New Haven's electrification, was centrally located in the railroad's system, and was at a good location for locomotives travelling between New York City and Boston to stop for servicing. Other factors included the significant industrial activity in the city of New Haven, the high cost of buying property any closer to New York City, and the New Haven's existing facilities and land in the area.

The yard's design called for a capacity of 180 cars per hour over two humps, for a classification capacity of 4,320 cars each day. Significant design work went into planning the height and slope of the yard's humps, so that cars rolling downhill would travel at the desired speeds, accelerating up to 18 mph (29 km/h) after passing through the switches. Several tracks were planned that travelled between the humps and the classification yards and accommodated speeders; these were used by the workers who rode along with the cars down the hump and manually applied handbrakes to slow them down. Using speeders to return to the hump instead of walking saved time and required fewer workers to handle the same number of cars per hour. Additional planned facilities included a yard for storing materials and a coal storage yard with a capacity of 100,000 short tons (91,000 t) of coal.

As part of the yard's construction, the New Haven completed a grade separation at the south end of the yard, where lines from New Haven to Hartford, New London, and Middletown met. This eliminated all diamond crossings between different routes at Cedar Hill, removing a long-standing bottleneck on the New Haven Railroad's system.

==== Construction ====
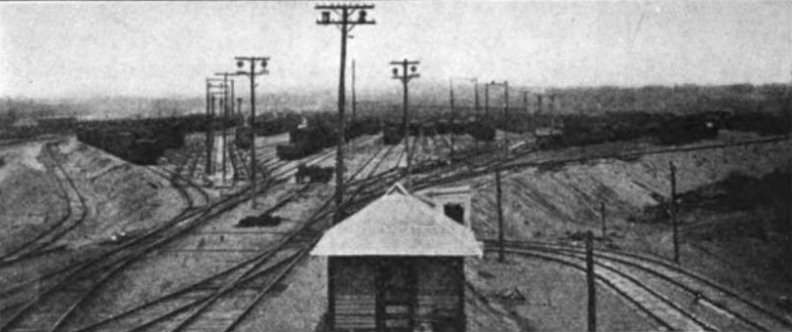
A view of the North and Eastbound classification yard at Cedar Hill Yard in the early 1920s.

The site for the new expanded yard largely consisted of marshland, which complicated construction. Over 3,000,000 cubic yards (2,300,000 m^{3}) of fill was required for the project, which had to be delivered from cuts made elsewhere on the New Haven system. In particular, the two humps had to be built on the previously flat land, with one of them being 30 feet (9 m) in height. To accomplish this, trestles were built and then buried with fill, creating the hills needed for the humps. Construction of the trestles required piles to be driven up to 60 feet (18 m) underground due to the soft soil. For moving and transporting soil, the New Haven Railroad purchased 120 side-dump gondolas, and seven steam shovels worked to fill the side-dump cars at cut sites. Locomotives backed trains of 15 gondolas at a time up the trestles, and dumped fill under them until the fill was level with the tracks, leaving the trestles covered by soil.

As part of the yard's expansion, a new freight transfer station to handle less-than-car load freight was built, which opened in July 1920. This eleven-track transfer facility was equipped with what were at the time very modern battery-powered freight tractors to sort freight throughout the facility, and could handle over 300 freight cars per day. As a result of the opening of the transfer facility, located in the center of the yard, the New Haven Railroad was able to close multiple similar but less modern facilities across its system. The new Cedar Hill Yard finished construction in 1920. At the time of its completion, Cedar Hill was the largest railyard east of the Mississippi River in the United States.

=== 1920 to 1950 ===
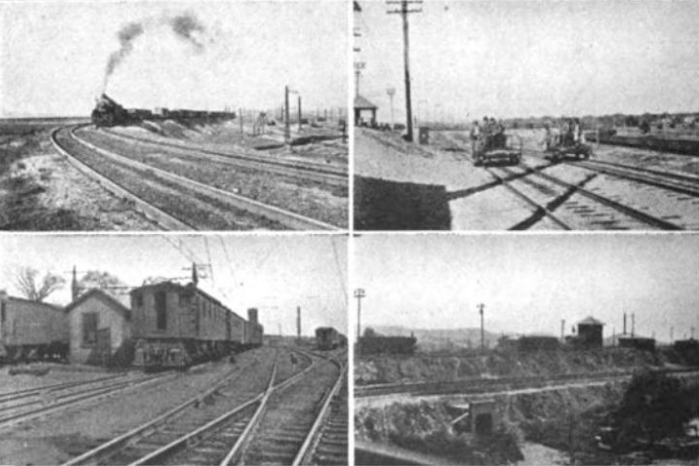
A collage showing operations at Cedar Hill Yard around 1920.

Despite hopes that the new yard would eliminate traffic problems, traffic volumes continued to skyrocket after the new Cedar Hill Yard opened, and in the first few years of operations it suffered from congestion. The freight portion of the nearby Water Street Yard, which was closed when the expansion of Cedar Hill Yard was completed, was reopened in March 1922 to relieve capacity issues. The next year, one local manufacturer declared at a hearing of the Interstate Commerce Commission (ICC) that the new yard had failed in improving capacity and speed of freight shipments, a sentiment shared by Grand Trunk Pacific Railway president Howard G. Kelley. Kelley was part of the Storrow committee, a group working to draft policy for the New England railroad system. That the New Haven had spent so much money to build Cedar Hill Yard was considered by critics and some members of the committee as evidence that New England's railroads should be consolidated into a single system, though the ICC's commissioners were skeptical of such a proposal.

An automatic train stop system was installed from Cedar Hill Yard north to Springfield, Massachusetts, in 1925, with it entering operation on the first of September. In 1926, Cedar Hill handled 97,328 cars per month, for an average of 3,200 cars each day. Particularly busy days saw over 4,000 cars classified in 24 hours. By 1928, Cedar Hill Yard and its surrounding facilities occupied 880 acres (360 ha) of land. The massive yards had a capacity of over 15,000 railroad cars.

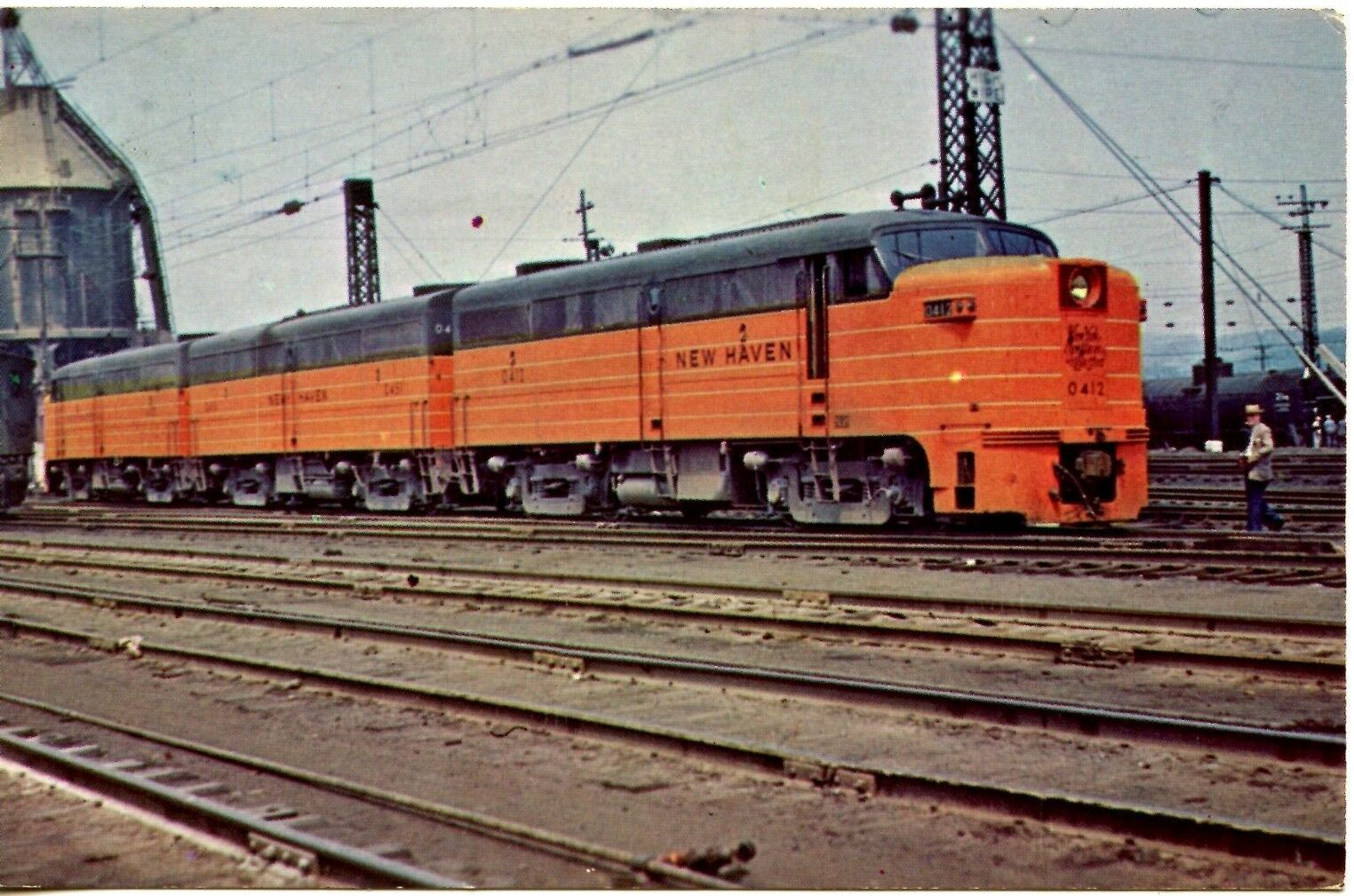
New Haven ALCO FA locomotives at Cedar Hill Yard in 1949

On August 29, 1928, an attempt was made by unknown person(s) to sabotage an express passenger train travelling from Montreal to Washington, D.C., through the yard. A railroad employee walking along the tracks noticed a railroad spike lodged into the rails in an attempt to derail the train, which was carrying over $2 million (37.5 million in 2025 dollars) worth of gold along with over 350 passengers. A derailment was averted when the employee flagged down the train, which reportedly came to a stop 30 feet (9 m) away from the spike. In 1929, the New Haven commenced another major project to improve the yard by adding retarders and wiring switches to be remotely operated from control towers, improving both the safety and speed of the classification process. In total, 44 retarders were installed at Cedar Hill, along with 88 switches converted. This allowed an end to the practice of workers riding along each car going down the hump and applying handbrakes, improving safety and reducing the number of workers required to run the yard. In 1932, the New Haven reported that the installation of retarders at Cedar Hill Yard had reduced the time it took to classify cars by 35 percent, along with a reduction in expenses. By 1941, Cedar Hill Yard held the title of "the world's largest single-railroad-operated freight yard". A tour granted to a reporter for the Meriden Record in 1941 affords a snapshot of how the yard operated at its peak immediately before World War II. The reporter arrived at the yard on a train from Springfield, Massachusetts, and observed his train being reclassified over one of the yard's humps. The train was first inspected for defects by eight car inspectors, and then sent over the hump. The 70-car train was fully sorted in 14 minutes. The railroad operated four control towers to run the yard, which were linked to each other by a PA system and the world's longest pneumatic tube system, with one tube stretching for three miles (4.8 km) and requiring seven minutes for a cartridge to travel from one end to the other. At the time of the reporter's visit, the yard's twin roundhouses serviced 44 freight locomotives, 185 passenger locomotives, and 8 switchers each day.

Cedar Hill Yard was at its busiest during World War II, with very heavy traffic in support of the war effort. In 1943, particularly busy days saw as many as 5,000 cars classified in a 24 hour period. The railroad faced challenges due to labor shortages at this time, as a result of many men being drafted to fight in the war. During the war, a significant amount of traffic travelled between New York City and the yard by car float, moved by the New Haven Railroad's fleet of tugboats.

=== 1950 to 1969 ===
A fire broke out on one of the yard's bridges across the Quinnipiac River on July 5, 1953. The three-track bridge, 300 feet (91 m) in length, was completely destroyed. Traffic was rerouted over alternate trestles until the repairs, estimated by a New Haven Railroad spokesperson to cost up to $100,000 (equivalent to $970,000 in 2020 dollars), could be completed.

A 1954 inventory showed Cedar Hill Yard including the following facilities:

Yard name	Car capacity
Maybrook receiving (Note: Receiving yards are where trains entering the yard are initially stored, before being sent over one of the humps for classification.)	924
Transfer platforms	718
North and eastbound classification (Note: Classification yards are where trains from the receiving yards are classified based on their next destination, by being sent over a hump and switched to different tracks.)	1,763
Creosoting plant	430
Northbound departure (Note: Departure yards are where sorted trains are moved to, before having road locomotives attached and leaving the yard for various destinations.)	502
Southbound receiving	441
Material storage	350
Shore Line receiving	583
Westbound classification	1,854
Shore line departure	857
Maybrook departure	1,436
Air line receiving	403
Enginehouse yard	193

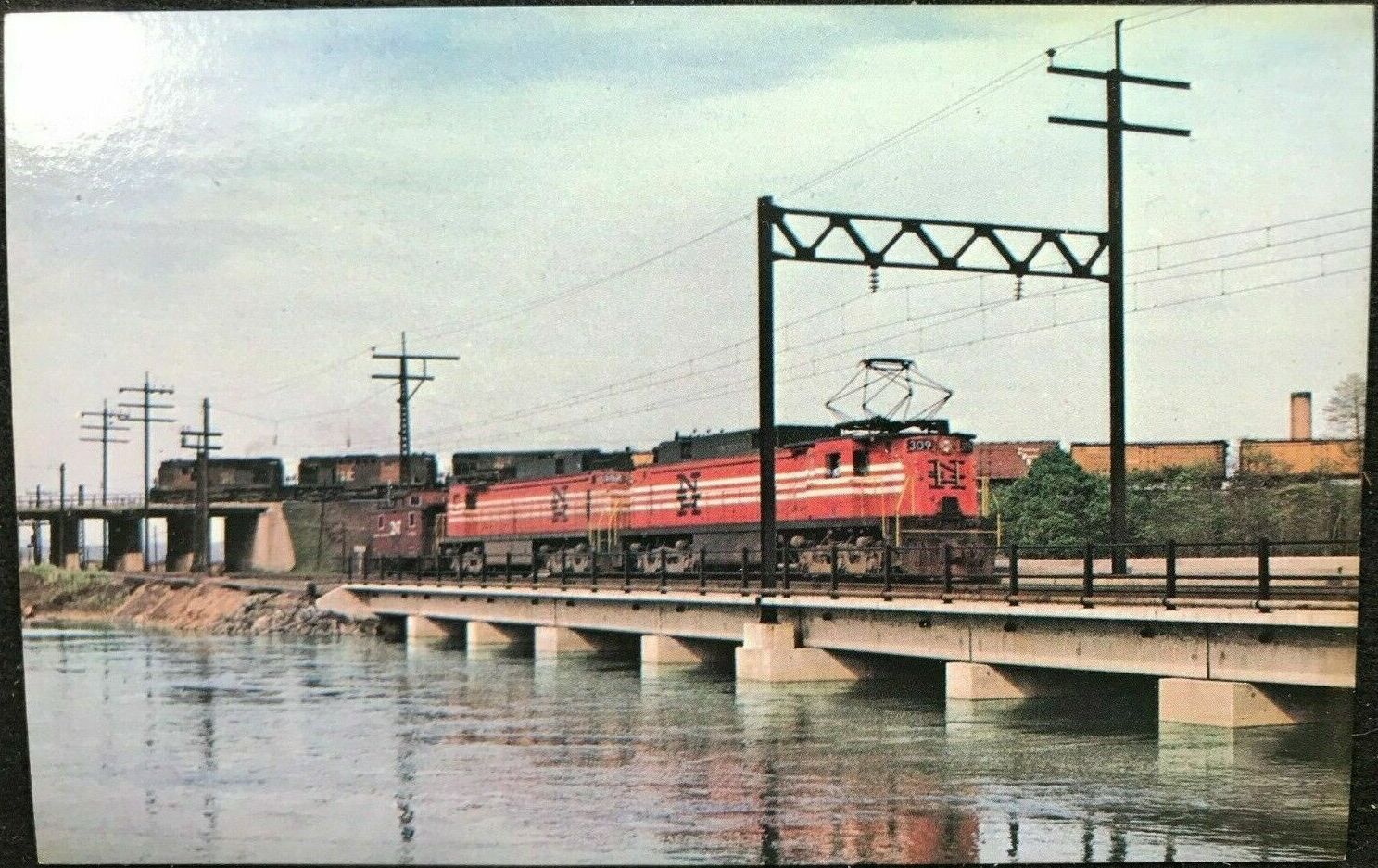
New Haven Railroad EF-4 electric locomotives at Cedar Hill Yard in 1964

In 1958, the yard handled over 3,000 cars each day. 1958 would also be the last profitable year for operations at Cedar Hill Yard for many years; ironically, this was thanks to significant business hauling concrete for highway construction. These same highways made truck transportation more viable, and reduced the amount of railroad shipments to and from the yard. On August 16, 1959, the New Haven decided to close the western hump after a fire damaged the bridge and tracks connecting it to the rest of the yard. Traffic was redirected to the railroad's Maybrook Yard in Maybrook, New York. The remaining hump and the yard at Maybrook were unable to handle all of the traffic, requiring the railroad hastily rebuild the damaged tracks and bridge and return the western hump to service, which was completed on March 28, 1960, at an expense of $200,000 (equivalent to $1,750,000 in 2020). The New Haven's initial decision not to replace the damaged bridge resulted in criticism; a union observer testified to the Connecticut public utilities commission that delays from the damaged bridge resulted in train crews and locomotives spending hours at a time idling, an expense the financially troubled railroad could ill afford. The following year, the New Haven's financial problems forced it into bankruptcy, and conditions at the yard began to decline due to deferred maintenance. Car float service between Cedar Hill Yard and New York and New Jersey ended in 1968, when Selkirk Yard was rebuilt, resulting in a significant reduction in traffic.

=== Penn Central takes over, 1969 to 1976 ===
In 1969, the bankrupt New Haven Railroad was merged into newly-formed Penn Central Transportation Company, which inherited the yard. Soon after, Penn Central shut down the western hump at the yard, leaving only one hump in operation. That same year, electrified operations were discontinued, and the catenary in the yard was dismantled. Under Penn Central, the yard was largely in a state of decay. The retarders in the yard had never been upgraded or replaced since their installation in 1929, and were no longer able to apply enough force to cars to slow them. The employees came up with a solution that was dubbed the 'toothpick machine': workers in the yard placed pieces of wood ("toothpicks") on the rails in front of each car, to reduce their speed as they went down the hump. A 1974 U.S. Senate report assessing issues in agricultural transportation opined that "Considering the price of new lumber these days, it is quite possible a new retarder would be cheaper." On June 12, 1973, another trestle in the yard was destroyed by a fire. The trestle was part of a freight bypass that connected to the line towards Hartford from the north end of the yard. Penn Central was forced to route northbound trains from the yard through the city of New Haven until the trestle could be repaired. Operations at Cedar Hill were severely impacted by a fire on the Poughkeepsie Bridge in May 1974, which suspended all traffic between New Haven and points west that travelled across the bridge via the Maybrook Line. The bridge remained closed despite a directive to reopen it from Malcolm Wilson, the Governor of New York, later that year. Plans for rebuilding the bridge were repeatedly delayed, with New York representative Benjamin Gilman calling the situation a "seminar on government procrastination". A legal fight over the fate of the bridge continued for years, with Connecticut's congressional delegation opposed to the federal plan to abandon the bridge and route freight to Cedar Hill via a circuitous route through Albany, New York, and Springfield, Massachusetts. A representative of the Connecticut Department of Transportation (CTDOT) observed that freight shipments between Washington, D.C., and Boston increased in time from 6 hours to 31 hours when traveling this inland route.

=== Conrail assumes operations, 1976 to 1999 ===
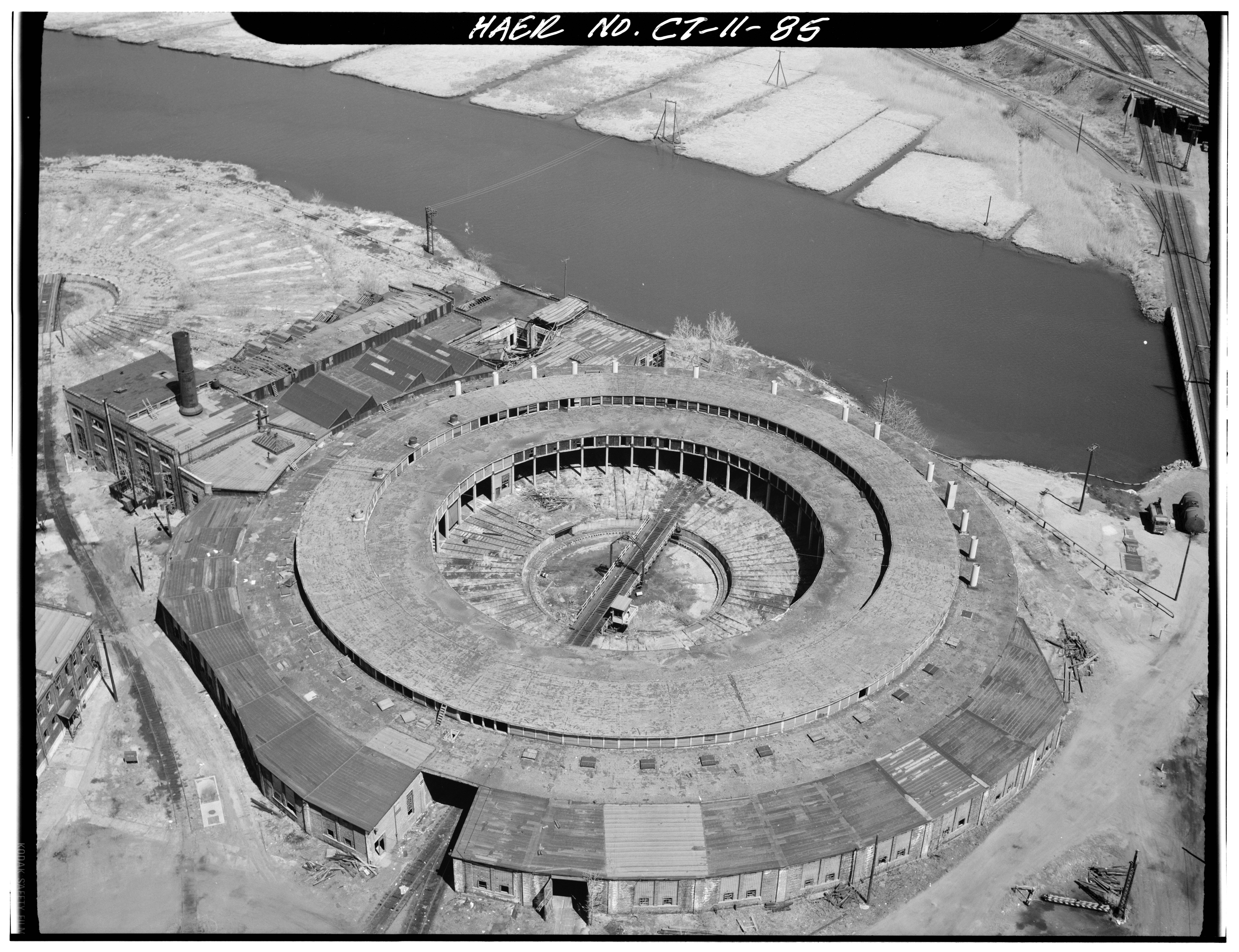
The yard once included two roundhouses (pictured in 1977) but both have since been demolished

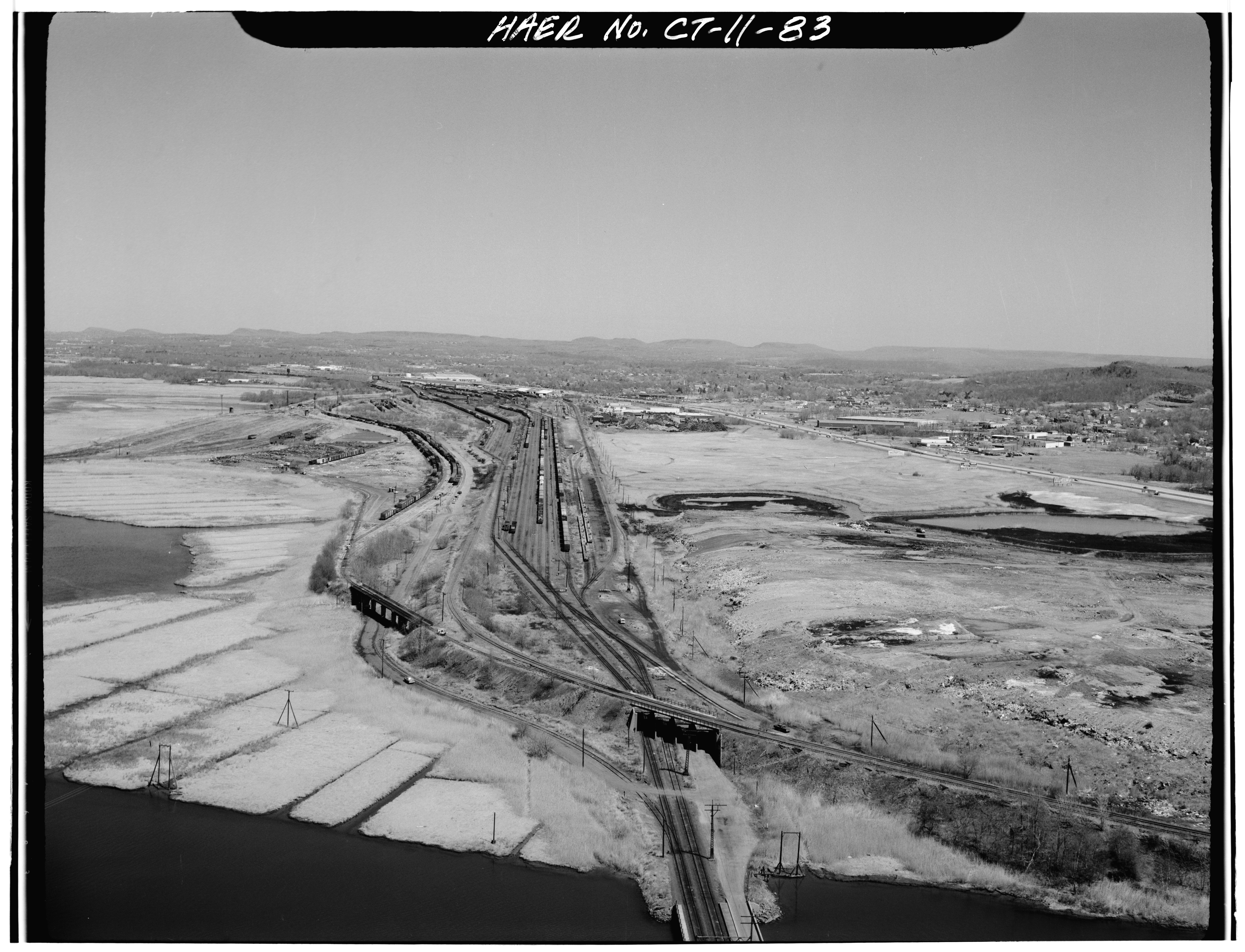
The eastern portion of the yard includes a flyover (pictured in 1977) and was once the site of the yard's two humps

Penn Central was merged into Conrail in 1976, along with many other bankrupt or troubled railroads in the Northeast, making Conrail the yard's new owner beginning in April. Working with the Connecticut Department of Transportation, Conrail began efforts to bring portions of Cedar Hill into a state of good repair. The company spent over $1 million (5.66 million in 2025) on track resurfacing and tie replacement between Cedar Hill and Hartford Yard by August 1976, four months after beginning operations at the yards, including replacement of over 15,000 ties in Cedar Hill, and the resurfacing (tamping) of 20 miles (32 km) of yard tracks. Conrail also rebuilt and reopened several tracks in the yard that had been out of service due to their unsafe condition, a consequence of deferred maintenance. The railroad projected it would spend over $3 million (17 million in 2025) on repairs between the two yards; Conrail's Northeast Region general manager told a local newspaper that "By the end of the year, 30,000 more ties will be installed in Cedar Hill and Hartford Yards and an additional 34 miles (55 km) of tracks surfaced".

Conrail initially focused on expanding Trailer On FlatCar (TOFC) service in a joint project with the CTDOT. In August 1976, Cedar Hill averaged 34 TOFC loads per day, and Conrail projected this number to double upon the completion of a clearance raising project for a bridge in Berlin, Connecticut. Conrail also planned to rebuild the remaining hump to accommodate modern railcars. At the end of 1976, Conrail reported a 37 percent increase in traffic at the yard for November and December, thanks to the successful completion of the bridge raising project, which added six inches (15 cm) of clearance.

In 1978, two years into Conrail's tenure, Cedar Hill was processing roughly 300 cars a day, significantly less than it had in the New Haven days. Of the 14 individual yards which made up Cedar Hill Yard, seven remained in use, with a maximum capacity of 4,000 cars per day. At this point the yard employed 200 workers, down from its peak of 1,000. Traffic declined precipitously due to the opening of the newly rebuilt and computerized Selkirk Yard, which took the majority of Cedar Hill's previous freight. Though Cedar Hill Yard remained the largest classification yard in New England, Conrail spokesman Robert McKernan summed up the change in the yards importance by stating that while it continued to be an indispensable link for freight traffic in southern Connecticut, the rebuilding of Selkirk Yard ended its status as essential for Southern New England as a whole. Primary commodities entering the yard at this point were trap rock, metals, food, chemicals, and general merchandise. Conrail also began to downsize its workforce at the yard, laying off dozens of employees between 1977 and 1979 and attracting the ire of Congressman Robert Giaimo.

Amtrak, the national passenger rail operator formed by the United States Congress, acquired a portion of Cedar Hill Yard in April 1976 from Penn Central through the provisions of the Regional Rail Reorganization Act of 1973. Amtrak took over the western portion of the yard, including the former western hump. In 1978, an Amtrak spokesman said of its portion of the yard that "Eventually it will be a major yard" used to support Amtrak services in Southern New England. The railroad initially used its space at the yard for storage along with a facility for continuous welded rail.

Despite previous plans, the end of hump operations at Cedar Hill arrived in April 1980, when Conrail took the remaining hump out of service permanently. Short on funds and operating at a loss, Conrail downsized the yard in favor of the newer yard at Selkirk. From this point on, all operations were done by flat switching. In October 1981, facing continuing financial problems, Conrail announced its intention to file to abandon its line over the Hudson River via the Poughkeepsie Bridge, ending the prospect of the bridge returning to service. With the line abandoned, the key link between Cedar Hill Yard and the rest of the country was severed.

Illegal dumping of toxic mercury was discovered in an abandoned portion of the yard in 1988, resulting in an investigation involving the Connecticut Department of Energy and Environmental Protection, the Federal Bureau of Investigation, and the Environmental Protection Agency being launched. The next year, two men who owned an auto repair shop next to the yard were convicted of illegally disposing of the mercury and sentenced to prison time as a result of the investigation.

Conrail employees at Cedar Hill Yard briefly went on strike on April 17, 1991, as part of a nationwide strike by railroad workers. This strike was ended the next day by a bill which banned railroad workers from striking, while also creating a committee to work out issues between railroad workers and employers, which was quickly passed by the United States Congress and signed by President George H. W. Bush.

Amtrak formally established the Cedar Hill MOW Base at the yard in 1992. The facility supports Amtrak's maintenance operations on the New Haven–Springfield Line and in New Haven, and equipment used for these purposes is stored at the yard.

=== CSX assumes control, 1999 to present ===
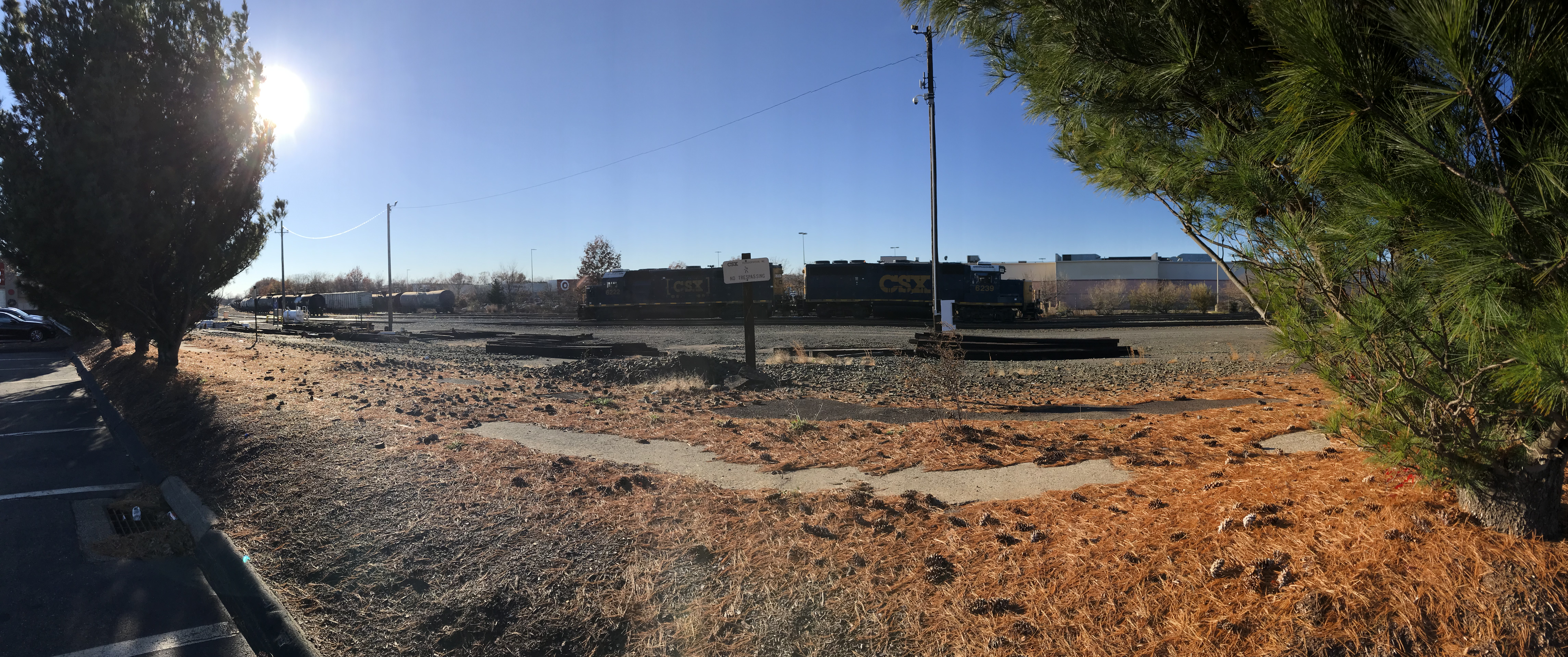
Two CSX GP40-2 locomotives idle in the yard in 2021

In 1999, Conrail's lines in New England were purchased by CSX Transportation. Following its assumption of operations, CSX began to develop Cedar Hill Yard in the early 2000s for the loading, unloading, and transfer of bulk cargo such as lumber and cement between trucks and trains. The railroad has continued the TOFC business that was run by Conrail, but much of it is now moved between Cedar Hill Yard and CSX's West Springfield, Massachusetts yard by truck due to limited capacity on the New Haven–Springfield Line, which is a busy passenger train corridor.

In the late 2000s, a new rail line was built to connect the yard to the port of New Haven. As of 2021, this line is operated by the Providence and Worcester Railroad.

Amtrak discovered high concentrations of PCBs within its portion of the yard during track repairs in 2005 and 2006. The railroad has worked with the Connecticut Department of Energy and Environmental Protection and the United States Environmental Protection Agency to identify the scope of contamination and plan mitigation and cleanup. Following a request from both agencies, Amtrak completed testing within CSX's portion of the yard between 2017 and 2022 and confirmed PCBs were present there as well. Amtrak has reported it is working on a joint cleanup project with CSX as of 2023.

A fire occurred in Cedar Hill Yard on July 23, 2016. The North Haven Fire Department responded to a report of a hopper car filled with construction debris on fire. The fire was extinguished without incident within a few hours.

== Present day ==
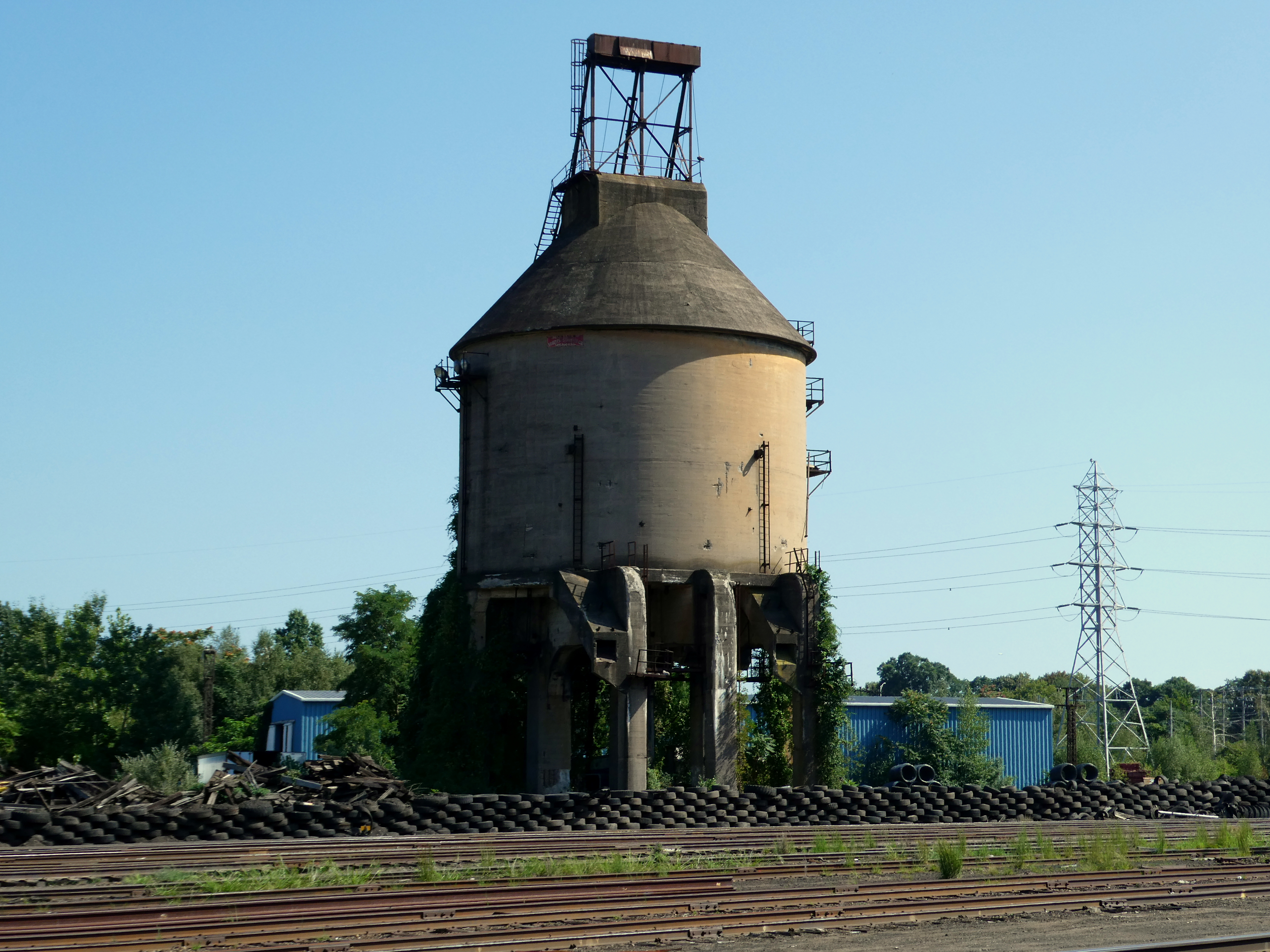
The 1927 built coaling tower remains a prominent landmark in the Cedar Hill neighborhood today

As of 2021, CSX remains the owner and main operator at Cedar Hill Yard. Freight operations take place in the former Northbound Departure Yard and the North and Eastbound Classification Yard, both of which are now used for flat switching. The yard contains a TRANSFLO bulk cargo transfer terminal which handles transloading. From Cedar Hill, CSX operates local trains which serve freight customers on the New Haven Line, as well as the southern portion of the New Haven-Springfield Line. Connecticut Southern Railroad is under contract by CSX to move freight between Cedar Hill Yard and the yard in West Springfield, Massachusetts, on the CSX Berkshire Subdivision.

Another occupant of the yard is Amtrak, which uses it to store equipment and as a base for maintenance of way operations on the Northeast Corridor in Connecticut. Amtrak occupies the portion of the yard west of the Quinnipiac River. The yard also contains the headquarters for the company's New England Division. As of 2016, Amtrak employs approximately 100 people at Cedar Hill. Some of Amtrak's yard is leased to a local manufacturer of welded rail. The Providence and Worcester Railroad leases a few tracks in the yard from CSX and Amtrak for locomotive servicing and freight use. The railroad also moves dedicated aggregate trains in and out of the yard.

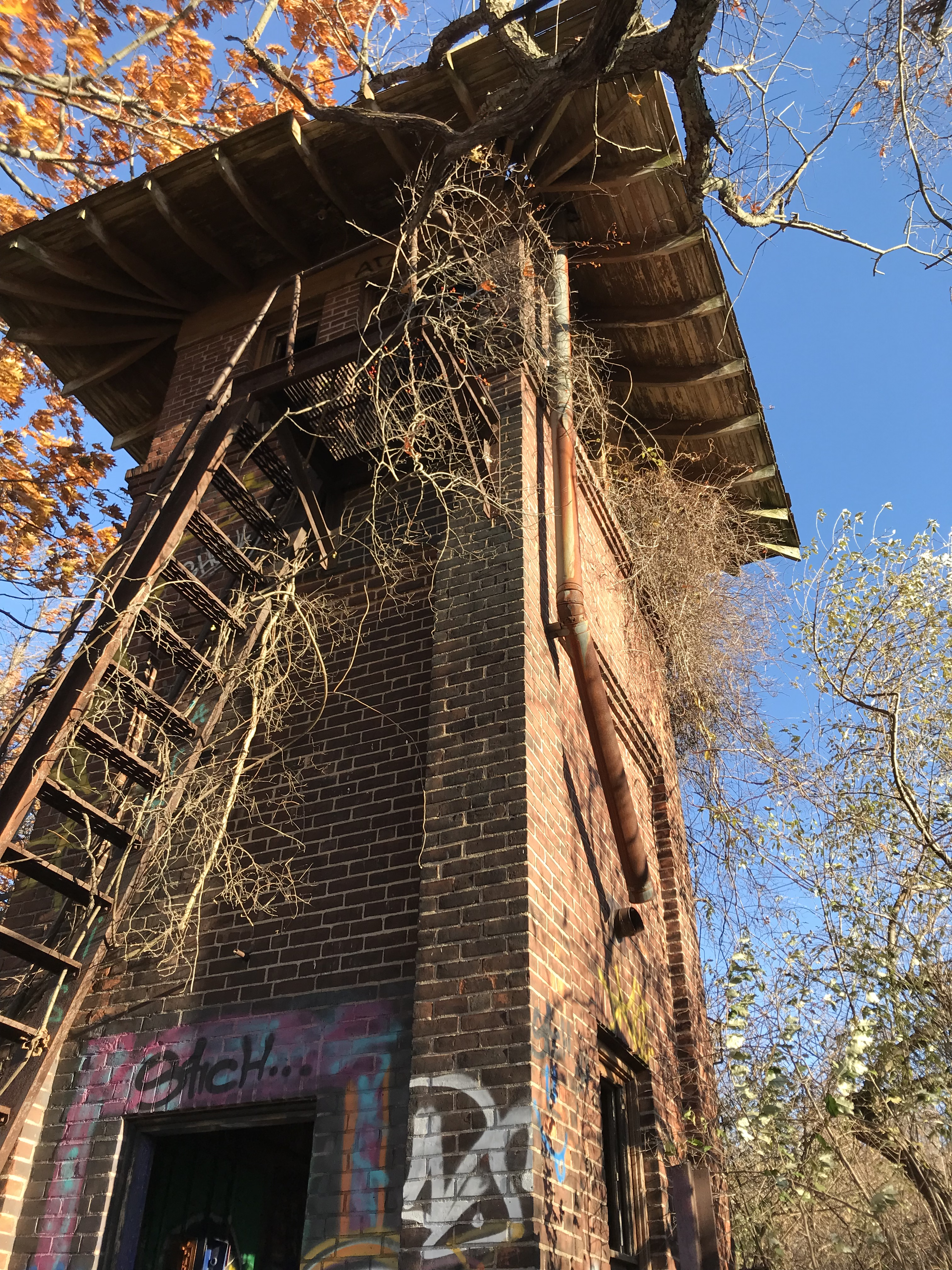
As business declined, much of the yard was gradually abandoned, such as this switch tower, seen in 2021.

In the 21st century, much of the yard now lies abandoned and is an attraction for urban explorers, despite the dangers of the old buildings and facilities which contain lead paint and asbestos. The former New Haven Railroad coaling tower, built in 1927, stands abandoned to this day within Amtrak's portion of the yard and is a local landmark.

== Future plans ==
While as of 2021 the yard was operating at a small fraction of its former level of activity, since the 1980s there have been several proposals that would increase traffic. The proposed Cross-Harbor Rail Tunnel in New York City would result in more usage of Cedar Hill Yard. Since so much of the yard is not in use, advocates have proposed rebuilding the abandoned portions of the yard to handle new rail freight traffic from the tunnel if it is built. Officials in Connecticut have supported this proposal as a means of reducing truck traffic on the frequently congested Connecticut Turnpike between New York City and New Haven. Additionally, in 2011, a proposal was considered to reintroduce car float service between New Haven and New Jersey, with Cedar Hill Yard as the staging location for the New Haven terminus.

== Location ==
As built, the yard was situated where three railroad lines met, all of which remain in service as of 2022. These are the Shore Line Railway, which travelled east along the Connecticut coast past New Haven; the Hartford and New Haven Railroad, which travelled north to Hartford and Springfield; and the "Air Line" (Boston and New York Air-Line Railroad) which travelled northeast from New Haven towards Middletown. By the time the first instance of Cedar Hill Yard was constructed, all three companies were part of the New York, New Haven and Hartford Railroad, which controlled nearly all railroad traffic in Connecticut. Two other railroad lines formerly entered New Haven near the yard: the New Haven and Northampton Railroad (the "Canal Line") diverged northward from the Shore Line Railway less than a mile west of Cedar Hill Yard, while in East Haven the New Haven and Derby Railroad connected New Haven to Derby. The New Haven and Derby line was abandoned in 1938, and in 1987 the connection with the Canal Line was cut due to low clearances that blocked modern railroad cars from entering and exiting the line. In the 21st century, the former Hartford and New Haven Railroad line is now Amtrak's New Haven–Springfield Line, the Air Line is part of the Providence and Worcester Railroad, and the Shore Line is part of Amtrak's Northeast Corridor.

== See also ==
- Electrification of the New York, New Haven, and Hartford Railroad
- Northup Avenue Yard
