= Connecticut Southern Railroad =

Freight railroad in Connecticut and Massachusetts

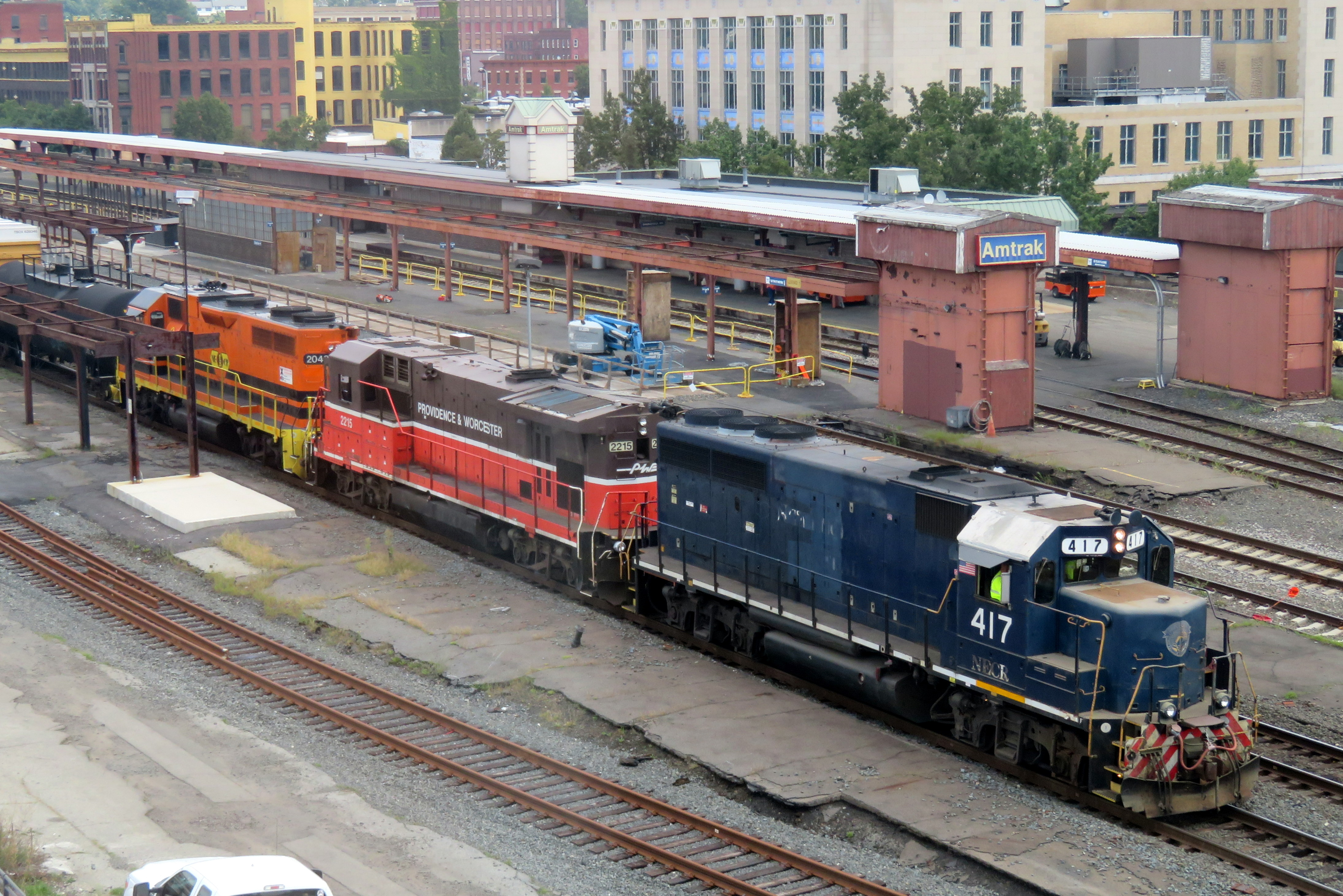
- A CSO freight train in Springfield in 2018

Overview
- Parent company: Genesee & Wyoming
- Headquarters: Hartford, Connecticut
- Reporting mark: CSO
- Locale: Connecticut and Massachusetts
- Dates of operation: 1996–present
- Predecessor: Conrail

Technical
- Track gauge: 4 ft 8 1/2 in (1,435 mm) standard gauge
- Length: 90 miles (140 km)

Other
- Website: CSO website

The Connecticut Southern Railroad (reporting mark CSO) is a 90-mile (140 km) short-line railroad operating in Connecticut and Massachusetts, United States. The company was formed in 1996 as a spinoff of Conrail by shortline holding company RailTex and subsequently acquired in 2000 by RailAmerica. Since 2012, it has been a subsidiary of Genesee & Wyoming. CSO is headquartered in Hartford, Connecticut, site of its Hartford Yard. The company also operates East Hartford Yard.

Connecticut Southern connects with CSX Transportation at yards in West Springfield, Massachusetts, and North Haven, Connecticut (Cedar Hill Yard). It also connects with the Providence and Worcester Railroad and Central New England Railroad in Hartford, and Pan Am Southern in Berlin. The company's main line is Amtrak's New Haven–Springfield Line, which CSO has trackage rights over; branches are also operated to Suffield, Windsor Locks, Manchester, and South Windsor. Much of the railroad's traffic comes from imports to Connecticut, such as lumber, steel, and carbon dioxide. The railroad also hauls exports of trash and recycling. As of 2022, CSO carries approximately 18,500 carloads annually.

== History ==
The Connecticut Southern Railroad began operations on September 22, 1996, following the purchase of several Conrail routes in Connecticut and Massachusetts by RailTex, the CSO's initial parent. CSO purchased or leased trackage in East Hartford, Manchester, and East Windsor, along with a pair of branch lines to Suffield and Windsor Locks. To connect with Conrail trains, the Connecticut Southern paid for trackage rights over both the New Haven–Springfield Line, owned and operated by Amtrak, and portions of Conrail's remaining trackage in Connecticut and Massachusetts.

Operations started with locomotives leased from Conrail, until the Connecticut Southern was able to acquire locomotives of its own. Conrail served as a partner of Connecticut Southern, supporting the company in working with customers, and in turn benefiting from increased customer satisfaction and carloads produced by the new shortline railroad.

In 1998, the company was reported to still use a caboose on trains. To access the yard in West Springfield, CSO trains need to enter the yard with a reverse move. For safety, a caboose was used to allow a crew member to watch the rear of the train during the reverse movement. Conrail's New England assets were absorbed by CSX Transportation in 1999, which became CSO's new connection in West Springfield and New Haven. Connecticut Southern was subsequently acquired by RailAmerica in 2000. Before the Great Recession, CSO peaked at 26,000 carloads per year.

In 2009, the Connecticut Department of Transportation filed a $7,775,000 TIGER grant application which included bridge work and track improvements for the entirety of the Connecticut Southern's trackage. In 2012, the railroad opened a new $1.4 million headquarters in Hartford, moving from a previously rented space in East Hartford. The project included a 10,500-square-foot (980 m^{2}) indoor facility for repairing locomotives and railcars, as well as 3,500 square feet (330 m^{2}) of office space. Genesee & Wyoming acquired the railroad as part of its acquisition of RailAmerica in 2012.

Genesee & Wyoming subsequently purchased the Providence and Worcester Railroad in November 2016, which connects with the Connecticut Southern, bringing both railroads under the same parent company. The State of Connecticut began Hartford Line commuter rail service in June 2018. This significantly expanded passenger train service on the New Haven–Springfield Line, but CSO's freight service was also taken into account during the project. Despite shifting freight operations to nocturnal hours, conflicts with Amtrak's maintenance of way operations have had a negative impact on freight traffic by causing delays.

Connecticut Southern assumed operations of the remainder of the Armory Branch from former interchange partner Central New England Railroad effective January 1, 2026.

== Operations ==
As of December 2019, the Connecticut Southern Railroad owns or operates on 90 miles (140 km) of trackage in Connecticut and Massachusetts. Major commodities transported include lumber, steel, and carbon dioxide, which are mostly imported from elsewhere. Another source of traffic is the export of trash and recycling from Connecticut. The company's base of operations is at Hartford Yard. As of 2022, the Connecticut Southern hauls approximately 18,500 carloads per year. As of 2018, CSO does not serve any customers within Massachusetts.

=== Lines operated ===
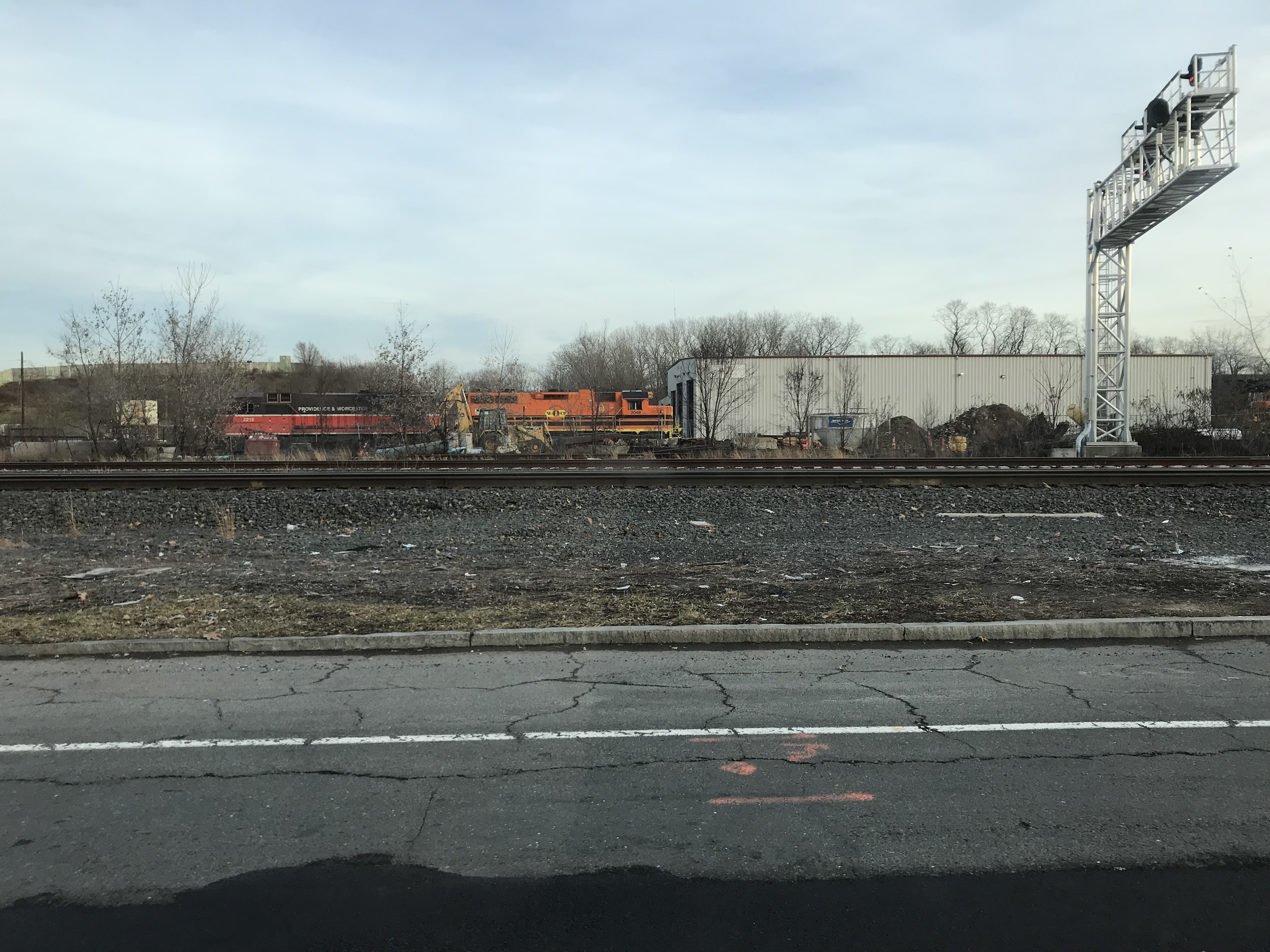
Locomotives from G&W subsidiaries Providence and Worcester Railroad and New England Central Railroad at Connecticut Southern's Hartford Yard

==== New Haven–Springfield Line ====
Connecticut Southern's main line is Amtrak's New Haven–Springfield Line, necessitating freight operations mostly at night with Amtrak-compliant cab-signal and PTC lead units. As Amtrak is strictly a passenger railroad, Connecticut Southern provides freight service over the entirety of the line, on which it has trackage rights. On this line, Connecticut Southern interchanges with CSX at Cedar Hill Yard in North Haven and at another yard in West Springfield, with Pan Am Southern in Berlin, and with both fellow Genesee and Wyoming subsidiary Providence and Worcester Railroad and the Central New England Railroad in Hartford.

==== Suffield Secondary ====
This line is a spur between Windsor Locks and Suffield, with a second spur that reaches Bradley International Airport. It was originally built in 1870 by the Windsor Locks and Suffield Railroad, which contracted operations to the Hartford and New Haven Railroad before the latter purchased it in 1871. The line was used by trolleys from the early 1900s until 1925, and then fully dedicated to freight services until 2008. The trackage leading to Suffield is now out of service and overgrown, leaving only the spur to the airport and the portion of the secondary leading to the second spur in operation. Rail service to Suffield had ended by July 2009, and Connecticut Southern filed for abandonment of the 2.4 miles (3.9 km) of track leading to the town in 2012. CSO announced they would remove the railroad ties and steel tracks for salvage in their abandonment filing. The town of Suffield attempted to stop the abandonment and salvage of the tracks to preserve them for potential future use. Bradley Airport is a CSO customer, as is Camp Hartell, an Army National Guard facility in Windsor Locks.

==== Wethersfield Subdivision ====
This line connects Hartford and Middletown. Connecticut Southern owns and operates the northernmost 3 miles (4.8 km) of the line; the remainder is owned by the state of Connecticut and operated by the Providence and Worcester Railroad. A short spur on this line, known as the Market Spur, connects to the Hartford Regional Market. The connection with the P&W was placed out of service in 2008, and restored to active use in 2019.

A Connecticut Southern freight train at Wallingford station in 2018

==== East Windsor Secondary and Armory Branch ====
This line travels between East Hartford, where it diverges from the Highland Division, and the Massachusetts state line. The line between East Windsor Hill and the Massachusetts state line was previously operated by the Central New England Railroad until the end of 2025.

==== Highland Division ====
Connecticut Southern operates this line between Hartford and the end of track in Manchester, beyond which the right of way has been converted into the Hop River State Park Trail. This line formerly extended to Willimantic. CSO filed for abandonment of the final mile of this line in November 2021; the right-of-way was then purchased by the Connecticut Department of Transportation to allow removal of a grade crossing as part of an intersection improvement project.
