= Hartford and New Haven Railroad =

Defunct railroad in Connecticut and Massachusetts

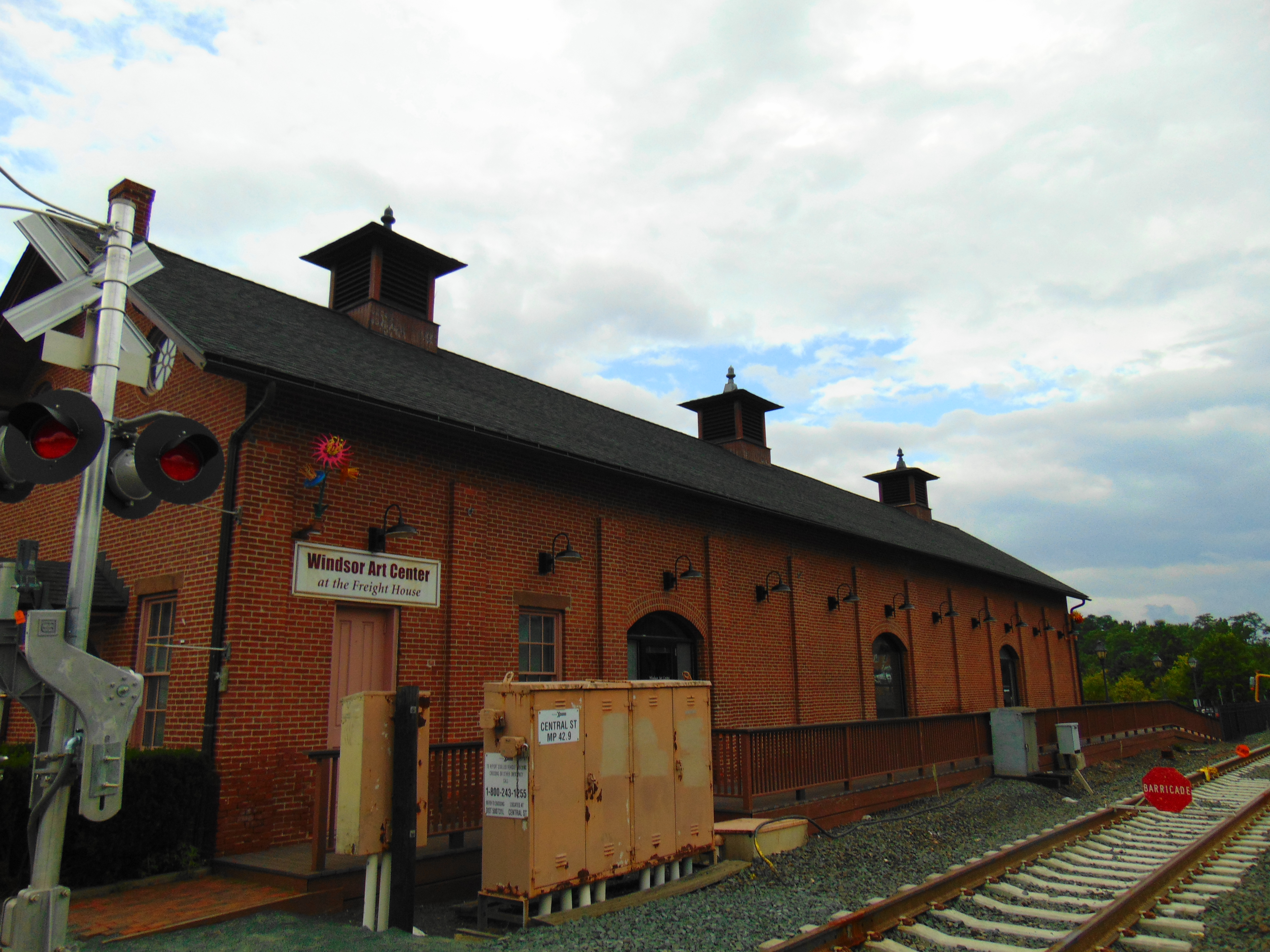
- Originally built by the Hartford and New Haven Railroad, the Windsor Freight House serves as the home of the Windsor Art Center today

Overview
- Operator: Amtrak; CT Rail; Connecticut Southern Railroad (freight); Pan Am Southern (overhead rights and Berlin-New Britain); CSX Transportation (overhead trackage rights); Providence and Worcester Railroad (Middletown only)
- Dates of operation: 1838–1872
- Successor: New York, New Haven and Hartford Railroad

Technical
- Track gauge: 4 ft 8 1/2 in (1,435 mm) standard gauge
- Length: 62 miles (100 km) (main line); 79 miles (127 km) (including branches)

The Hartford and New Haven Railroad (H&NH), chartered in 1833, was the first railroad built in the state of Connecticut and an important direct predecessor of the New York, New Haven and Hartford Railroad (the New Haven). The company was formed to connect the cities of New Haven, Connecticut, and Springfield, Massachusetts. It built northwards from New Haven, opening its first segment in 1838, and reaching Hartford in December 1839. The company reached Springfield in 1844 under the auspices of the Hartford and Springfield Railroad, a subsidiary chartered in Massachusetts. Branches were later built to Suffield, New Britain, and Middletown and operated by the Hartford and New Haven. The H&NH merged with the New York and New Haven Railroad in 1872, forming the New York, New Haven and Hartford Railroad.

The Hartford and New Haven Railroad's lines were merged into Penn Central Transportation Company with the rest of the bankrupt New Haven Railroad at the end of 1968; Penn Central itself went bankrupt and was merged into government-formed Conrail in 1976. At that time, Amtrak purchased the main line for passenger operations as its New Haven–Springfield Line, with Conrail handling freight operations and the various branches. Conrail sold its freight rights to the Connecticut Southern Railroad in 1996. Following track improvements and construction in the 2010s, in 2018 enhanced commuter rail service commenced, operated jointly by Amtrak and CT Rail.

== History ==
=== Formation and planning ===
One of the earliest ideas for a railroad in Connecticut was a line connecting the state's then alternating capitals of Hartford and New Haven. These cities were connected over land by horse-drawn carriages and wagons along the privately owned Hartford and New Haven Turnpike; the only alternative was water travel along the Connecticut River via Old Saybrook, more than 20 miles (32 km) east of New Haven. Significant potential existed in linking inland cities to Long Island Sound, as much of the freight and passenger traffic in the state was headed to or from New York City, itself best reached by ship from ports on the Sound. The construction of early railroads in Massachusetts in an east-west direction north of the Connecticut state line opened a potential route for traffic between New York City and Boston, should a new railroad connect these railroads to a Connecticut port. Despite fierce opposition by the Turnpike company, the Hartford and New Haven Railroad was chartered by the Connecticut General Assembly in 1833 to build a railroad between the two cities. It was one of the earliest railroads built in Connecticut, and was intended both to improve New Haven's access to the interior of the state, and to provide an alternative to ship transport along the Connecticut River, which froze during the winter. The Hartford and New Haven Railroad formally organized in 1834.

The railroad's leadership considered it a crucial matter to study other pioneering railroad lines before building their own. A delegation paid visits to the pioneering Camden and Amboy Railroad in New Jersey, the Baltimore and Ohio Railroad in Baltimore, and the Baldwin Locomotive Works in Philadelphia, among others, making contacts with key railroad leaders at each stop. The delegation, led by New Haven businessman and key organizer of the railroad James Brewster, returned to Connecticut and reported their findings in July 1836. Based on the delegation's findings, a comprehensive plan to build the railroad was assembled. Key aspects were to obtain contracts for supply of lumber for construction, place orders for "three locomotives of proven design and known performance", plan for the internal construction of railroad cars and delegate an expert to determine if the company might also manufacture its own locomotives, identify and acquire land at both ends of the line for stations and associated railroad facilities, and send a representative to the United Kingdom to order and supervise the milling of iron for rails.

That fall, professor Alexander Catlin Twining was commissioned to survey the railroad's route; he and his survey crews identified three possible paths between the railroad's endpoints. The railroad could build either the western alignment through Plainville and New Britain, the central alignment via Meriden, or the eastern alignment via Middletown. Residents along all three routes clamored for the railroad to pass through their towns and cities, and Twining heard out proponents of each route while attending numerous town meetings on the subject. Newington alone expressed no interest in its "peaceable orderly people" being disrupted by steam trains. While each route had its merits, Twining opted for the central alignment due to its shorter length, favorable terrain for railroad construction, and the higher level of industrial and commercial development along the route, the opposition of Newington (located along the central alignment) notwithstanding. His final report quoted the cost of construction at $830,000 (equivalent to $23,770,000 in 2024) for the projected 36-mile (58 km) line.

Twining noted that while appreciable railroad traffic could be expected along the route, particularly when the river froze in the winter, there was a greater potential for longer distance traffic to and from Springfield, Massachusetts, and points further north along the Connecticut River Valley. A future extension to Springfield would be necessary to attract the largest portion of this traffic. At the other end of the line, steamships calling at New Haven could be expected to link the railroad with New York City via Long Island Sound.

The citizens of Middletown were unhappy about being bypassed, but they would have to wait for more than a decade before a branch line reached their city.

=== Construction ===
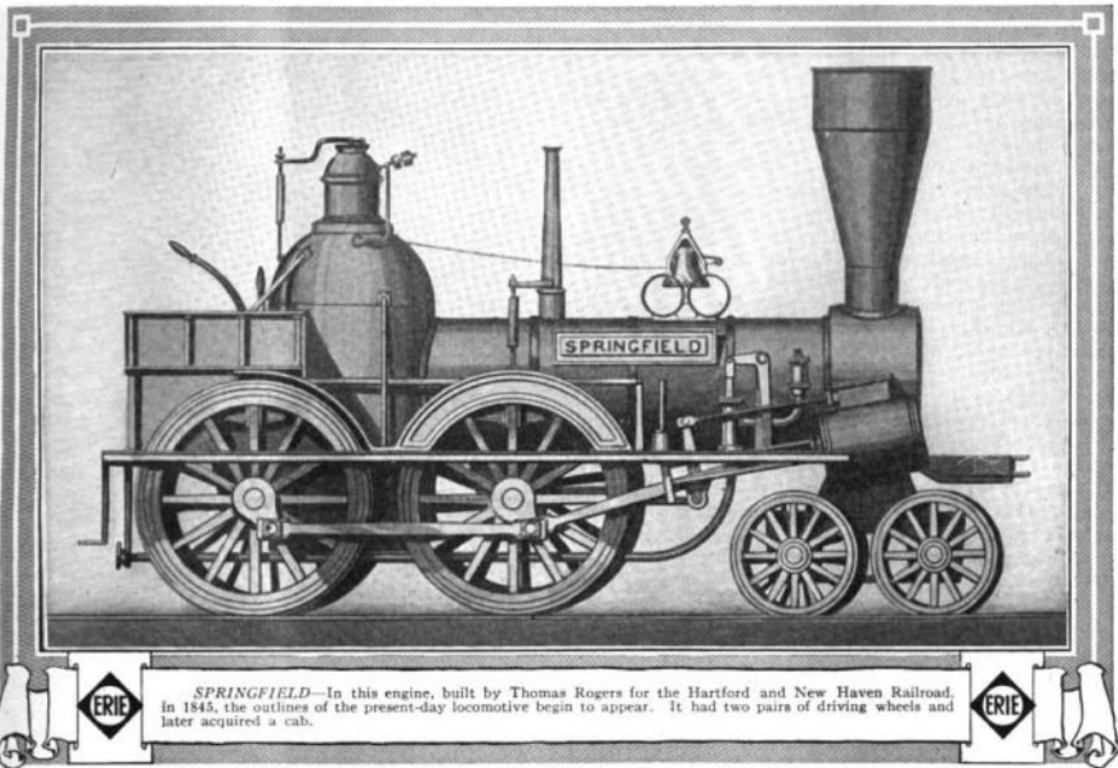
Springfield was built by Rogers Locomotive and Machine Works for the railroad in 1845

Construction started from New Haven to Meriden in 1836, with a temporary halt caused by the Panic of 1837. The financial crisis led to financing from both banks and stock subscriptions collapsing, and as the state had no interest in supporting the company financially, only the continued support of the main backers of the line (including Brewster, who also served as company president) prevented bankruptcy. The railroad opened this first segment, 18 miles (29 km) in length, in December 1838; the Panic of 1837 coincided with the originally planned completion date of 1837. Opening the railroad during winter conveniently meant that competing riverboats were kept in port by ice and brought a rush of early business. Initial construction used strap-iron rail (wooden rail with iron straps place on top for added strength) milled in the United Kingdom supported on yellow pine crossties imported from Georgia. The choice of strap-iron rail was a means of reducing construction costs, and Twining cautioned against its use. The following decade saw the strap-iron rail replaced with solid iron rail on the length of the line.

The railroad was completed to Hartford in December 1839. An agreement was signed with the New Haven and New York steamboat line to provide connecting steamboat service to New York City upon the railroad's opening. In the first year of operations, the company's directors voted to run a mail service on Sundays but prohibited carrying any passengers on the mail trains. That any trains ran on Sundays still subjected the railroad to public criticism. The State of Connecticut later passed blue laws outlawing the carrying of any passengers on Sundays, which were in force until near the end of the 1800s when passengers could finally travel by train on Sundays.

The locomotives Hartford, Quinnipiac, and Charter Oak were ordered from the Rogers Locomotive and Machine Works in New Jersey in time for the railroad's opening. The 4-2-0 (indicating two pairs of leading wheels and one pair of drive wheels) locomotives were spartan in design with no cabs for the train crew and fueled by wood; early passenger trains included two passenger cars behind the locomotive and tender. Two more locomotives were soon bought; New Haven from Rogers in 1840, and Meriden from Baldwin in 1841.

With the railroad's two namesake cities now connected, the company turned its attention northward to Springfield, Massachusetts. In that city, the Hartford and New Haven would be able to connect with the Western Railroad, which was building its own line from Boston to Springfield.

As the company's original charter only authorized a railroad between Hartford and New Haven, new charters from the states of Connecticut and Massachusetts were requested by the railroad company. On April 4, 1839, the Massachusetts legislature granted a charter for the Hartford and Springfield Railroad, which was authorized to build from the Connecticut border to Springfield. The new railroad company never operated independently, as it was simply a vehicle for the Hartford and New Haven to extend its line into Massachusetts. Construction began in 1842, and the first trains between Hartford and Springfield ran at the end of 1844. The complete route was 62 miles (100 km) in length.

=== Operations ===
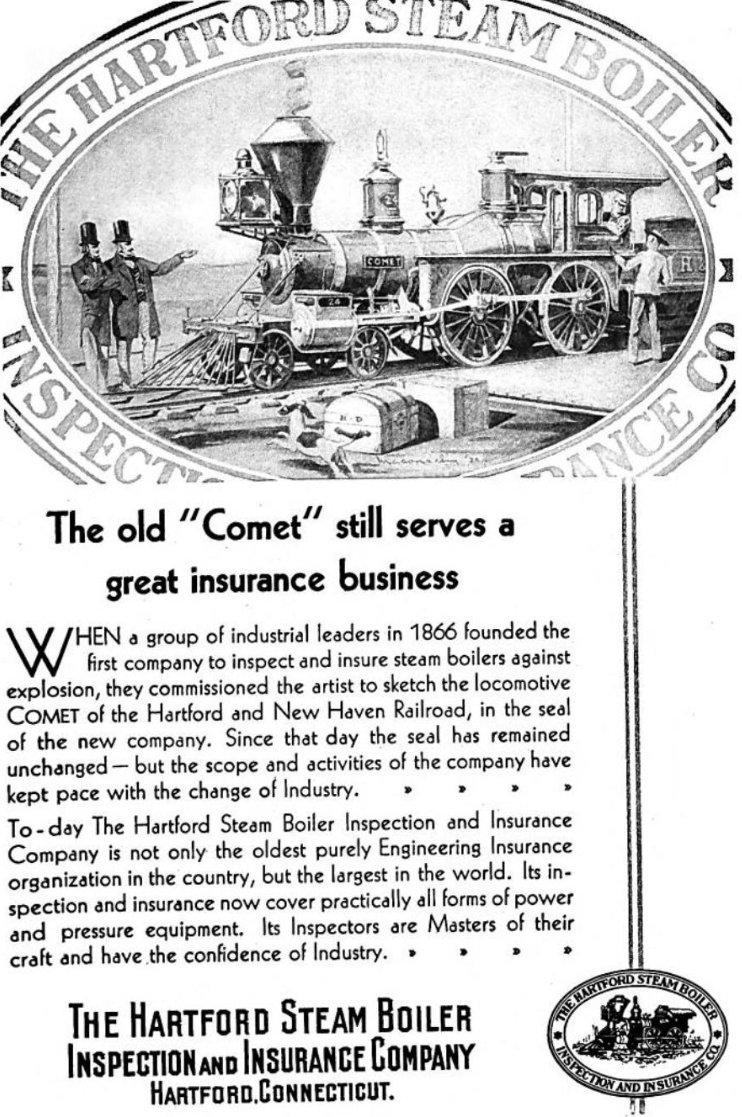
The Comet served as the logo of the Hartford Steam Boiler Inspection and Insurance Company for many years

In 1845, the Hartford and New Haven merged with the Hartford and Springfield Railroad to form the New Haven, Hartford and Springfield Railroad. The company reverted back to the Hartford and New Haven Railroad name in 1847.

The complete route between New Haven and Springfield resulted in a major increase in business for the railroad, which did not go unnoticed by its competitors. Furious at the loss of their former monopoly between Springfield, Hartford, and New York City, the Connecticut River Line began direct competition with the New Haven and New York steamboat line by running ships between Belle Dock and New York City. This succeeded in getting the latter company to capitulate and sell to the Connecticut River Line. Upon assuming the New Haven and New York line's contracts, the Connecticut River Line proceeded to fulfill them as poorly as possible by assigning their least capable steamboat to the service. This was matched with rate cuts on the steamboat line's own services. The anti-competitive campaign by the steamboat line backfired when the Hartford and New Haven Railroad sought and received from the General Assembly permission to operate their own steamboat service, which began by 1847.

The railroad was noted for the fast speed of its trains by 1848, when a Hartford and New Haven passenger train made the trip from Springfield to Hartford at an average speed of 50 miles per hour (80 km/h). The Hartford Weekly Times asserted that "This is the quickest trip ever made in this country with a heavy train over any railroad, and the road is now regularly run with greater speed than any other railroad in the United States, and with double the average velocity of railroads out of New England." The railroad's largely straight alignment, which followed natural topography and the Connecticut River, made this possible.

The New York and New Haven Railroad completed its line from New Haven to New York City along the Connecticut coastline in 1848. A key goal of this company was to attract New York-bound traffic presently departing from New Haven by boat. The Hartford and New Haven was initially unwilling to agree on sharing traffic, so the New York and New Haven leased the New Haven and Northampton Railroad, then under construction northward from New Haven. The threat of the New Haven and Northampton being completed parallel to the existing Hartford and New Haven main line succeeded in convincing the latter company to sign a traffic sharing agreement. Nearly all Hartford and New Haven trains then began stopping at the New York and New Haven's depot in New Haven to exchange passenger and freight traffic. New Haven Union Station, designed by Henry Austin, opened in New Haven in 1849 and served both railroads.

The Hartford, Providence and Fishkill Railroad opened between Hartford and Bristol in 1850, following the existing Hartford and New Haven Railroad alignment from Hartford south to Newington Junction, where a new station was established to serve both railroads.

By 1867, the railroad rostered 29 steam locomotives, employed over 700 workers, and had upgraded its main line to stronger 58-pound per yard iron rails. Work soon began on adding a second track from New Haven to Springfield along with a system-wide upgrade to stronger steel rails.

=== New York, New Haven and Hartford ===
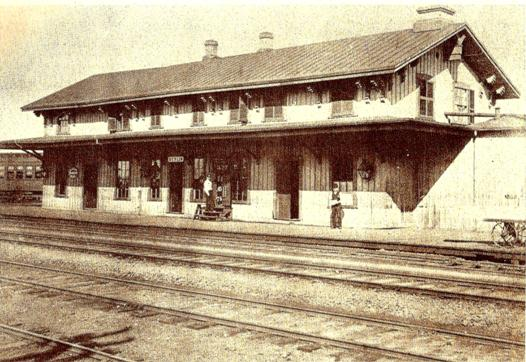
The 1848 built Hartford and New Haven train station in Berlin, Connecticut. This station was replaced by a more modern building in 1893.

The New York and New Haven Railroad's president wrote to the Hartford and New Haven Railroad on April 20, 1870, recommending that both companies form a joint committee to coordinate their operations. This paved the way for a merger between the two companies, which was competed in 1872, forming the New York, New Haven and Hartford Railroad (the New Haven). For the next 90 years, the route remained a vital passenger and freight route for the New Haven, with continuous passenger service even as most other lines in the region gradually had passenger service discontinued from the 1920s onward.

=== Penn Central and Amtrak purchase ===
The New Haven era came to an end in 1969, when the company was merged into the Penn Central Transportation Company. National passenger rail carrier Amtrak, formed in 1971, purchased the Hartford and New Haven route outright in 1976, becoming its New Haven–Springfield Line. Freight service passed to newly-formed Conrail that same year.

=== Conrail and Amtrak ===
From 1976 onwards, Amtrak maintained passenger service on the line, one of the few in the country it directly owned. Shuttle trains ran between New Haven and Springfield, and the line was also host to Amtrak's Bay State, a train between New York City and Boston via Springfield, as well as the Montrealer, travelling between New York City and Montreal. In the early 1990s, Amtrak elected to remove one of the two tracks on the line in a bid to reduce maintenance costs, a decision the company would come to regret in the 21st century when Connecticut and Massachusetts began a project to increase train service on the line.

=== Connecticut Southern and the Hartford Line ===
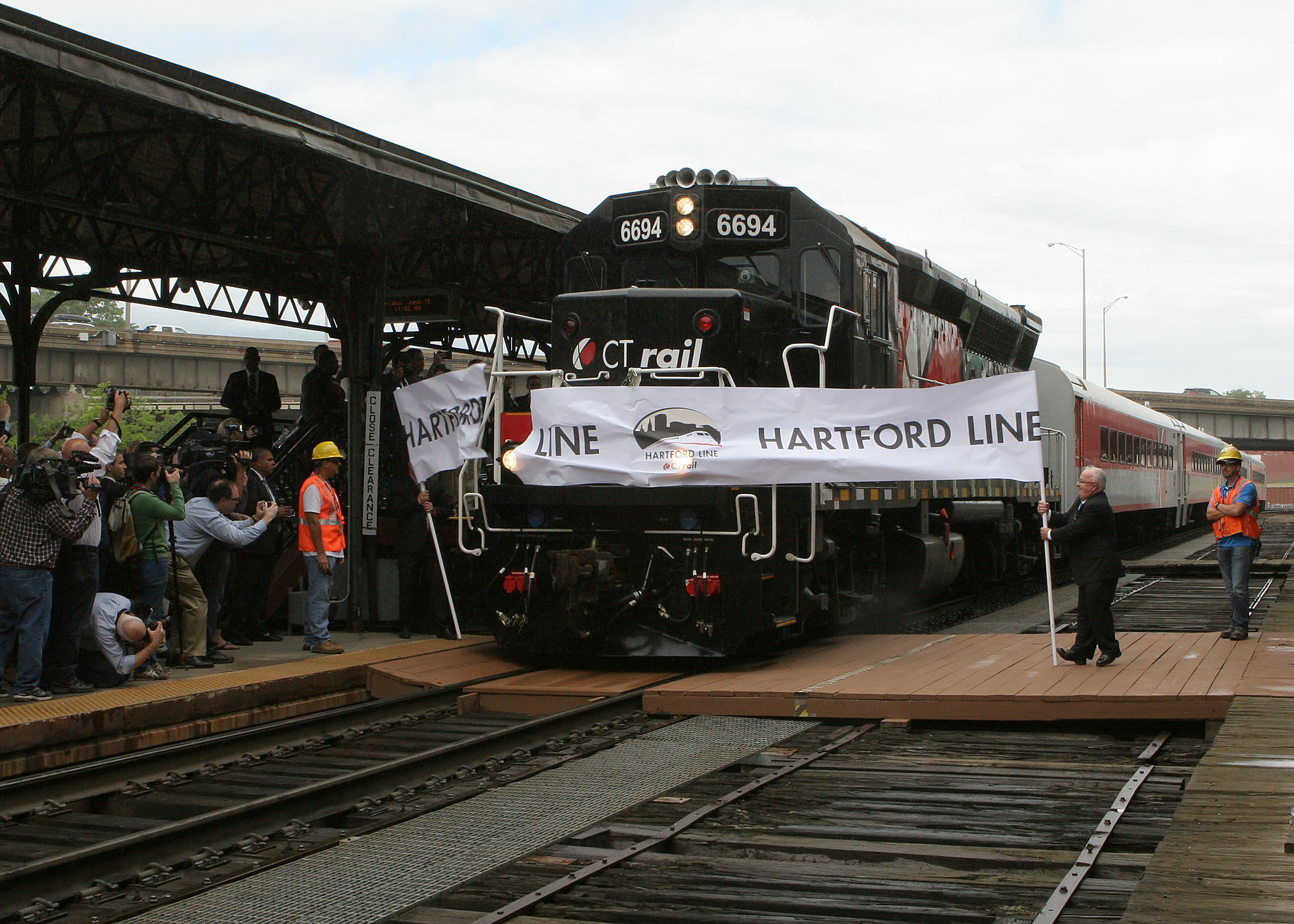
The Hartford Line began service in 2018

Conrail transferred its operations on the New Haven-Springfield line to shortline railroad startup Connecticut Southern Railroad in 1996. The new freight operator began to improve freight service on the line, reversing a general decline in business during Conrail's tenure.

By the mid to late 2000s, Connecticut and Massachusetts were both advocating for improvements and expansion of commuter service on the line, at that point consisting solely of Amtrak's New Haven-Springfield Shuttle, offering six trains each direction daily. Plans for expansion culminated in the Hartford Line, a joint project between both states to restore double track to the line and significantly increase passenger rail service. Construction on the project began in 2015, and it opened for service in 2018. After completion, service was increased to 29 trains a day, with 17 being a short turn between New Haven and Hartford.

== Branches ==
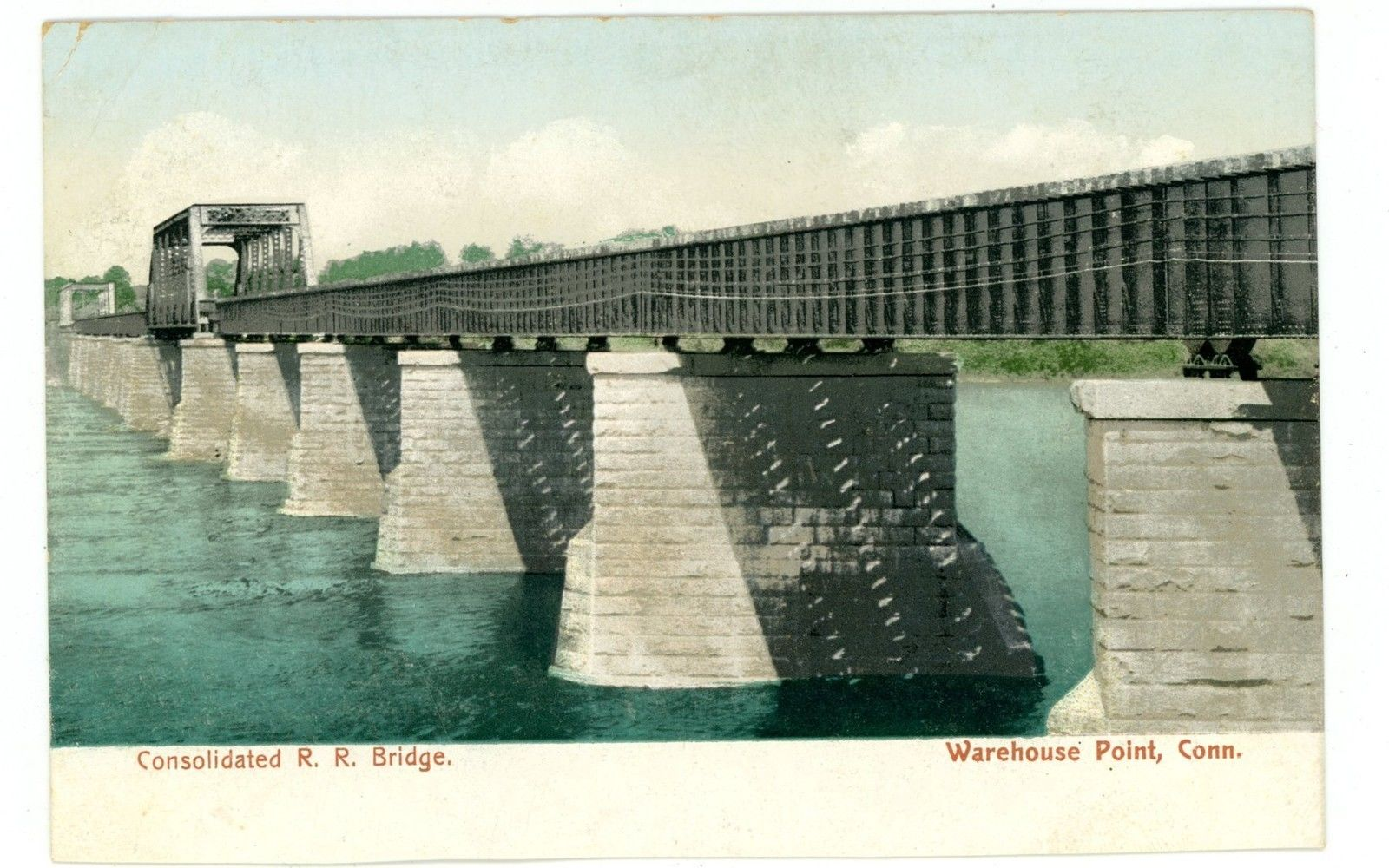
The Warehouse Point railroad bridge across the Connecticut River was completed by the H&NH in 1866. A rebuilt version of the bridge carries trains today.

In total, four branches were built off of the main line by other companies, all of which were quickly acquired by the Hartford and New Haven after completion. The addition of these branches brought the Hartford and New Haven's total mileage to 79 miles (127 km).

=== Middletown Railroad ===
Middletown was initially planned to be directly served by the Hartford and New Haven, but was bypassed. In 1844, a number of residents of the city took the matter into their own hands by forming the Middletown Railroad, which in 1848 built a 9 mile (14 km) long railroad line between Middletown and the Hartford and New Haven main line at Berlin. The Middletown Railroad was purchased by the Hartford and New Haven in 1850.

An extension of the Middletown Railroad, appropriately named the Middletown Extension Railroad, was chartered in 1857 to connect Middletown and the Connecticut River. The railroad was built in 1860, and merged into the Hartford and New Haven in 1861.

The Middletown Railroad was abandoned between Berlin and East Berlin in 1940, and from East Berlin to the outskirts of Middletown in 1961. Half a mile in Berlin and a mile in Middletown have remained in service for local industries.

=== Branch Company ===
In 1845, interests in Hartford formed the Branch Company, which built a short spur from the Hartford and New Haven main line in Hartford, to the banks of the Connecticut River. The Hartford and New Haven absorbed the Branch Company in 1850.

=== New Britain and Middletown Railroad ===
New Britain was another city bypassed by the original Hartford and New Haven main line. Much like in Middletown, in 1852 citizens there chartered the New Britain and Middletown Railroad, which built a 2 mile (3.2 km) long branch connecting their city to Berlin in 1865. This short railroad contracted out train operations to the Hartford and New Haven, before the latter company purchased it outright in 1868.

=== Windsor Locks and Suffield Railroad ===
Formed in 1868, the Windsor Locks and Suffield Railroad built a 5 mile (8 km) long branch between Suffield and the Hartford and New Haven main line at Windsor Locks in 1870. Upon the completion of construction and the railroad's opening on December 12, 1870, it was operated by the Hartford and New Haven, and was formally merged into that company in 1871.

== See also ==
- List of New York, New Haven and Hartford Railroad precursors
