= Hartford Yard =

Railroad yard in Hartford, Connecticut

Coordinates: 41.7781°N 72.6714°W

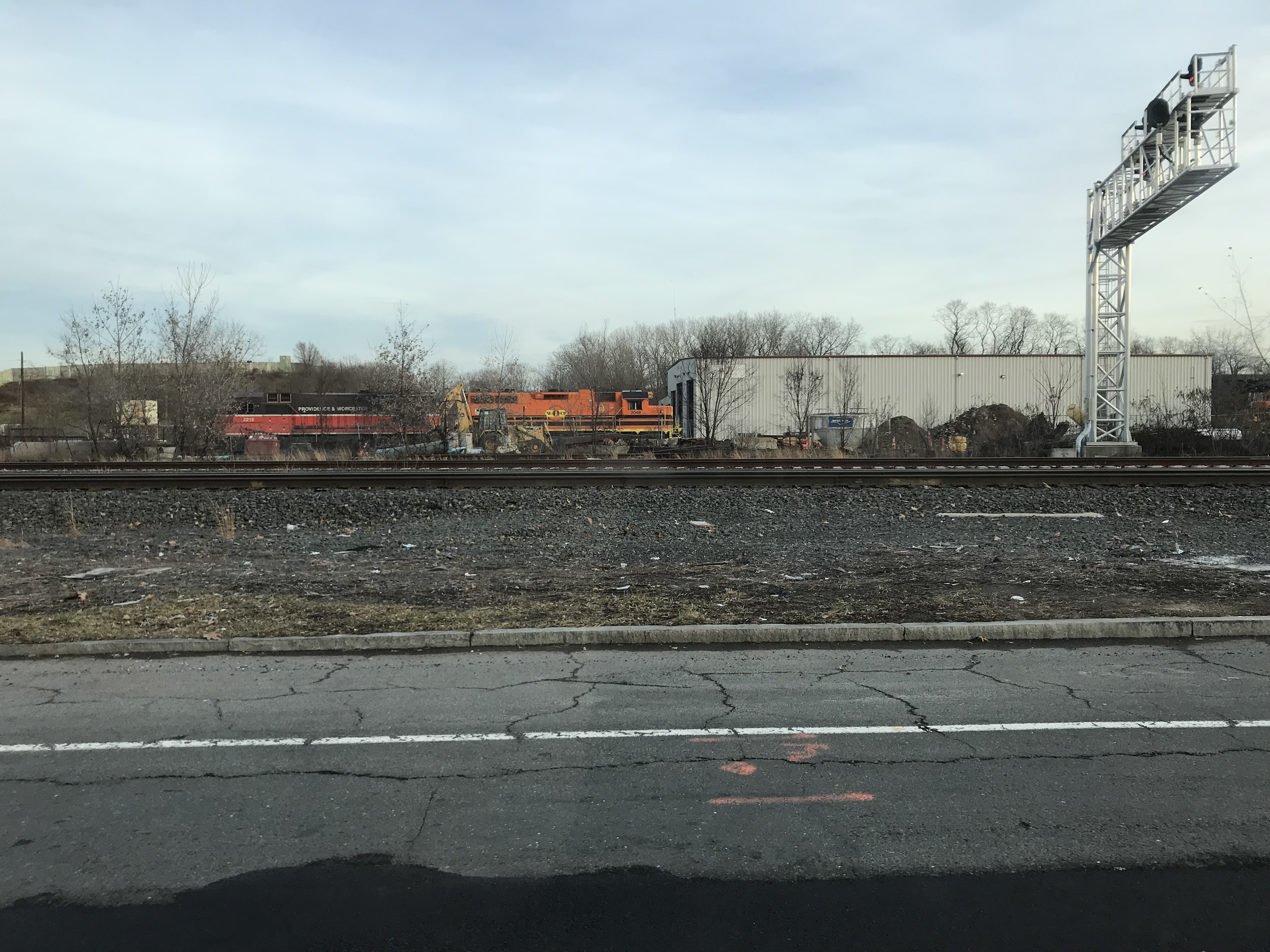
Locomotives parked near the motive power depot at Hartford Yard.

Hartford Yard is a classification yard located in Hartford, Connecticut. It was originally built by the New York, New Haven and Hartford Railroad. The yard was greatly expanded between 1925 and 1926 to alleviate congestion in the railroad's nearby East Hartford Yard, following the company's purchase in 1917 of 12.5 acres of land in Hartford's North End.

Since 1996, the yard has been owned by the Connecticut Southern Railroad, which maintains its headquarters there, along with repair and maintenance facilities.

A portion of the yard is now occupied by Dunkin' Donuts Park. The park's primary tenant, the Hartford Yard Goats, were named in part to honor the history of railroads in Hartford, and because the park is adjacent to the active portion of Hartford Yard.
