= Whistle-stop train tour =

Political campaign tour with multiple stops

A whistle stop or whistle-stop tour is a style of political campaigning where the politician makes a series of brief appearances or speeches at a number of small towns over a short period of time. Originally, whistle-stop appearances were made from the open platform of an observation car or a private railroad car.

== Definition and usage ==
The definition of the term derives from the practice of a small, occasionally used railway station signaling a train so the engineer will know to stop. Trains inbound to a "whistle stop" station would signal their approach with a blast of the train's steam whistle which would alert the train depot attendant to their arrival. If passengers, mail, or freight waited to be picked up at the depot, the depot master would raise a tower signal to indicate to the train engineer that the train should stop. If no stop was necessary, a different signal would be raised and the engineer could pass through the depot without stopping.

One usage of the term in the political context, by Robert A. Taft, was derisive. He accused then-President Harry S. Truman of "blackguarding Congress at whistle stops across the country".

== Background ==
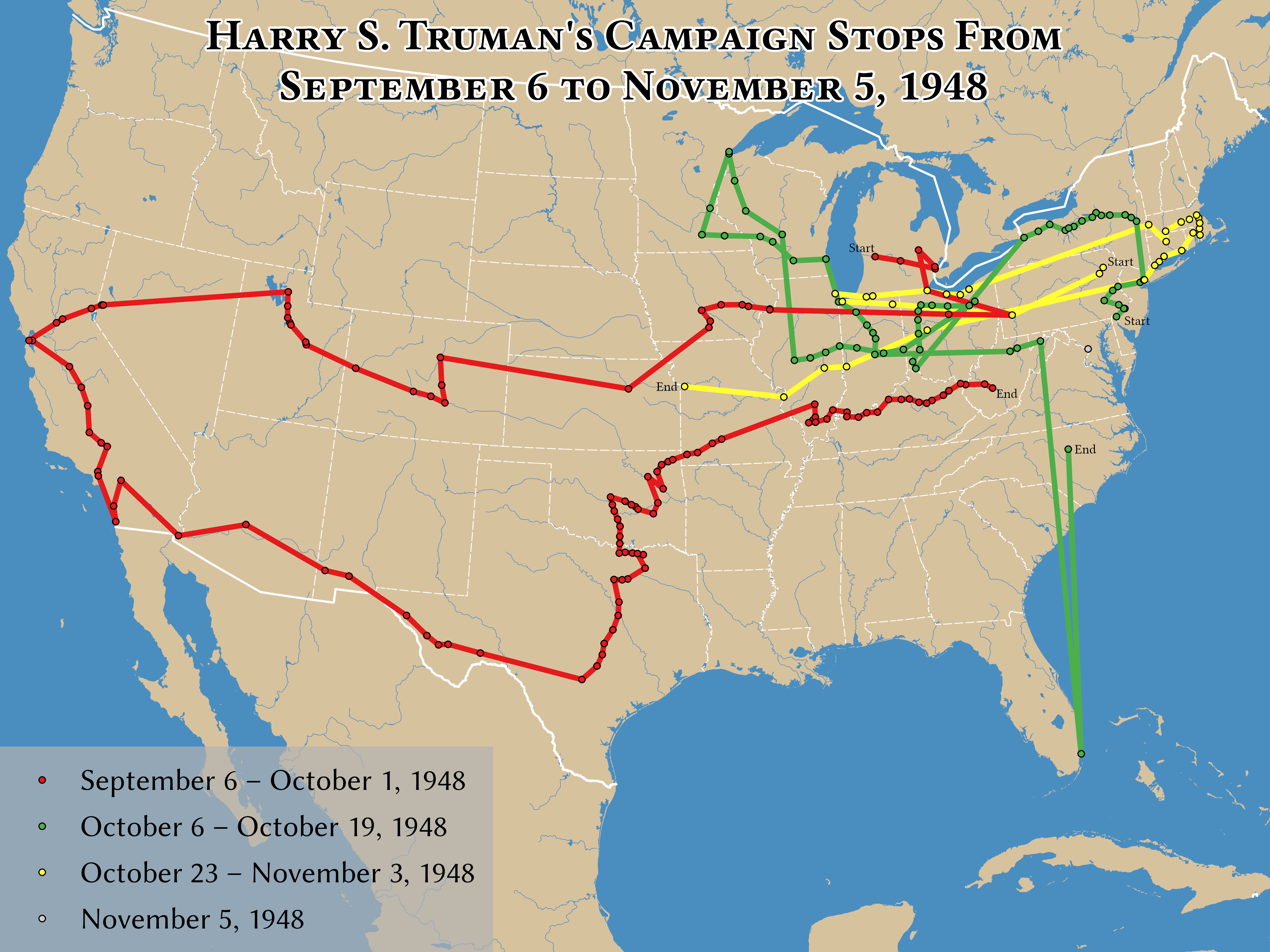
Map of Truman's 1948 whistle-stop tour from 6 September to 5 November 1948.

In the 19th century, when travel by railroad was the most common means of transport, politicians would charter tour trains which would travel from town to town. At each stop, the candidate would make a speech from the train, but might rarely set foot on the ground. "Whistle stop" campaign speeches would be made from the rear platform of a train. The Swing Around the Circle is a well known example of this in the 19th century.

One of the most famous railroad cars to be used in the U.S. whistle-stop tours was the Ferdinand Magellan, the only car specially outfitted for the President of the United States in the 20th century. Originally built in 1928 by the Pullman Company for general service, the Ferdinand Magellan is on display at the Gold Coast Railroad Museum in Miami, Florida. The famous news photo of Harry S Truman holding up a copy of the Chicago Tribune with a banner headline stating "Dewey Defeats Truman" was taken on this platform on Wednesday, 3 November 1948, at St. Louis Union Station. The Ferdinand Magellan was also used by President Franklin D. Roosevelt and, to a much lesser extent, by President Dwight Eisenhower. The Magellan's last official trip before retirement was in 1954, when first lady Mamie Eisenhower rode it from Washington, D.C., to Groton, Connecticut, to christen the world’s first nuclear-powered submarine, the USS Nautilus. President Ronald Reagan used the Magellan for one day, 12 October 1984, traveling 120 miles in Ohio, from Dayton to Perrysburg, making five stops to give "whistle stop" speeches along the way.

== Modern whistle-stop tours ==
Charles III of the United Kingdom started a five-day whistle-stop tour of the United Kingdom on Monday, 6 September 2010, with a speech in Glasgow when he was Prince of Wales. The green campaigning tour was a part of the Prince's Start initiative that aimed to build public awareness of sustainable activities.

In Europe, touring politicians still occasionally take a train, as the excellent, dense railway network offers access comparable to road travel and as it is better suited for extensive trips than air travel. In 2009, for example, German chancellor (and CDU candidate) Angela Merkel made a highly publicized tour in Konrad Adenauer's old campaign train. The SPD, on the other hand, discontinued the use of train tours for campaigns before the 1998 election.

On 30 September 2020, after the first presidential debate against Donald Trump, Democratic presidential nominee Joe Biden rode on an Amtrak "Build Back Better Express" from Cleveland, Ohio, to Johnstown, Pennsylvania.

== Gallery ==
The following are examples of whistle-stop train tours:

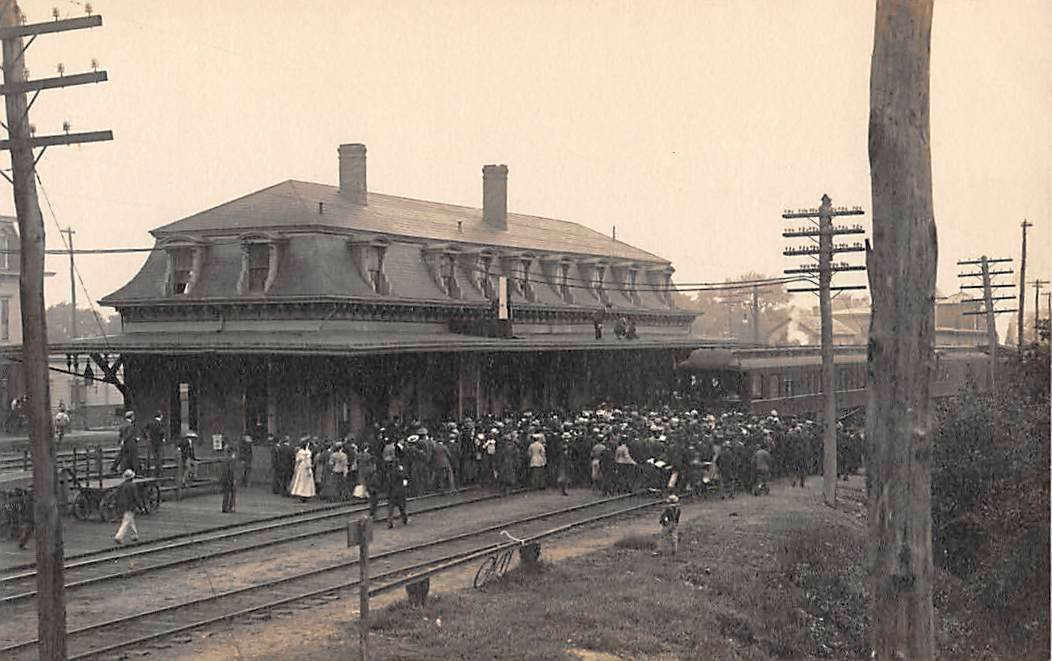
Early 20th-century photograph of a whistle-stop speech at the train station in Putnam, Connecticut

U.S. presidential campaigns

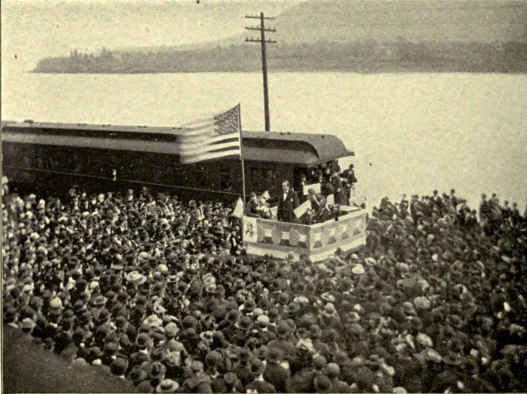
Democratic presidential nominee William Jennings Bryan delivers a whistle-stop speech in Wellsville, Ohio during his 1896 presidential campaign

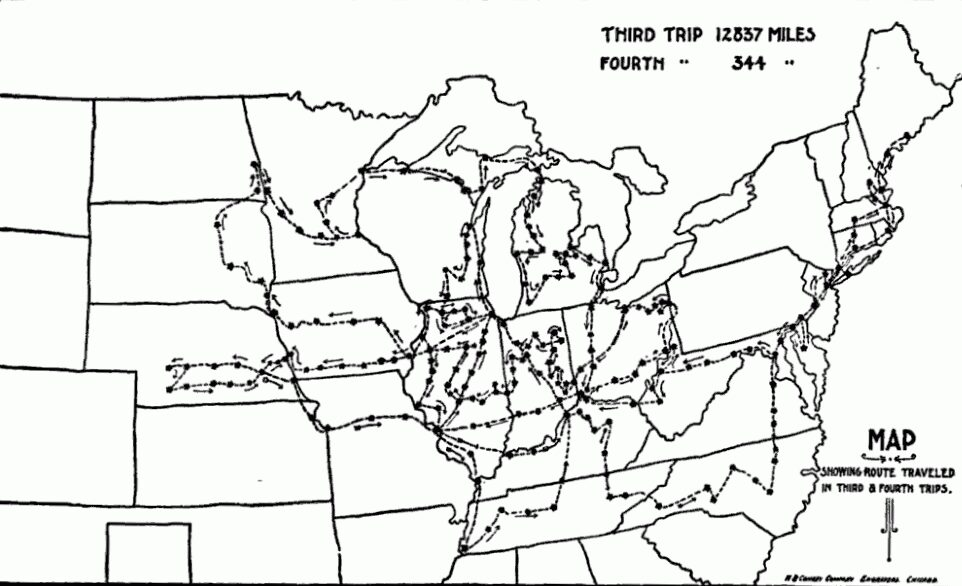
Map of Bryan's extensive 1896 whistle-stop travel

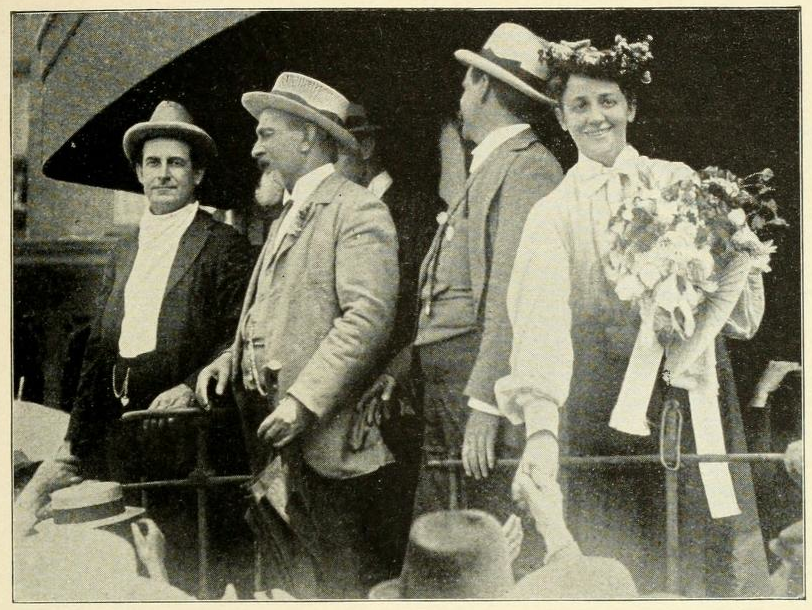
Bryan during a whistle stop appearance in Crestline, Ohio

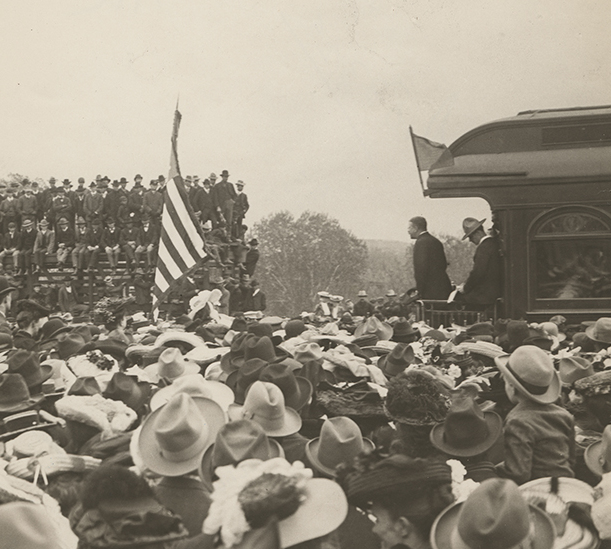
Republican vice presidential nominee Theodore Roosevelt on a whistle-stop during the 1900 presidential election

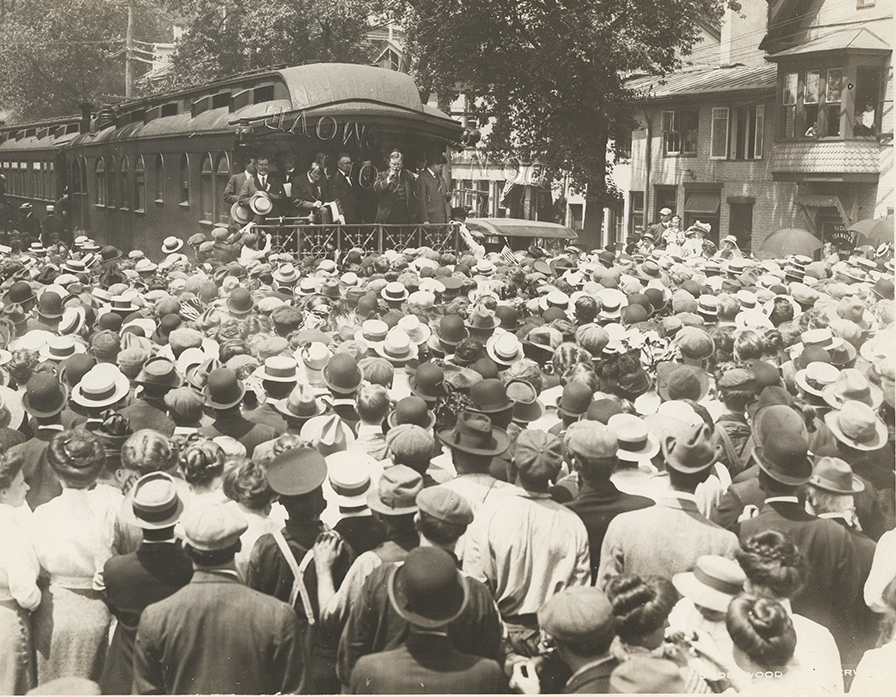
Former president Theodore Roosevelt delivers a whistle-stop speech during his third party campaign as the nominee of the "Bull Moose" Progressive Party in the 1912 presidential election

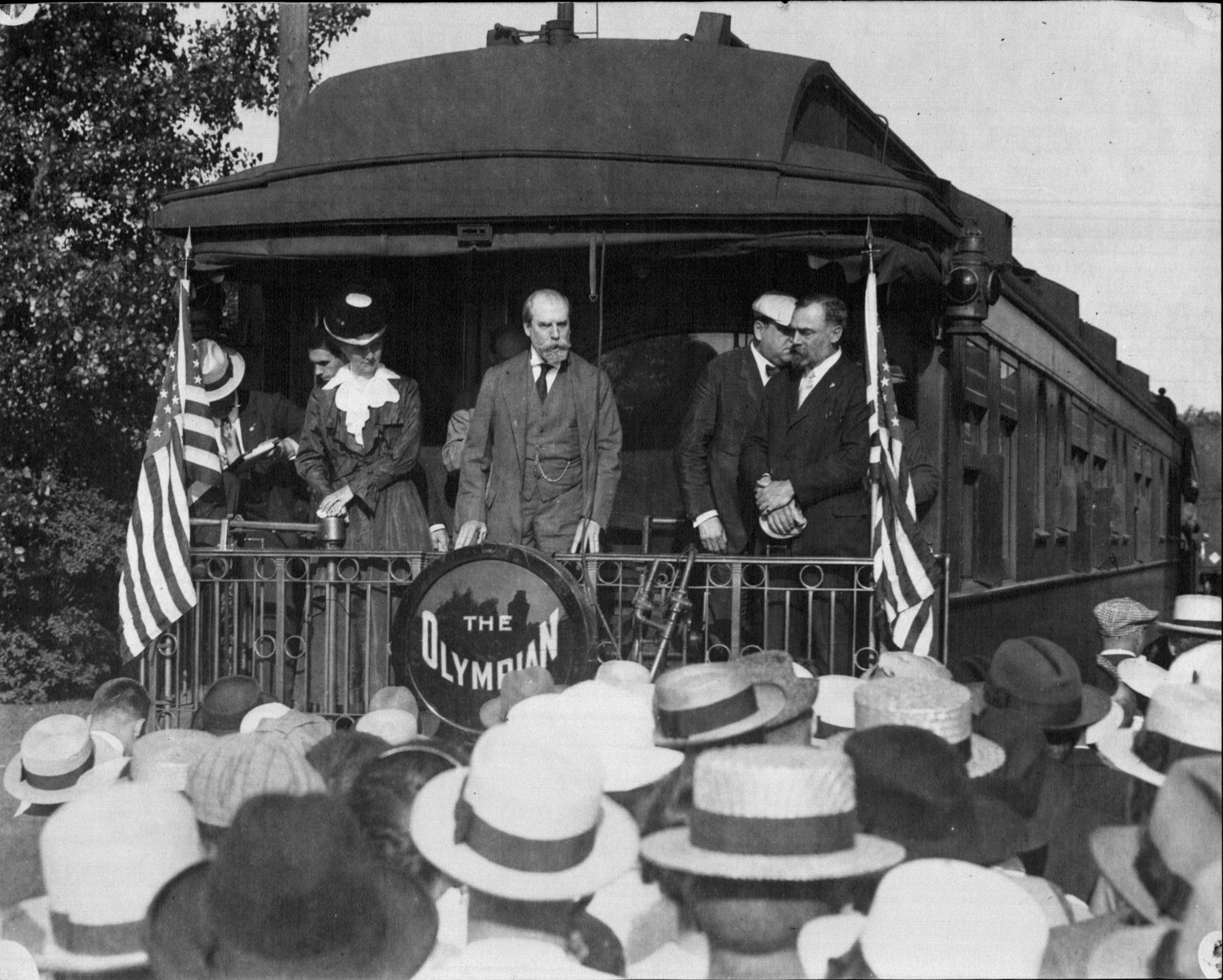
1916 Republican presidential nominee Charles Evans Hughes speaking at the train station in Winona, Minnesota while completing a whistle-stop tour on the Milwaukee Road's Olympian

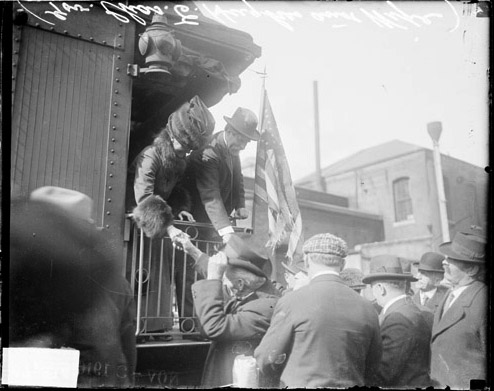
Charles Evans Hughes and his wife shake hands with supporters at Chicago's Union Station

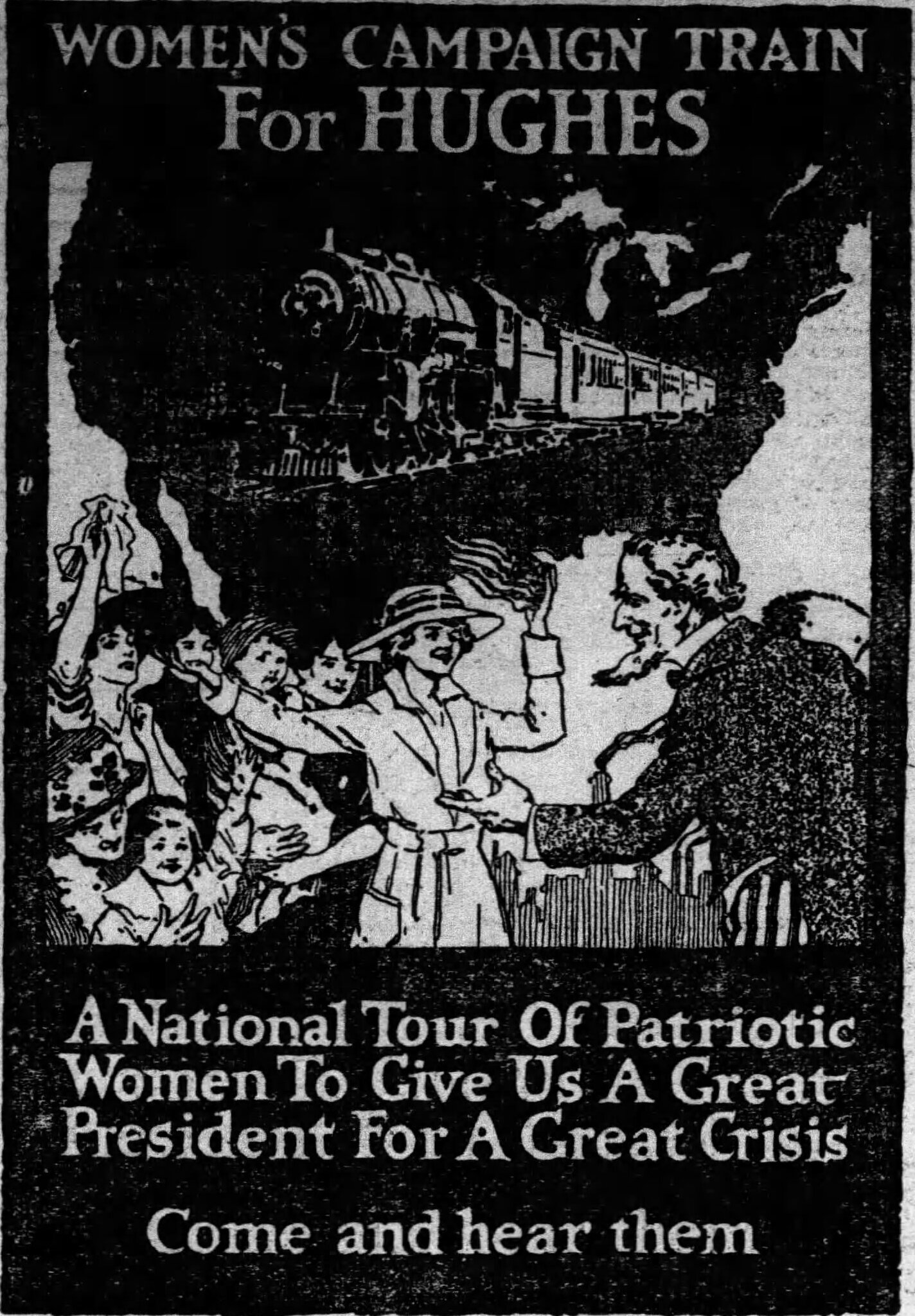
Promotional artwork for the Women's Campaign Train for Hughes, a whistle stop tour of prominent women speakers supporting Charles Hughes's 1916 presidential campaign

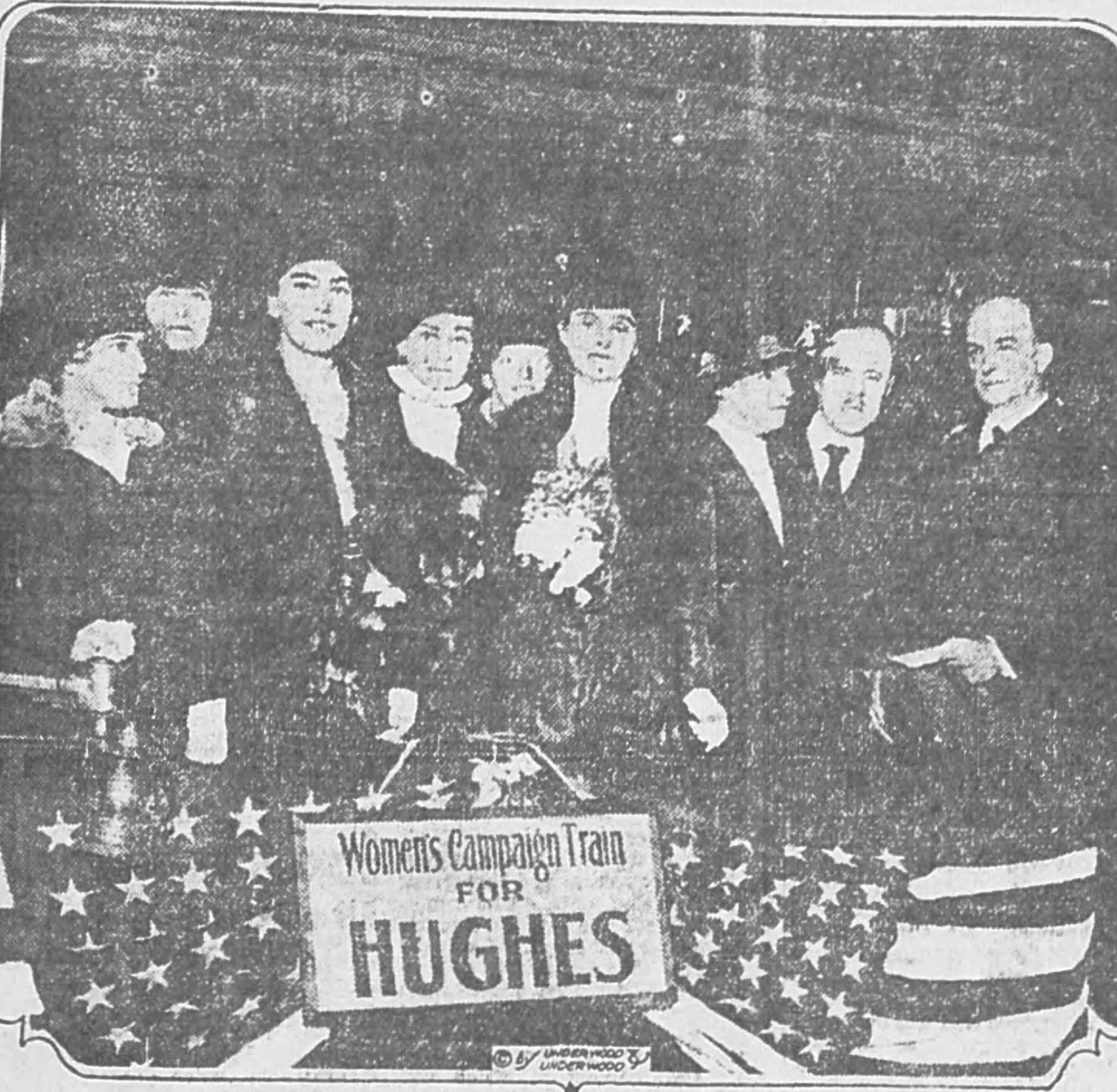
Photograph of the Women's Campaign Train for Hughes

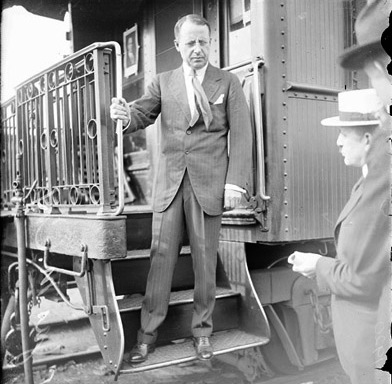
Democratic presidential nominee James M. Cox makes a whistle-stop appearance during his 1920 presidential campaign

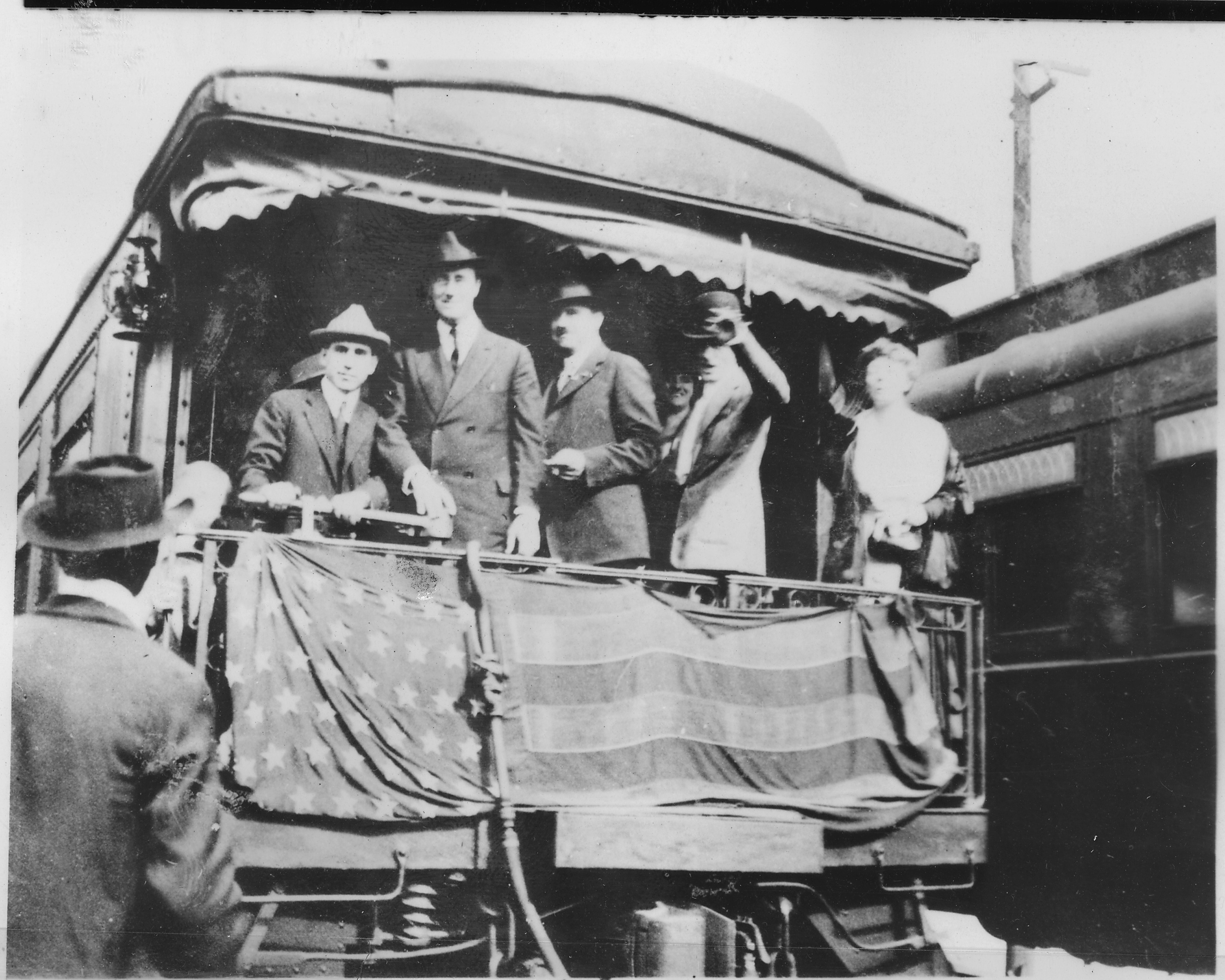
1920 Democratic vice-presidential nominee Franklin D. Roosevelt (second from left) at a whistle-stop appearance in Morgantown, West Virginia

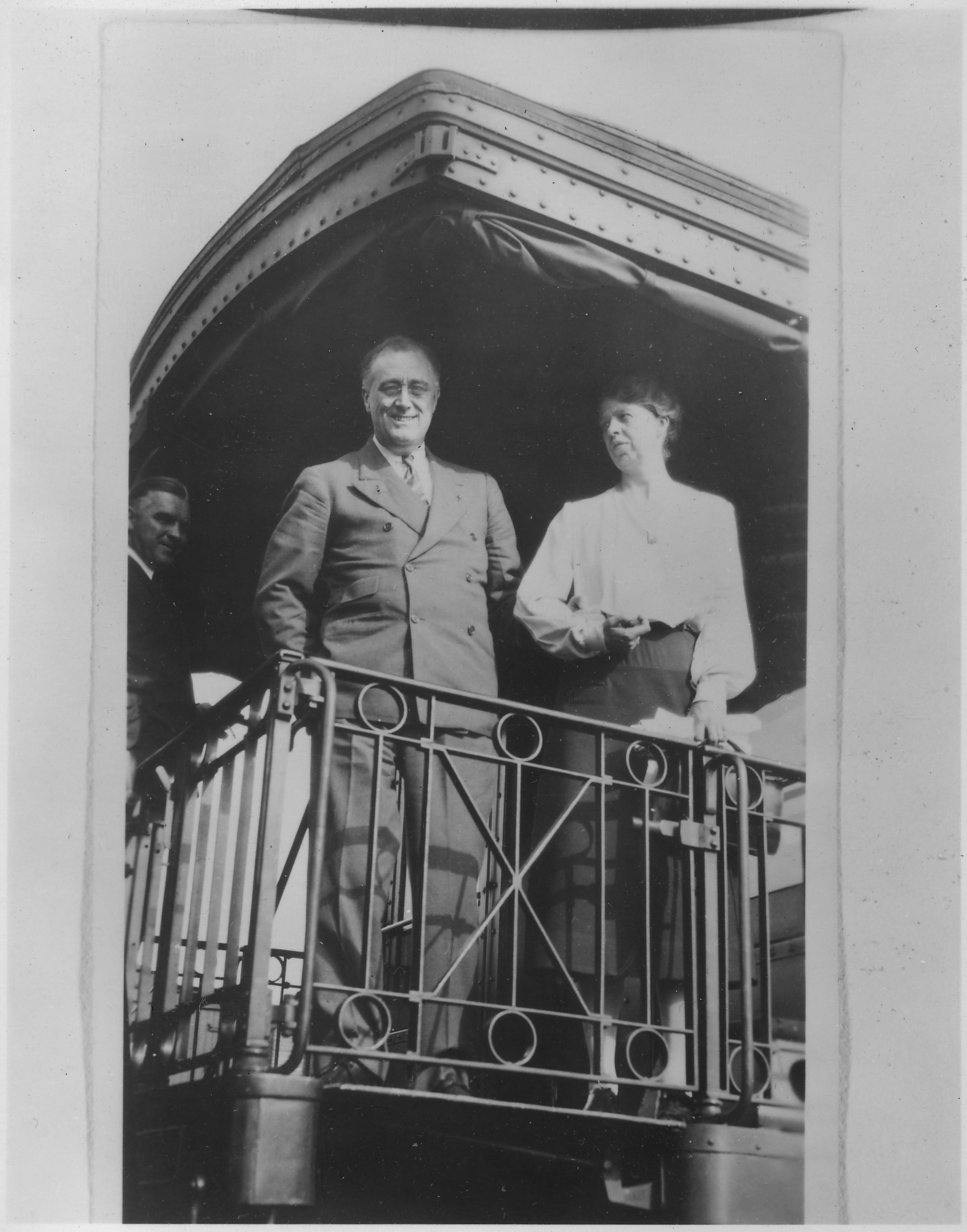
1932 Democratic presidential nominee Franklin D. Roosevelt and his wife Eleanor on a whistle-stop tour for his campaign

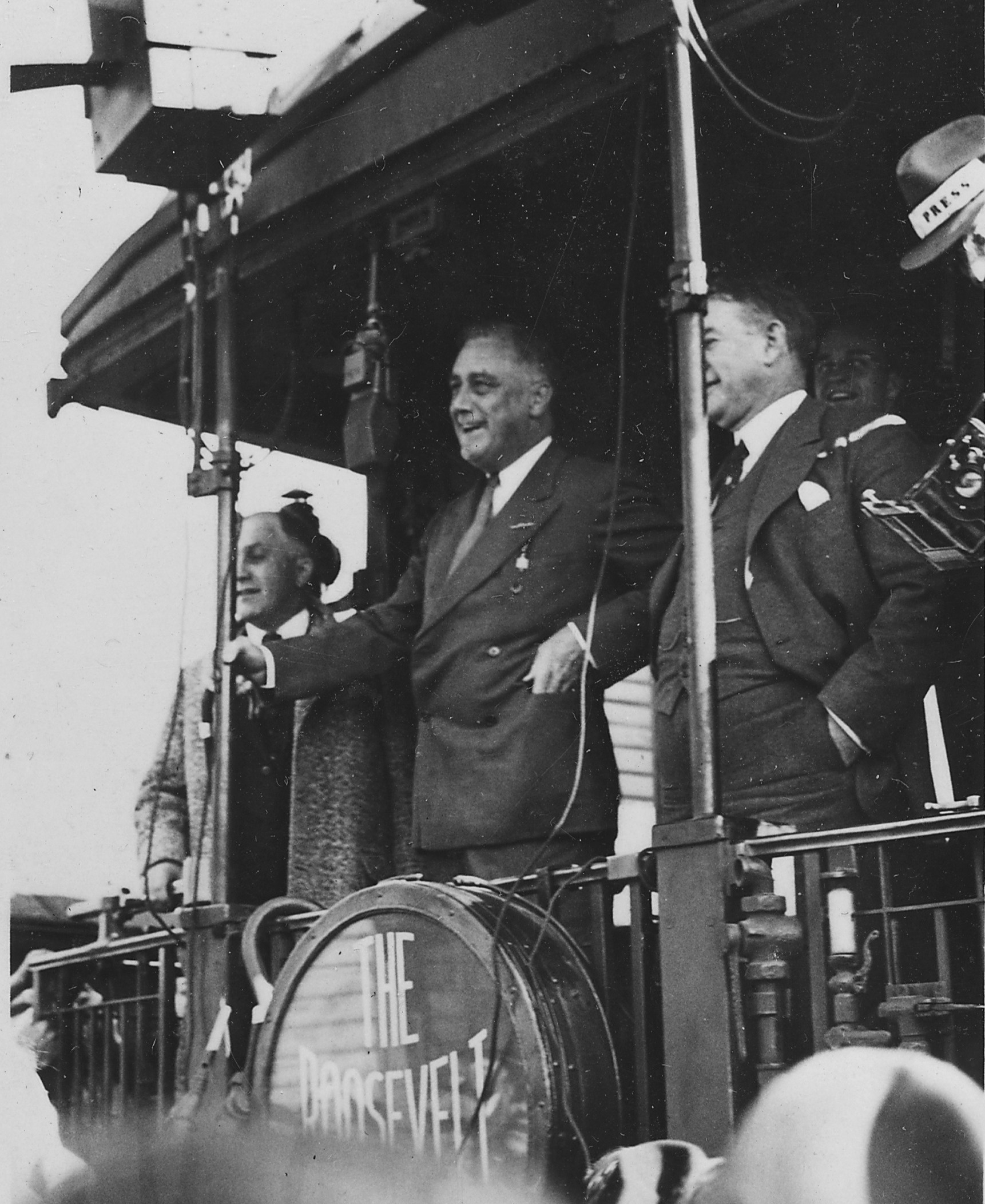
Franklin D. Roosevelt, accompanied by his son James, speaks at a 1932 whistle-stop appearance in Albany, Indiana

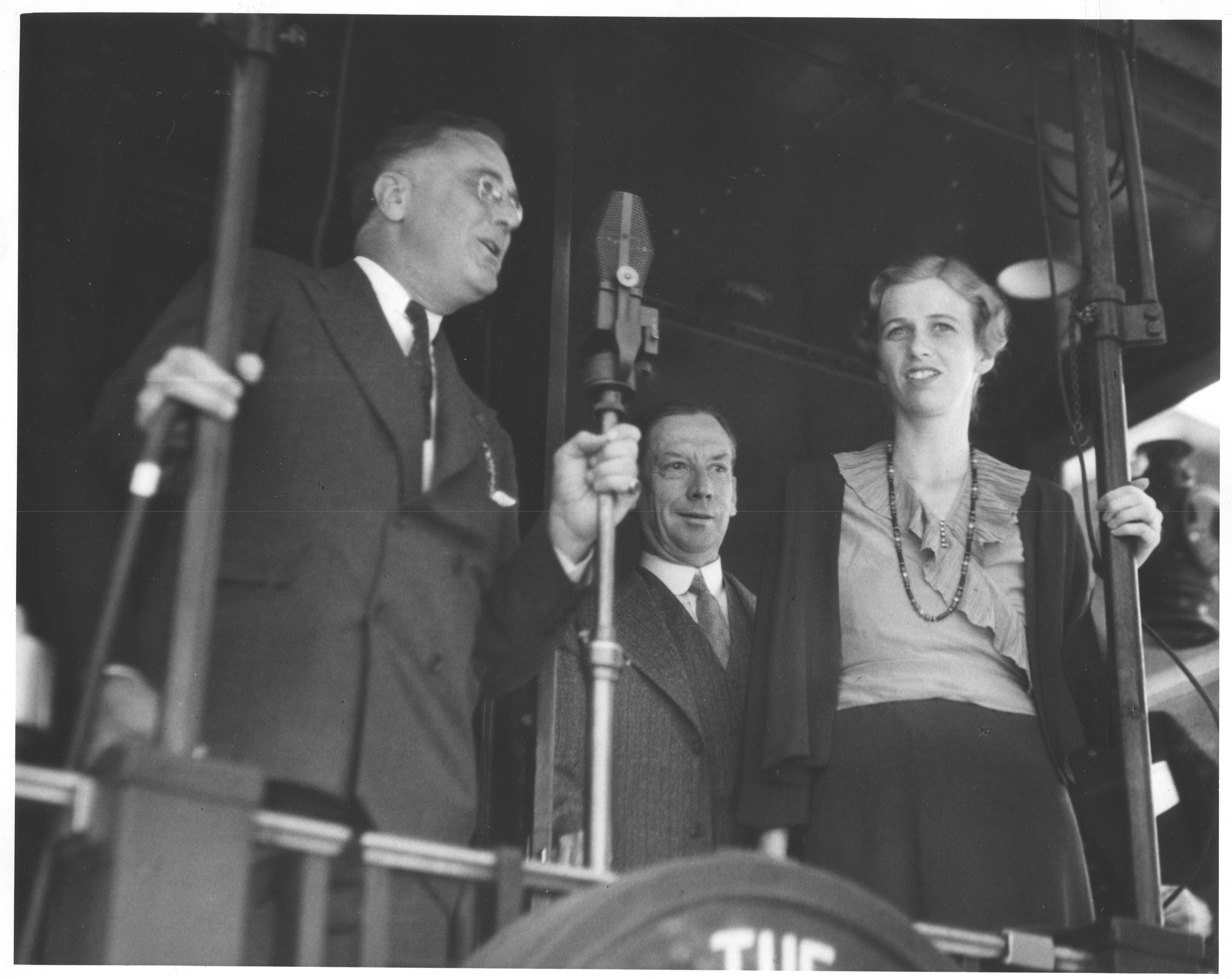
President Franklin D. Roosevelt, accompanied by First Lady Eleanor Roosevelt, speaks at a whistle-stop in Redding, California during his 1944 reelection campaign

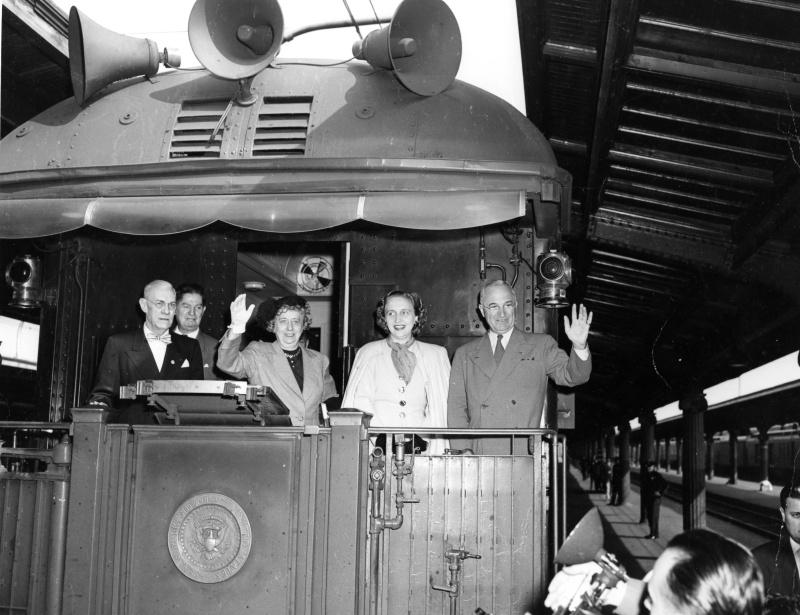
President Harry Truman (Democrat) and his family embark on a whistle-stop tour during his 1948 reelection campaign

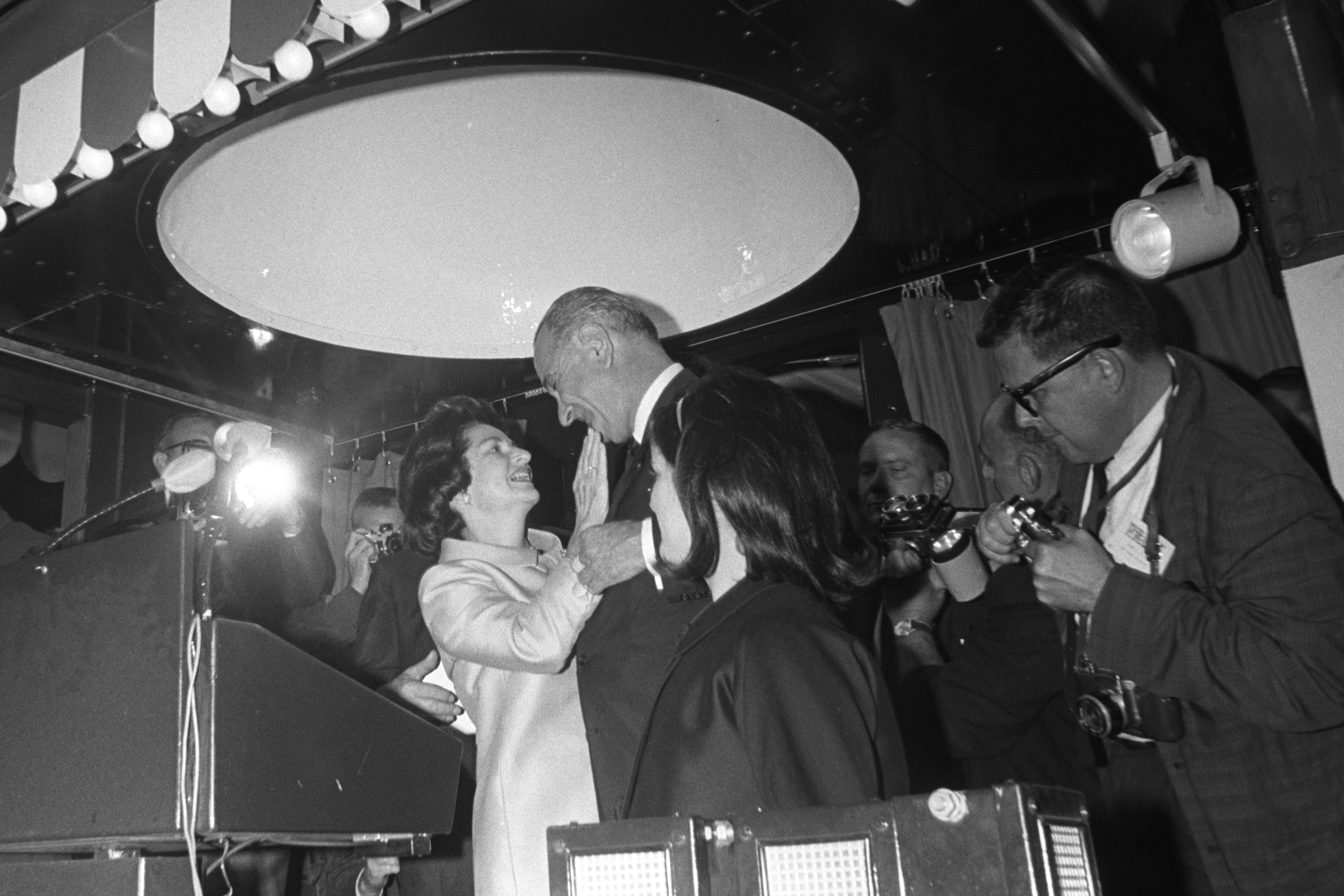
President Lyndon B. Johnson (Democrat) greets his wife, First Lady Lady Bird Johnson, in New Orleans at the end of a whistle-stop tour she conducted in support of his 1964 reelection campaign

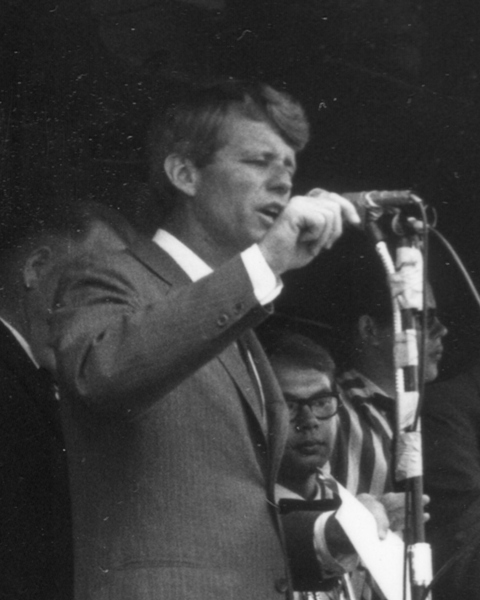
Democratic candidate Robert F. Kennedy speaks during a whistle-stop for his campaign in the Democratic primaries of the 1968 presidential election

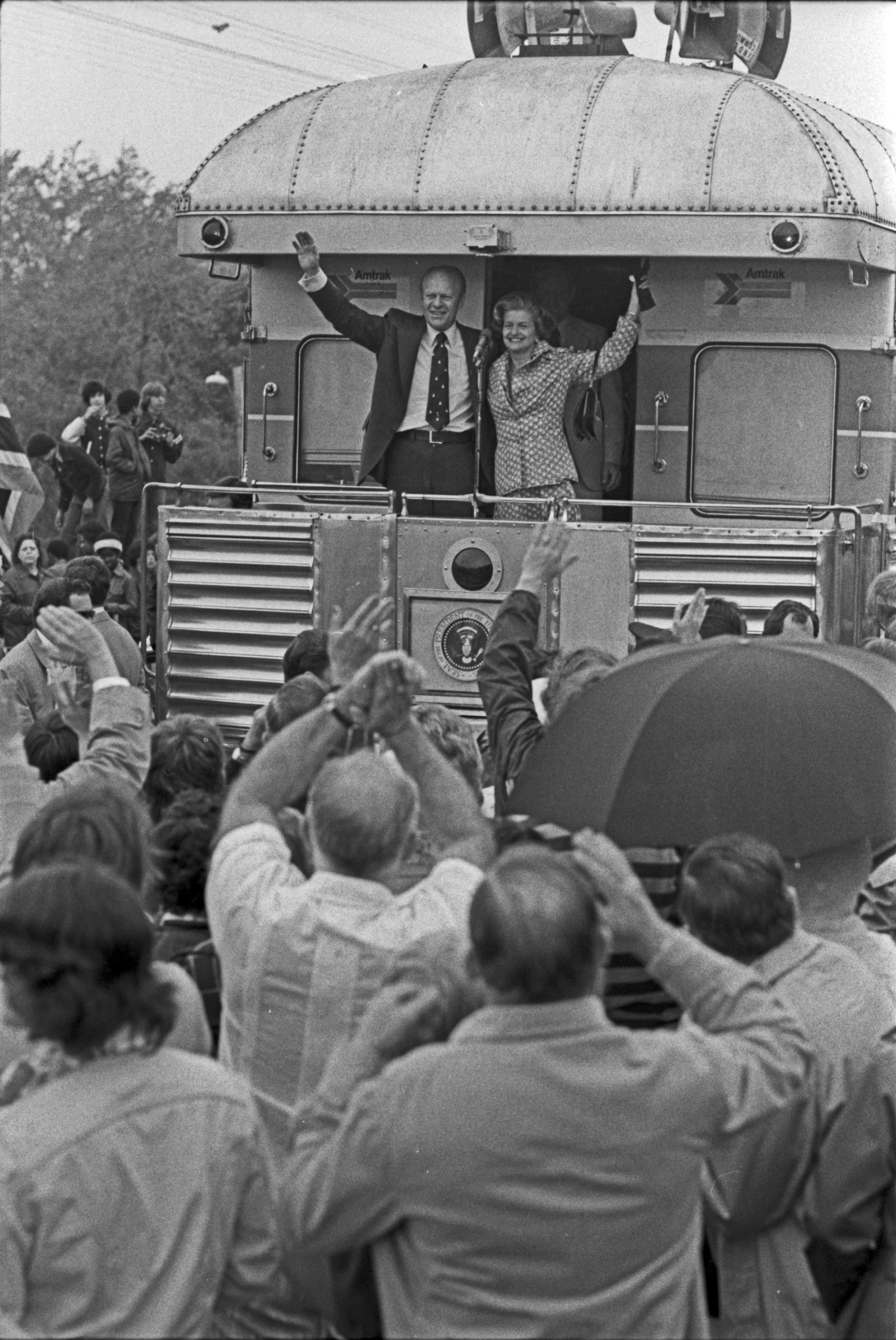
President Gerald Ford (Republican) and his wife Betty wave from a train during their whistle-stop tour of Michigan during his campaign in the Republican primaries of the 1976 presidential election

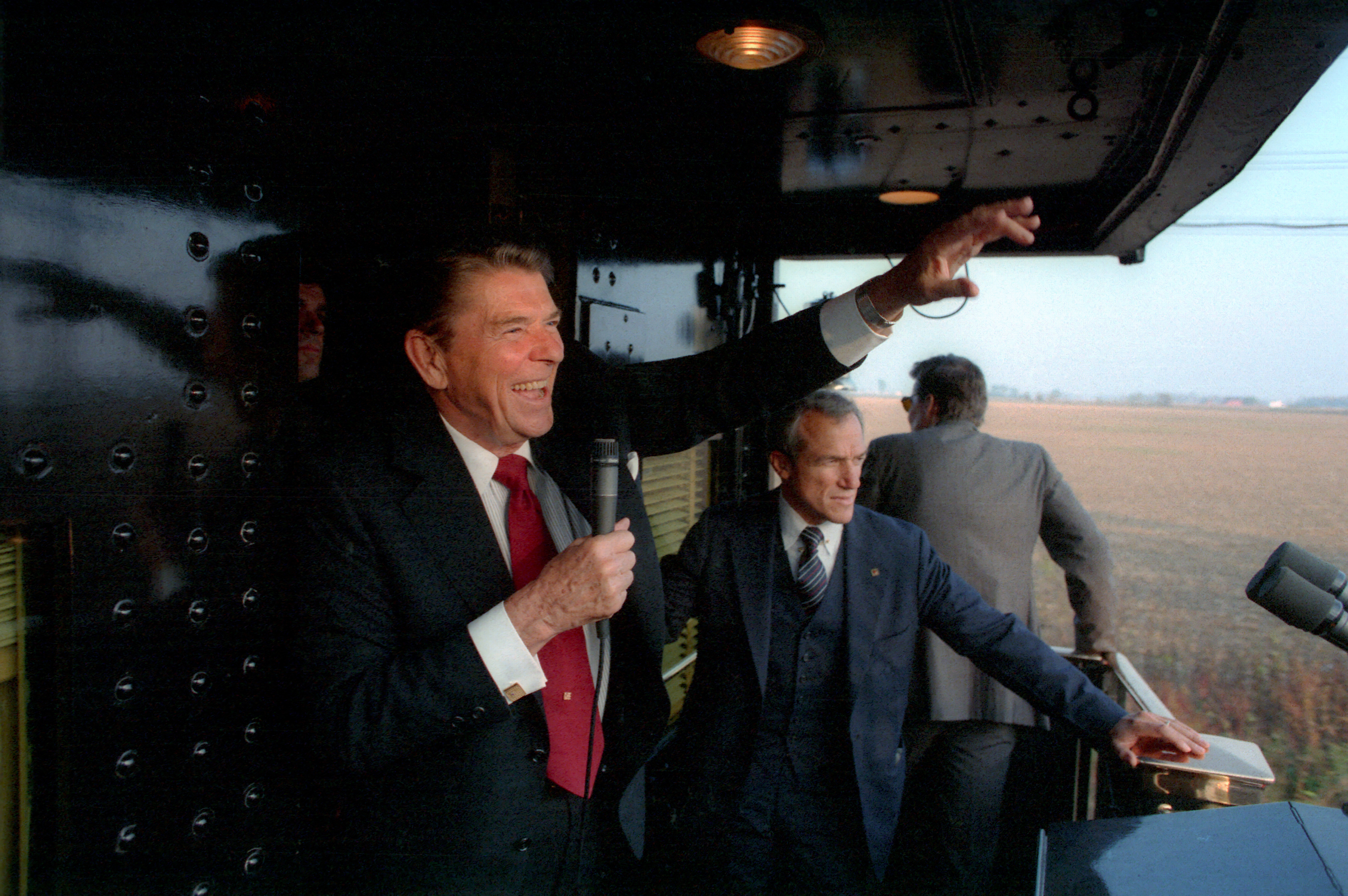
President Ronald Reagan (Republican) goes on a whistle-stop tour through Ohio for his 1984 reelection campaign

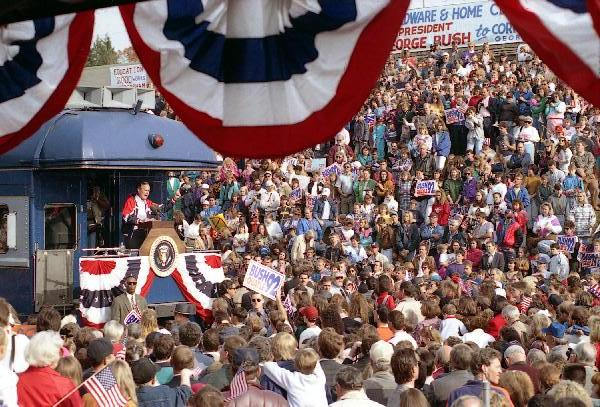
President George H. W. Bush (Republican) conducting a whistle-stop tour of Georgia during his 1992 reelection campaign

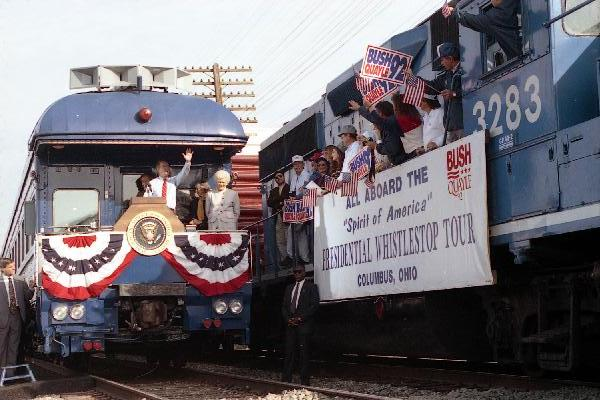
President George H. W. Bush and First Lady Barbara Bush making an appearance during their 1992 whistle-stop tour of Ohio

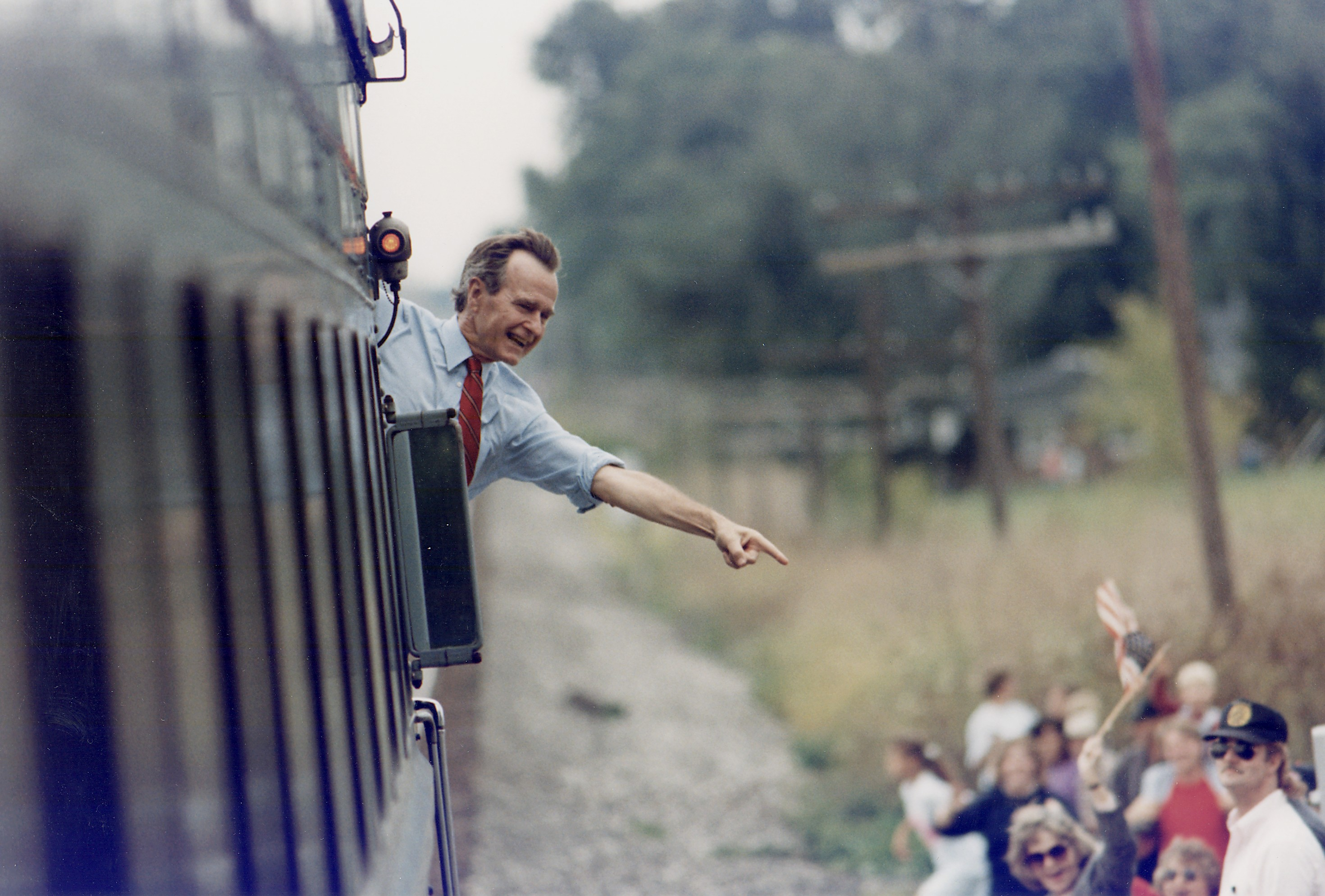
George H. W. Bush waves to spectators along the route of his 1992 reelection campaign whistle-stop tour of Ohio

Video of a whistle-stop appearance in Bowling Green, Ohio by President Bill Clinton (Democrat), accompanied by his daughter Chelsea, during his 1996 reelection campaign

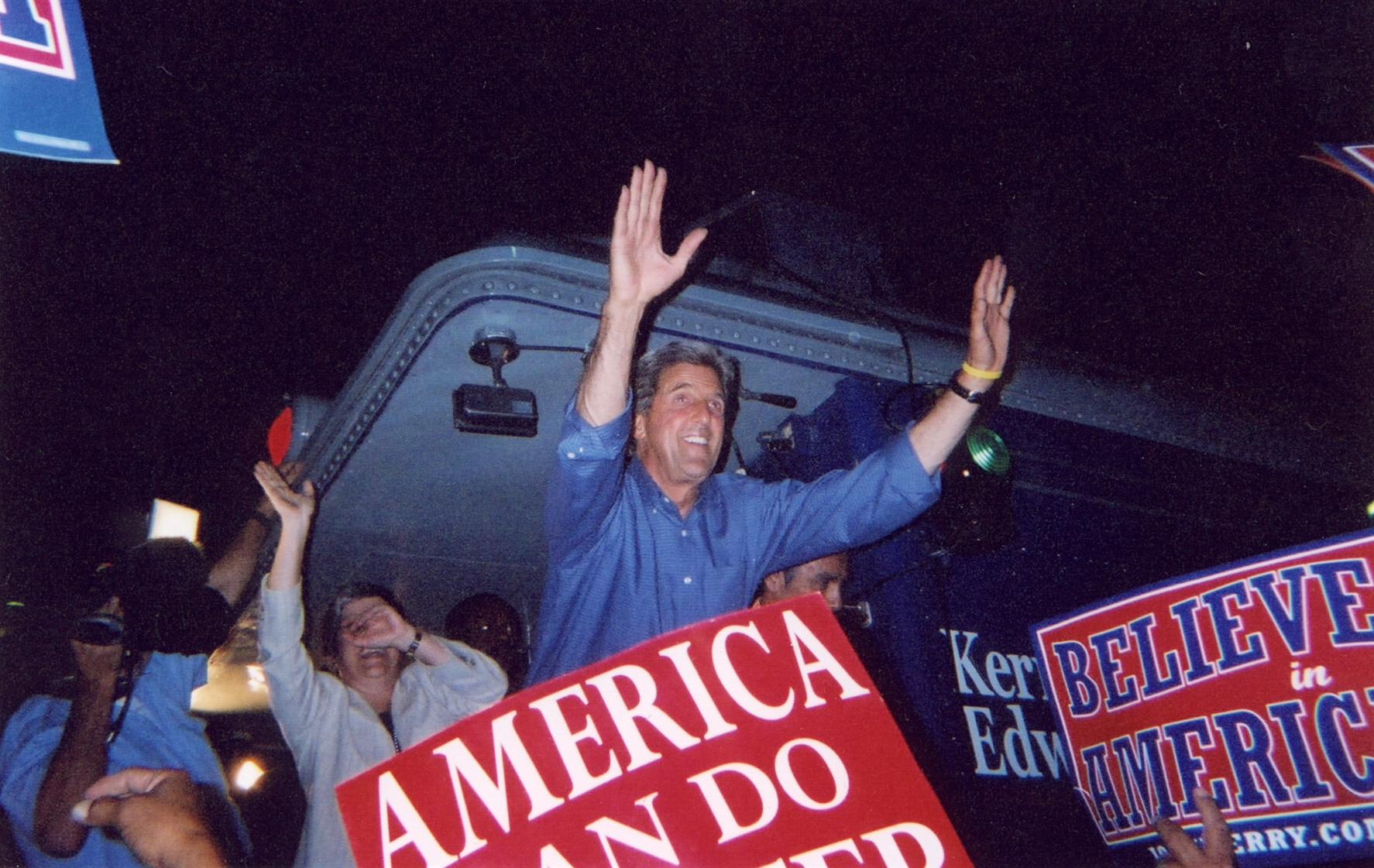
Democratic presidential nominee John Kerry on a whistle-stop tour during his 2004 presidential campaign

U.S. Senate and gubernatorial campaigns

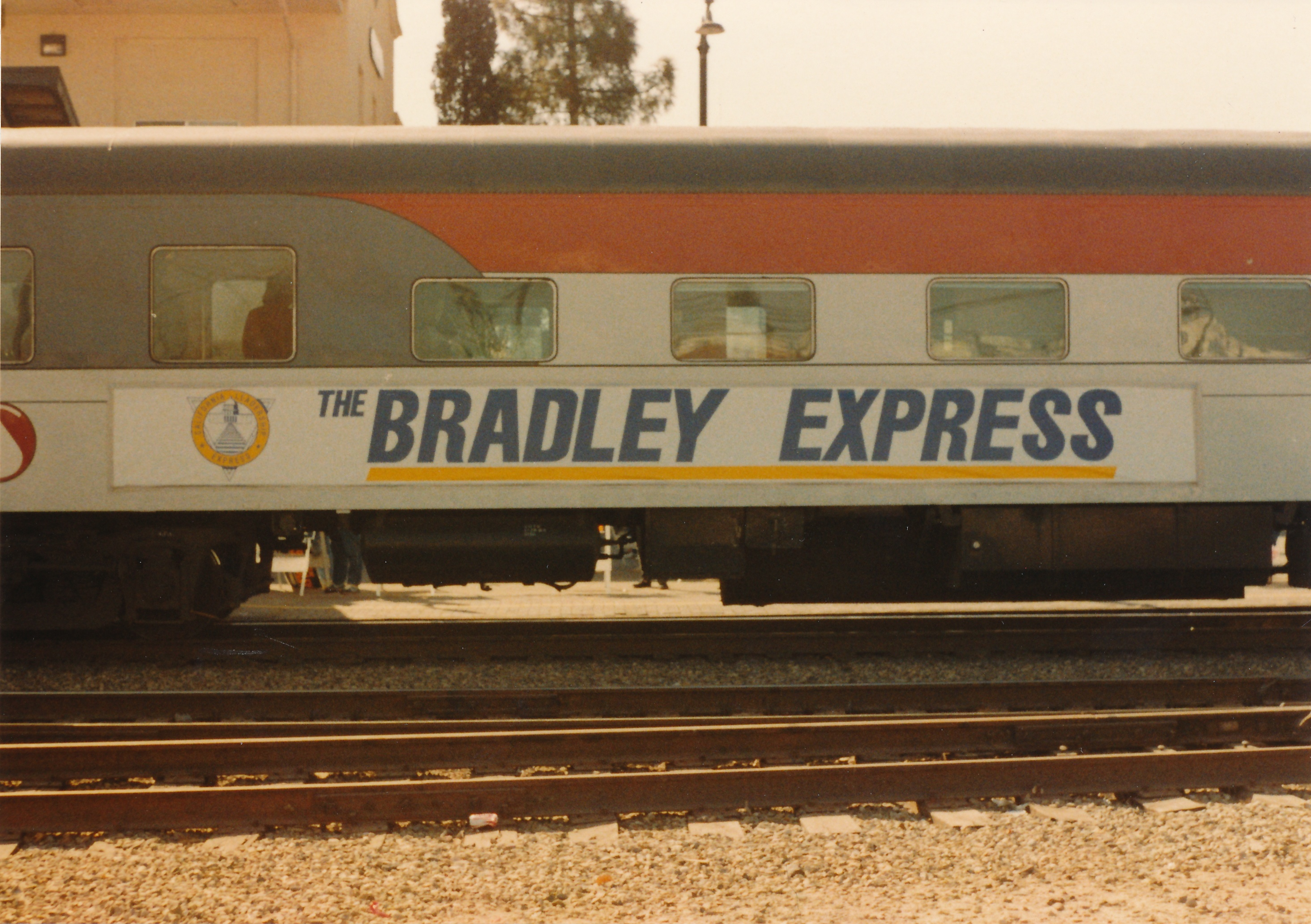
Rail car being used for a whistle-stop tour by Democratic 1986 California gubernatorial nominee Tom Bradley

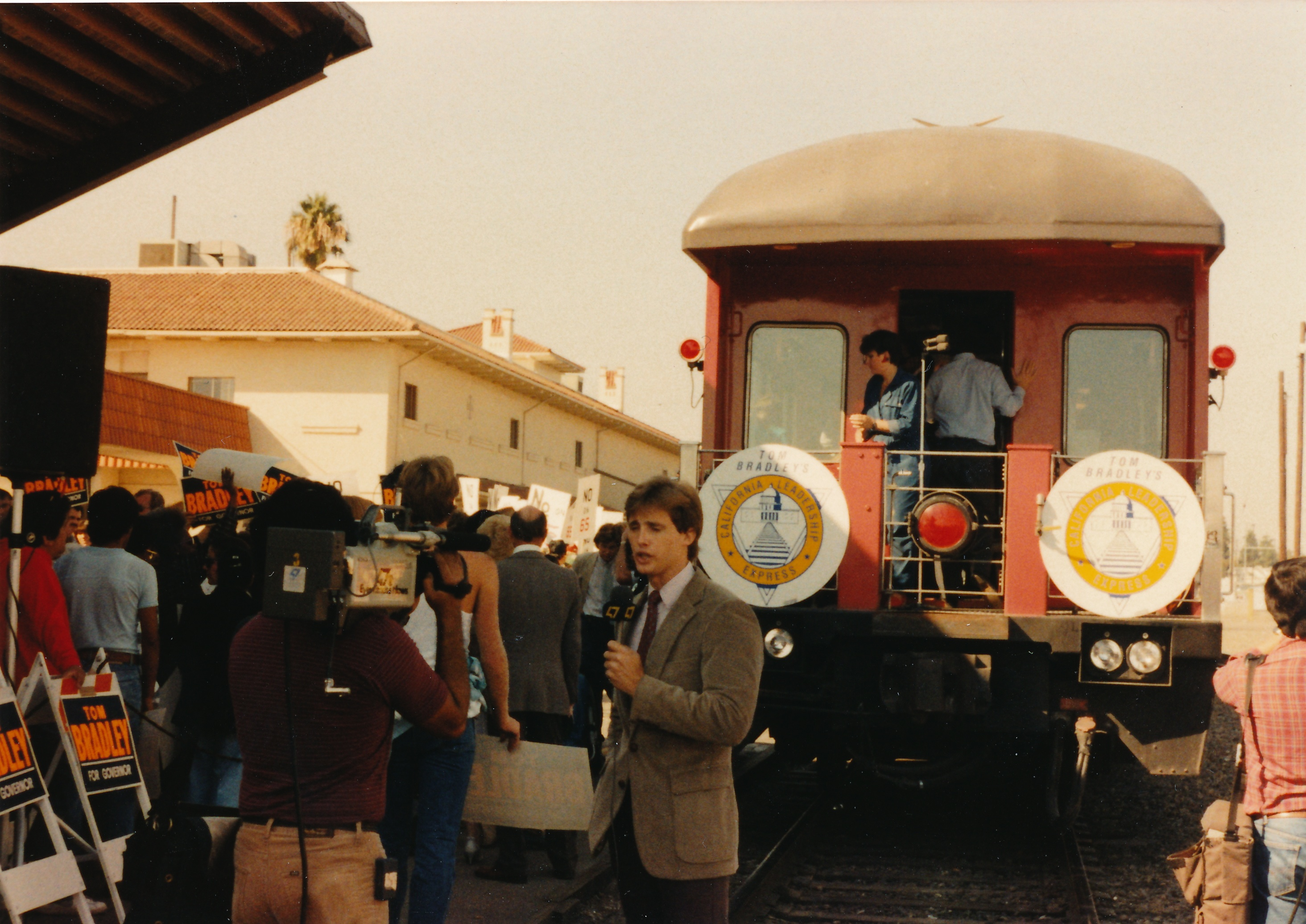
Crowd greets Tom Bradley's 1986 whistle-stop at the Fresno station

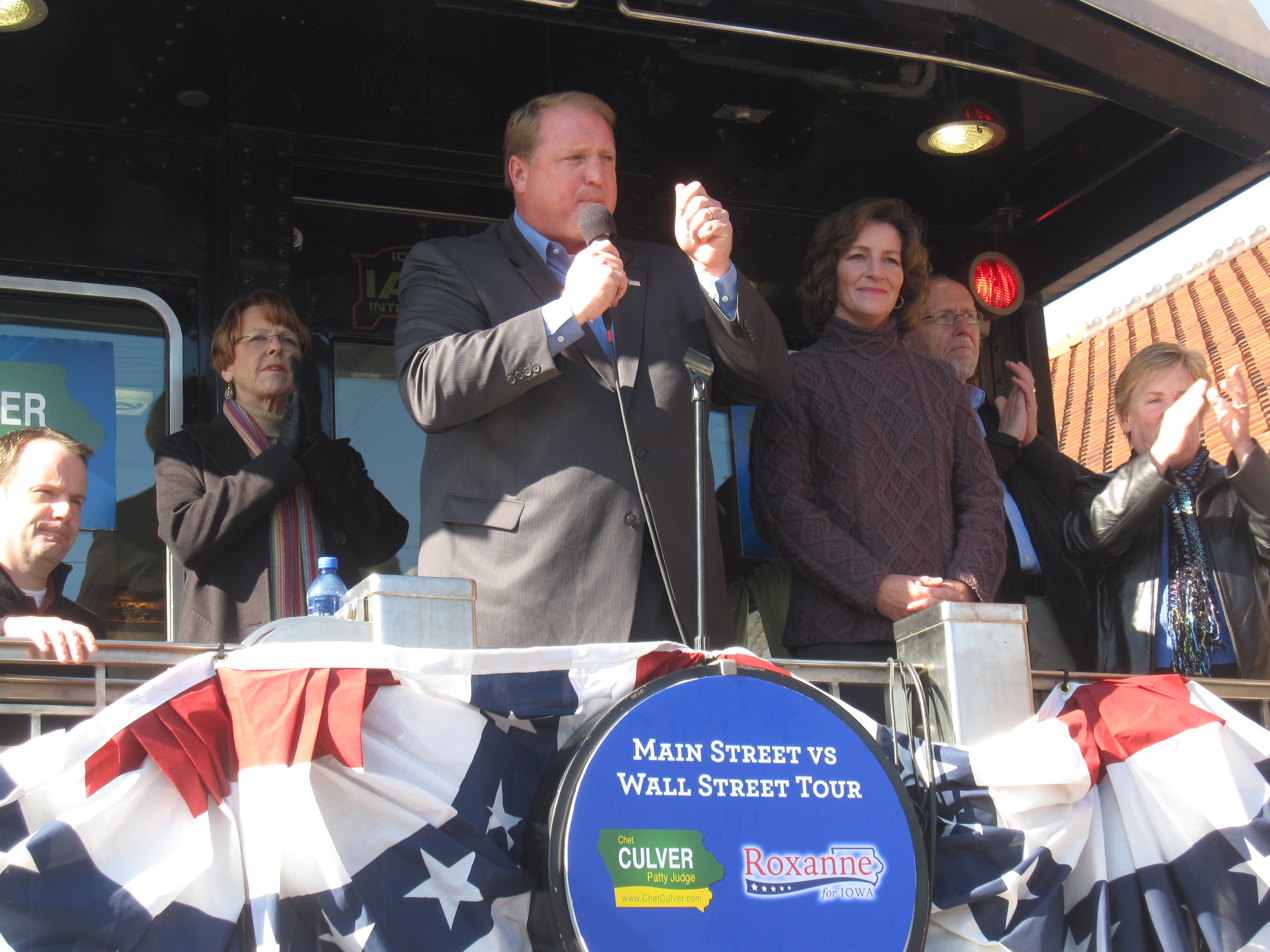
Iowa Governor Chet Culver (Democrat) delivers a speech alongside Roxanne Conlin during a 2010 whistle-stop tour in support of his gubernatorial reelection campaign and her U.S. senate campaign

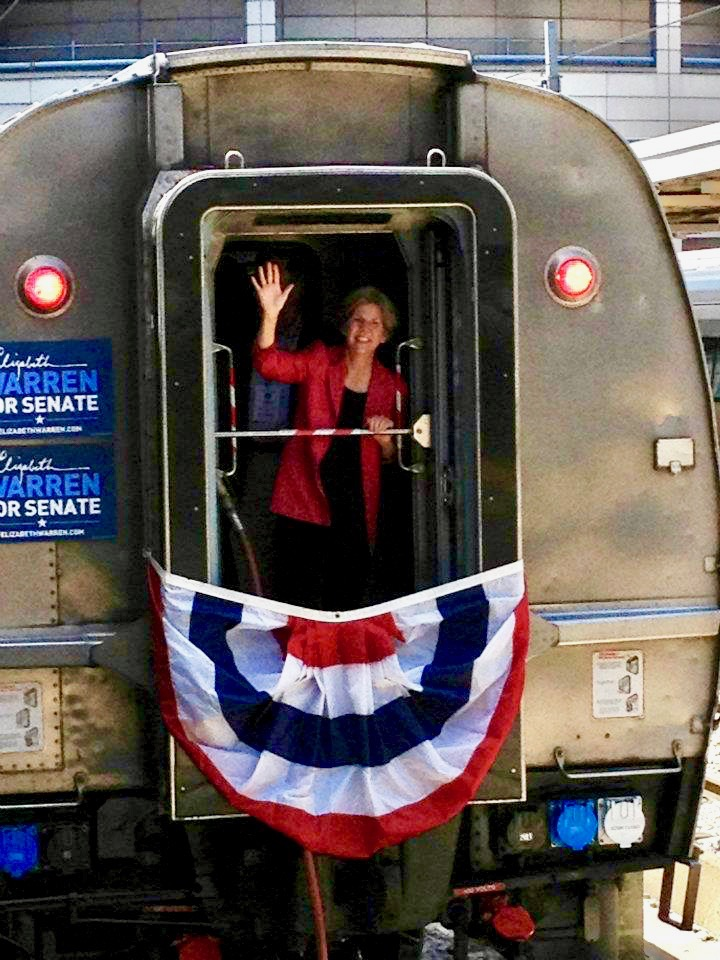
As part of her 2012 U.S. Senate campaign, Democratic nominee Elizabeth Warren embarks on a whistle-stop tour

Russian campaigns

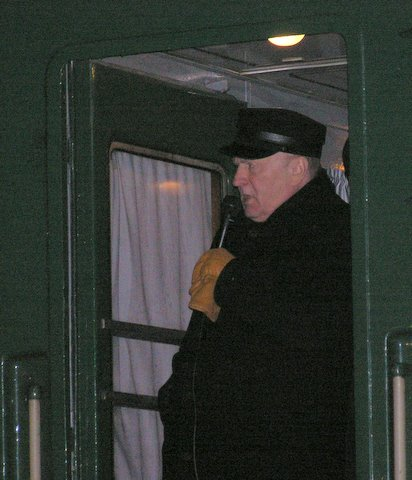
Vladimir Zhirinovsky conducts a whistle-stop in support of his party (LDPR) ahead of the 2007 Russian legislative election

Non-campaign tours

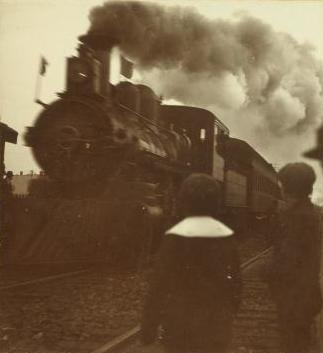
Train carrying U.S. President-elect William McKinley on a celebratory whistle-stop tour conducted ahead of his 1897 presidential inauguration

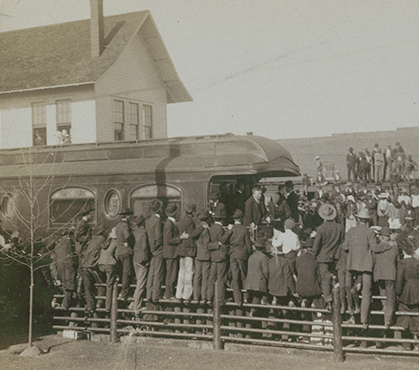
U.S. President Theodore Roosevelt makes a 1905 appearance in Hillsboro, Texas

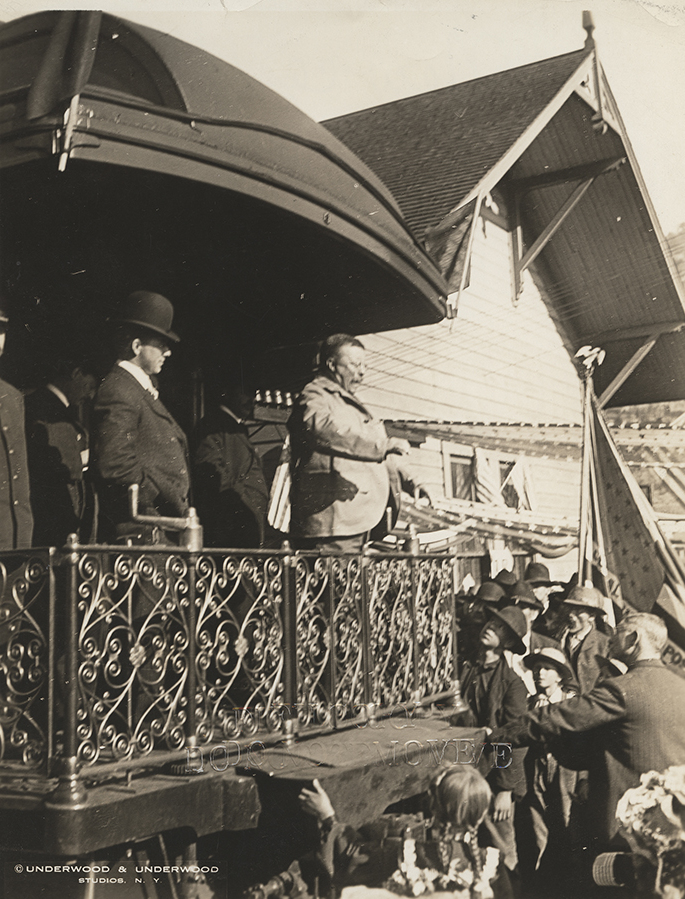
U.S. President Theodore Roosevelt speaks in Colorado in 1905

Video of U.S. President-elect Barack Obama's celebratory whistle-stop tour en route to his 2009 inauguration

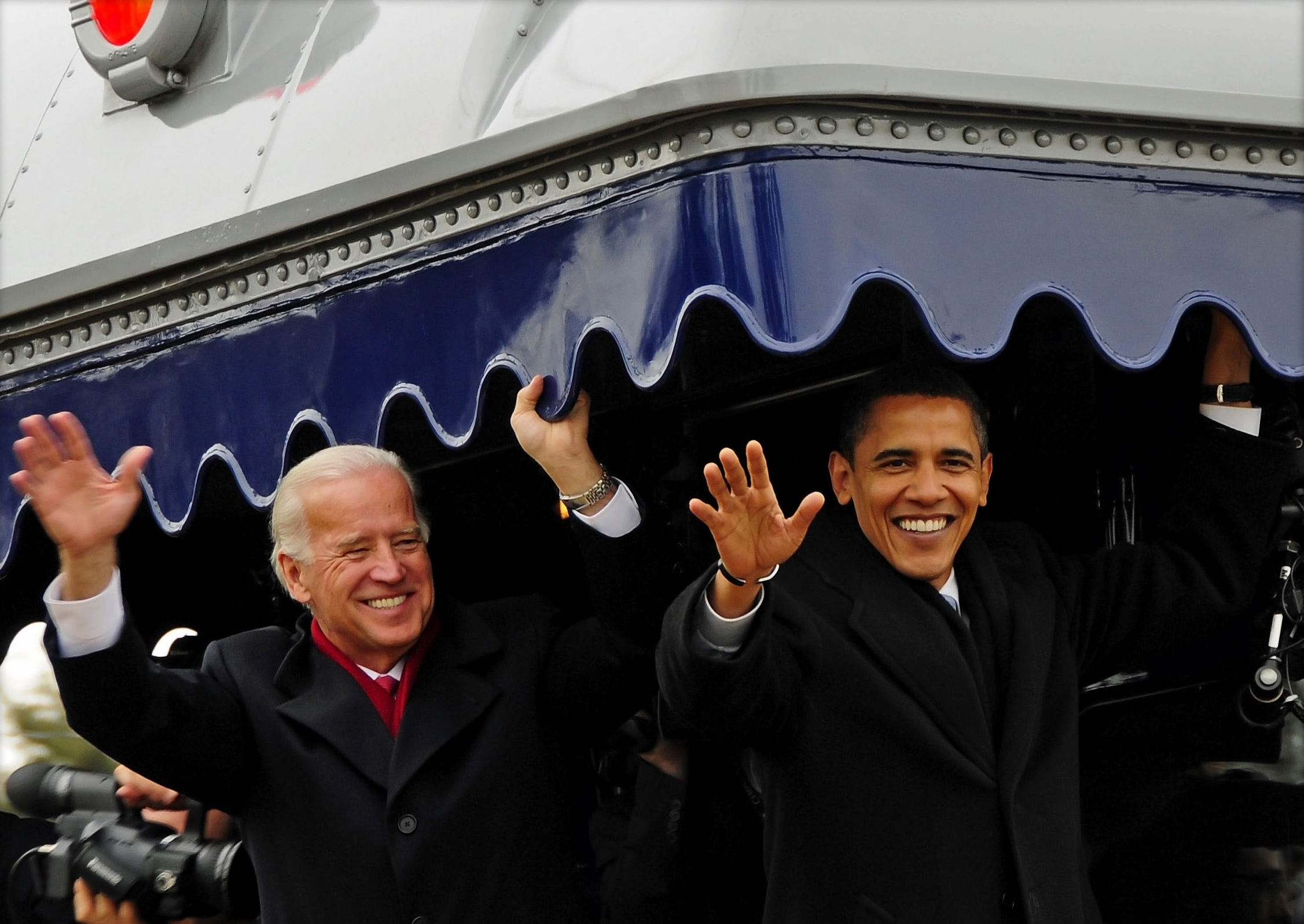
President-elect Obama with Vice President-elect Joe Biden during their 2009 celebratory pre-inauguration whistle-stop tour
