= Norwich and Worcester Railroad =

Railroad in Connecticut and Massachusetts

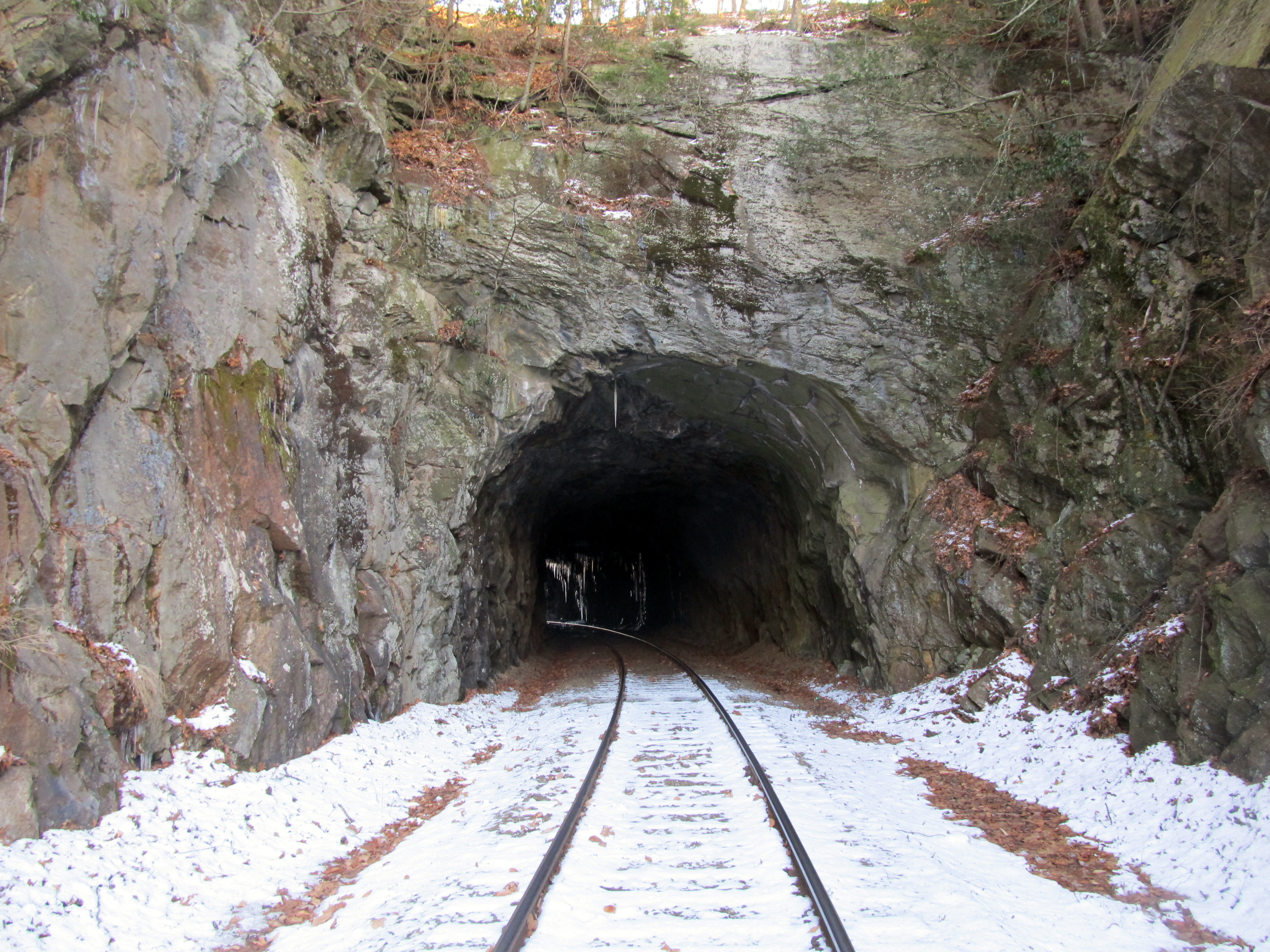
- The west portal of the Taft Tunnel in 2017

Overview
- Operator: Providence and Worcester Railroad (since 1976)
- Dates of operation: 1839–present
- Successor: New York and New England Railroad in 1869

Technical
- Track gauge: 4 ft 8 1/2 in (1,435 mm) standard gauge
- Length: 70.9 miles (114.1 km)

The Norwich and Worcester Railroad (N&W) was a railroad in the U.S. states of Connecticut and Massachusetts. Its north-south mainline ran between its namesake cities of Worcester, Massachusetts, and Norwich, Connecticut, (later extended to Groton). The Providence and Worcester Railroad (P&W) owns the ex-N&W line and operates freight service.

The railroad was chartered in 1832 in Connecticut, and in 1833 in Massachusetts; the two companies merged in 1836. Construction began in 1835. The line opened between Norwich and Plainfield in 1839, and the full length to Worcester in 1840. An extension to Allyn's Point was completed in 1843 to improve connecting steamboat operations. The line was leased by the Boston, Hartford and Erie Railroad in 1869, and became part of the New York, New Haven and Hartford Railroad (the New Haven) system in 1898. The following year, a second extension to Groton was completed.

A section of the line was electrified for streetcar service from 1907 to 1925. Local passenger service ended in 1928, but resumed from 1952 to 1971. The line from Plainfield south was included in Conrail in 1976, while the remainder reverted to the N&W. The Norwich and Worcester tried to convince regulators and politicians it could resume service on its line, but was defeated by the efforts of the P&W, which took over operations that year. P&W purchased the remainder of the line from Conrail in 1980, and has operated it since.

== History ==
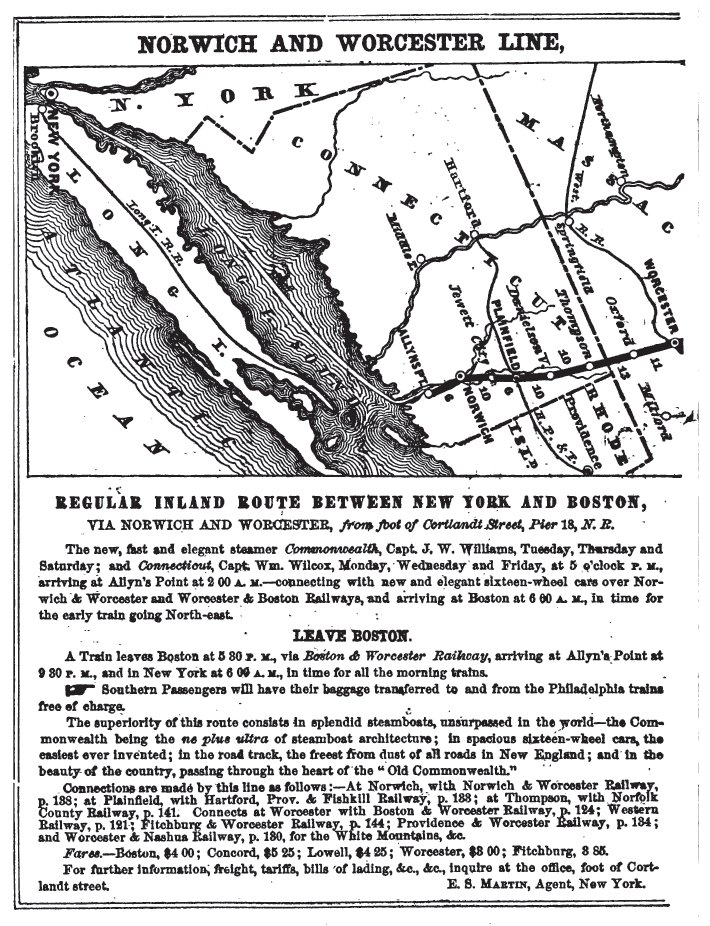
An 1859 advertisement for the company, showing connecting steamship routes

=== Formation and construction ===
The Boston, Norwich and New London Railroad was chartered by the Connecticut General Assembly in May 1832, with charter authority to build a railroad from Norwich, Connecticut, towards both Boston and Long Island Sound. Described by contemporary press as "extremely liberal", the charter did not specify a route, leaving the paths to both destinations up to the discretion of the company. Connecting to either the Boston and Worcester Railroad in Worcester, Massachusetts, or the Boston and Providence Railroad in Providence, Rhode Island, was also authorized. Surveyor William Gibbs McNeill completed a survey for a route between Norwich and Worcester that same year. McNeill estimated a cost of $1.07 million (equivalent to $37 million in 2024) for the 59-mile (95 km) line.

The chosen route ran south and slightly west from Worcester to Norwich. Much of the route closely followed industrial river valleys: the French River from Webster, Massachusetts, to Mechanicsville, Connecticut; the Quinebaug River from Mechanicsville to Putnam and from Jewett City to Taftville; and the Shetucket River from Taftville to Norwich. The segment along the rocky ledges of the southern portion of the Quinebaug was the most difficult to construct. Just east of Taftville, the line passed through the 300-foot (91 m)-long Taft Tunnel – the first common carrier railroad tunnel to be completed in the country.

In 1833, the Worcester and Norwich Railroad was chartered in Massachusetts, with the authority to build the Massachusetts portion of the line. The Connecticut and Massachusetts companies were merged in June 1836 as the Norwich and Worcester Railroad. Construction of the Norwich and Worcester Railroad commenced in November 1835 from Norwich, and the company ran its first trains from Norwich to Plainfield, Connecticut, in September 1839. Construction reached Worcester in November of that year, but the balance of the line was not opened until March 9, 1840. Two steamships, the Worcester and the New York, were purchased by the Norwich and Worcester to complete the route to New York City. The final cost of the line was about $1.5 million; only substantial loans from Massachusetts and the town of Norwich kept the company afloat during the Panic of 1837.

=== Operations ===
As an independent railroad, the Norwich and Worcester only found moderate success. Revenues were lower than expected, and the company spent the 1840s in financial trouble. Much of the line's traffic connected with New York steamships at Norwich, competing with the Stonington Line and Fall River Line for Boston–New York traffic. The railroad was assisted by a federally funded dredging of the Thames River channel. However, the upper portion of the river iced over in winter, interfering with steamship operations. In December 1843, the railroad opened a 6-mile (9.7 km) extension southward along the east bank of the Thames to Allyn's Point in Ledyard, allowing year-round ship connections.

Continued railroad building brought new connections and business to the Norwich and Worcester. By 1841, the Western Railroad (Worcester to Springfield, Massachusetts) had begun construction, and a survey was completed for the Worcester and Nashua Railroad (Worcester to Nashua, New Hampshire). Another connecting line under construction was the Long Island Rail Road (LIRR); when completed, the Norwich and Worcester estimated that an eleven-hour journey would be possible between Boston and New York, via a steamship connection from Norwich to the LIRR terminus at Greenport, New York.

Attempts to build a further extension to Long Island Sound at Groton were defeated by interference from the New London Northern Railroad, operator of a parallel line across the Thames River. However, the two railroads did complete a short connecting track along the Norwich waterfront and over the Yantic River in February 1854. The N&W obtained trackage rights over the New London Northern's line to New London to run its passenger trains to the port there. The N&W ended this arrangement in November 1855, but revived it in April 1859. The first N&W roundhouse and car shops were located in downtown Norwich, adjacent to the passenger station. They were supplemented in 1868 by a new facility in the Greeneville section of Norwich.

=== Lease and successors ===
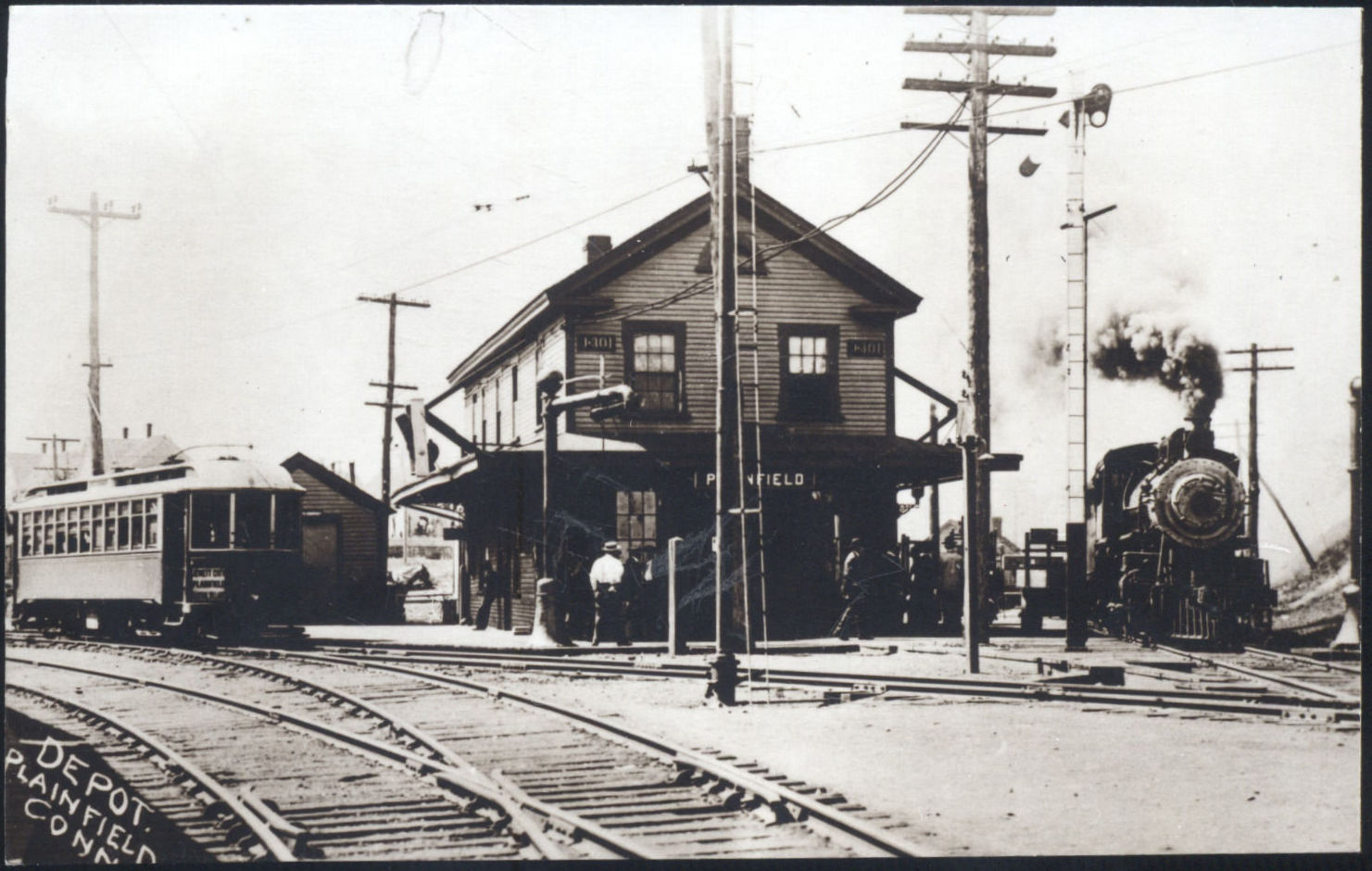
Plainfield station in the early 20th century. At left is a streetcar running on the N&W between Norwich and Central Village. At right is a Providence-bound train on the ex-NY&NE.

The Norwich and Worcester Railroad was leased in 1869 by the Boston, Hartford and Erie Railroad, which in 1875 became the New York and New England Railroad (NY&NE). The initial lease was at an unusually high annual rate of ten percent of the stock value; the struggling NY&NE cancelled the lease in 1884 and re-leased it at eight percent. In 1876, a section of the line was realigned in Norwich, using a new bridge over the Shetucket and a short tunnel under the side of Laurel Hill. The New London Northern and the N&W initially continued to use their separate stations in Norwich; not until 1892 did local criticism and a state order prompt the construction of a union station.

The NY&NE was absorbed by the New York, New Haven and Hartford Railroad (the New Haven) in 1898. With southern New England's dominant railroad in control, the 6-mile (9.7 km) extension from Allyn's Point to Groton finally received approval. Work began in October 1898, and the extension opened in June 1899. Since the Thames River Bridge had opened in 1899 between Groton and New London, the extension allowed the trackage rights over the New London Northern to be given up. The New Haven sold the Greeneville facility around 1900; it saw other industrial uses and is largely extant. The downtown Norwich facility remained in use until the 1930s, when it was demolished for a parking lot.

In the early 20th century, the New Haven experimented with electrification of branch lines. The company strung trolley wire over the line between Taftville and Central Village for use by streetcars, connecting its existing streetcar lines in eastern Connecticut. Hourly streetcar service between Norwich and Central Village began on June 17, 1907, sharing the tracks with steam trains. The streetcar service became part of New Haven subsidiary Connecticut Company in 1910, and was among its lines leased by the Shore Line Electric Railway from 1913 to 1920. In 1918, daily service included 17 streetcars in each direction, five northbound and four southbound passenger trains, and a northbound freight train.

The streetcar service ended on December 1, 1925. By this time, local passenger service on the line was provided by a self-propelled gas-electric railcar as a cost-cutting measure. Local service ended in September 1928, though New York City–Maine express trains including the State of Maine Express and Bar Harbor Express continued to use the line until April 1946. Local passenger service resumed on June 9, 1952 using a Budd Rail Diesel Car. The railroad was surprised by the ridership generated by the two daily round trips; a third round trip, additional stops at Jewett City and Plainfield, and Sunday service were all added later in 1952. The Washington, D.C.–Maine East Wind was routed via Hartford and Putnam from 1953 to 1955, using the line between Putnam and Worcester. The line was not included in the initial Amtrak system; the New London–Worcester service ended on April 30, 1971 – the day before Amtrak took over intercity passenger service in the country.

=== Independence attempt and merger ===
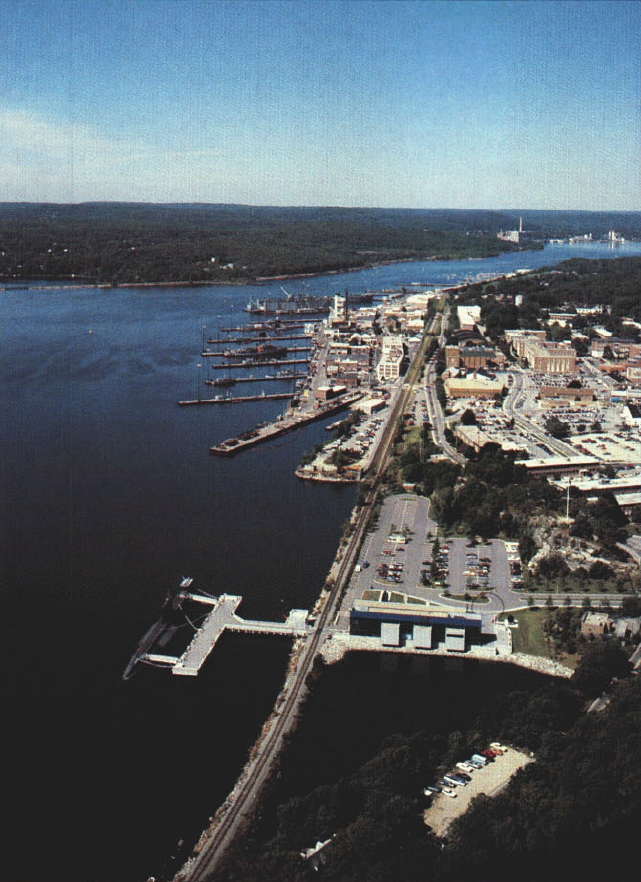
The line passes through Naval Submarine Base New London (actually located in Groton)

The New Haven went bankrupt in 1961, and never recovered. The company's bankruptcy trustees eventually disaffirmed the Norwich and Worcester Railroad lease, but per an Interstate Commerce Commission (ICC) order, the New Haven continued to operate the N&W. The short connector in Norwich, freight-only since 1899, was abandoned in 1966. The New Haven was succeeded by Penn Central Transportation Company at the end of 1968, and the order to continue operations transferred as well. Penn Central declared bankruptcy in 1970, and as a result was selected for inclusion in government-formed Conrail, which was to begin operations in 1976. Never merged into any of the companies that leased it, the Norwich and Worcester became nominally independent. It disputed being included in Conrail, arguing that with the disaffirming of the lease it was not actually part of Penn Central.

In addition to Conrail, the Providence and Worcester Railroad (P&W) was also interested in acquiring the Norwich and Worcester's line. As an active railroad, the P&W could point to its track record of profitable operations and had trains and crews available to operate the line, along with existing facilities in Worcester, plus a guarantee of financing from a bank to purchase the line. In contrast, the Norwich and Worcester had no train crews nor trains, but insisted it could secure funding to run its own railroad. A coalition of industry groups, rail unions, and several members of Connecticut's congressional delegation (including representative Chris Dodd and senator Lowell Weicker) all endorsed the P&W's takeover request.

Conrail's Final System Plan, prepared by the United States Railway Association (USRA), divided the Norwich and Worcester main line into two segments – the southern portion between Groton and Plainfield, with heavier rail traffic, would be included in Conrail, while the remainder of the line would instead go to the Providence and Worcester. By that time, the southern section was served by a weekday freight, while the northern section only had twice weekly service and was no longer used as a through route to Worcester. However, the USRA also included a contingency allowing 60 days for the Norwich and Worcester to submit a comprehensive plan showing how it would establish rail service comparable to that which Conrail and the P&W would provide. Within the same 60-day window, the P&W also had the opportunity to purchase the entire line, should the N&W agree to sell. Finally, failing the previous options occurring, the USRA issued a non-binding recommendation that Conrail and P&W reach an agreement for the latter to operate the entirety of the line.

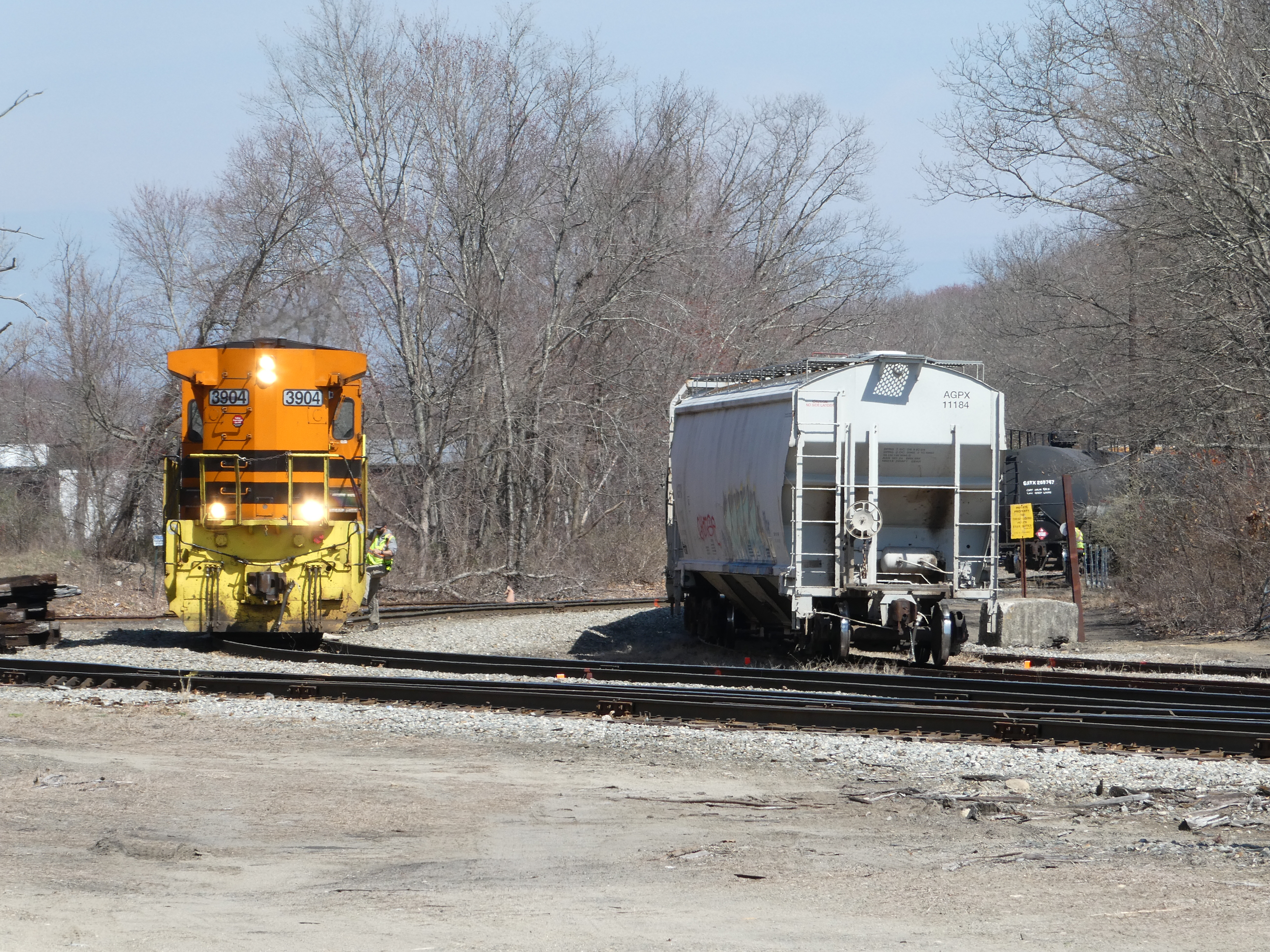
A Providence and Worcester Railroad locomotive at Plainfield in 2023

Ultimately, P&W and Conrail took over their respective segments in 1976 as outlined in the Final System Plan. P&W subsequently purchased the remainder of the line from Conrail in 1980. Left without a railroad, the Norwich and Worcester's outstanding shares were surrendered between 1985 and 1986, and the company merged into the remnants of Penn Central.

=== Providence and Worcester Railroad operations ===
The remains of the downtown Norwich shops, including the foundations of roundhouses built in 1860 and 1889, were found in 1998 during surveys prior to construction of a then-planned transportation center. By 2015, the P&W ran weekday local freights between Groton and Plainfield, plus a daily through freight between Plainfield and Worcester. P&W also operates a train between Plainfield and Cedar Hill Yard in New Haven, Connecticut. Facilities at Plainfield include a locomotive paint shop and a maintenance facility for repairing P&W trucks.

== Station listing ==
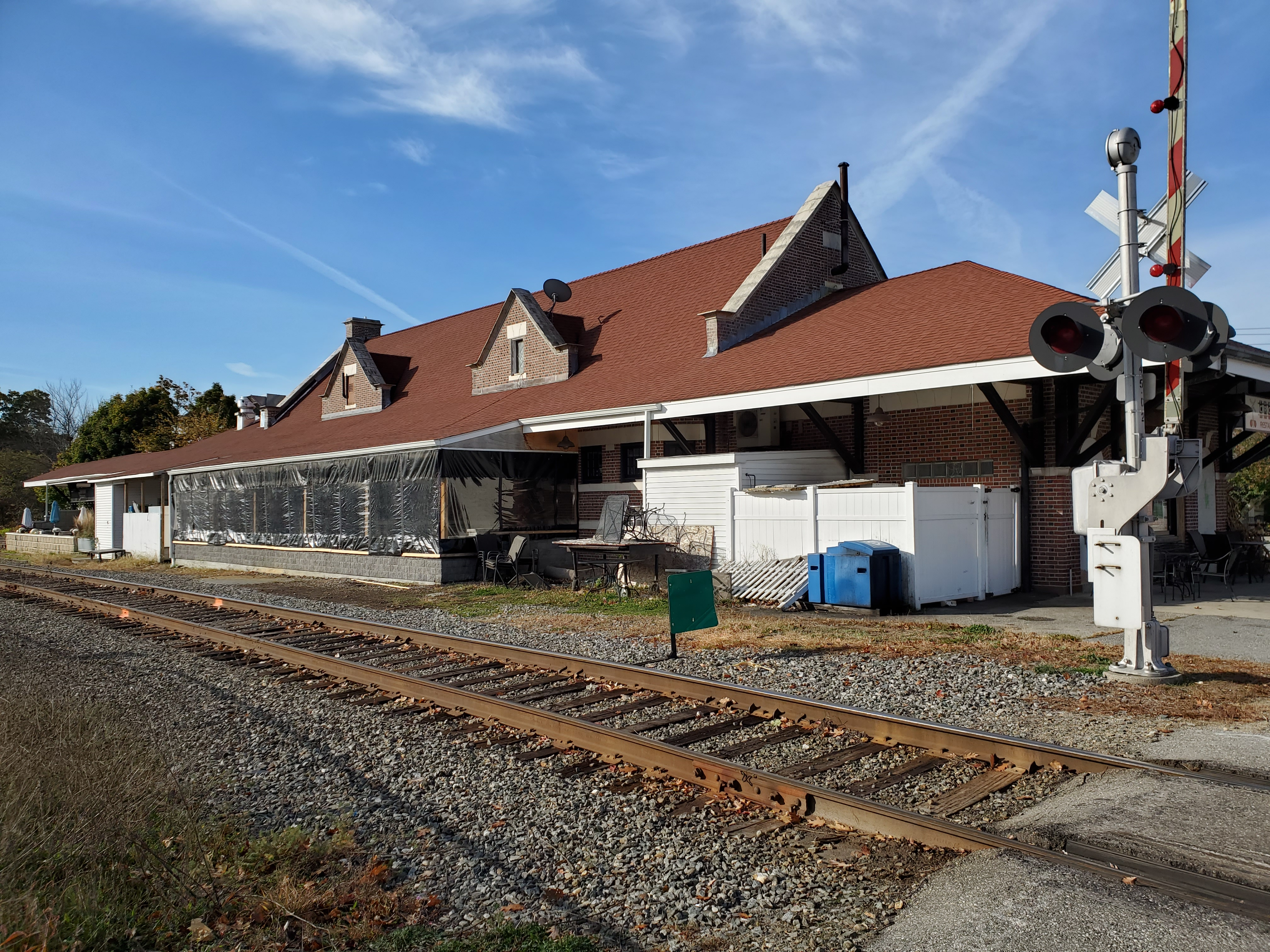
The former Putnam station, now a restaurant

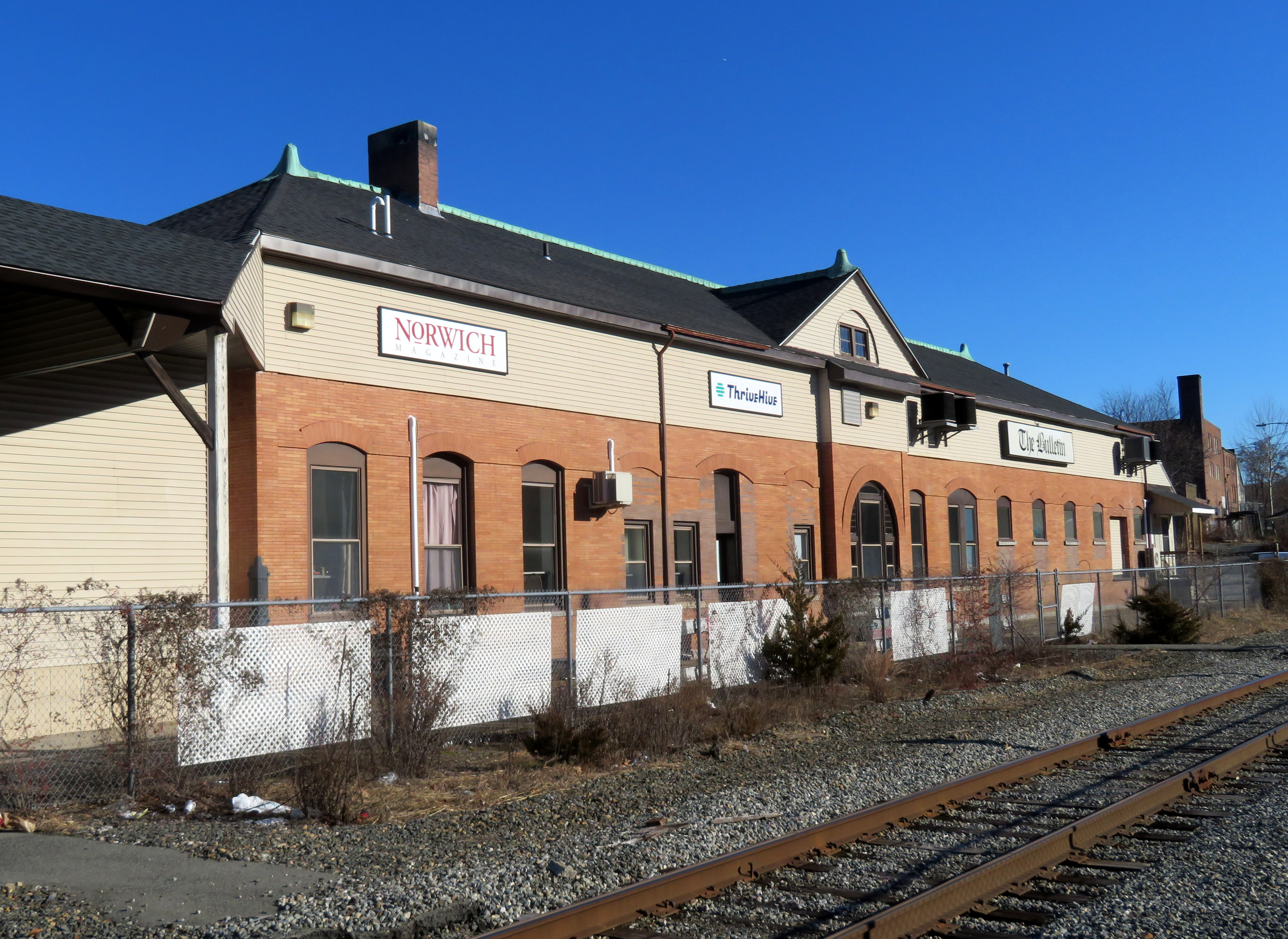
Norwich station now serves as the headquarters of the Norwich Bulletin.

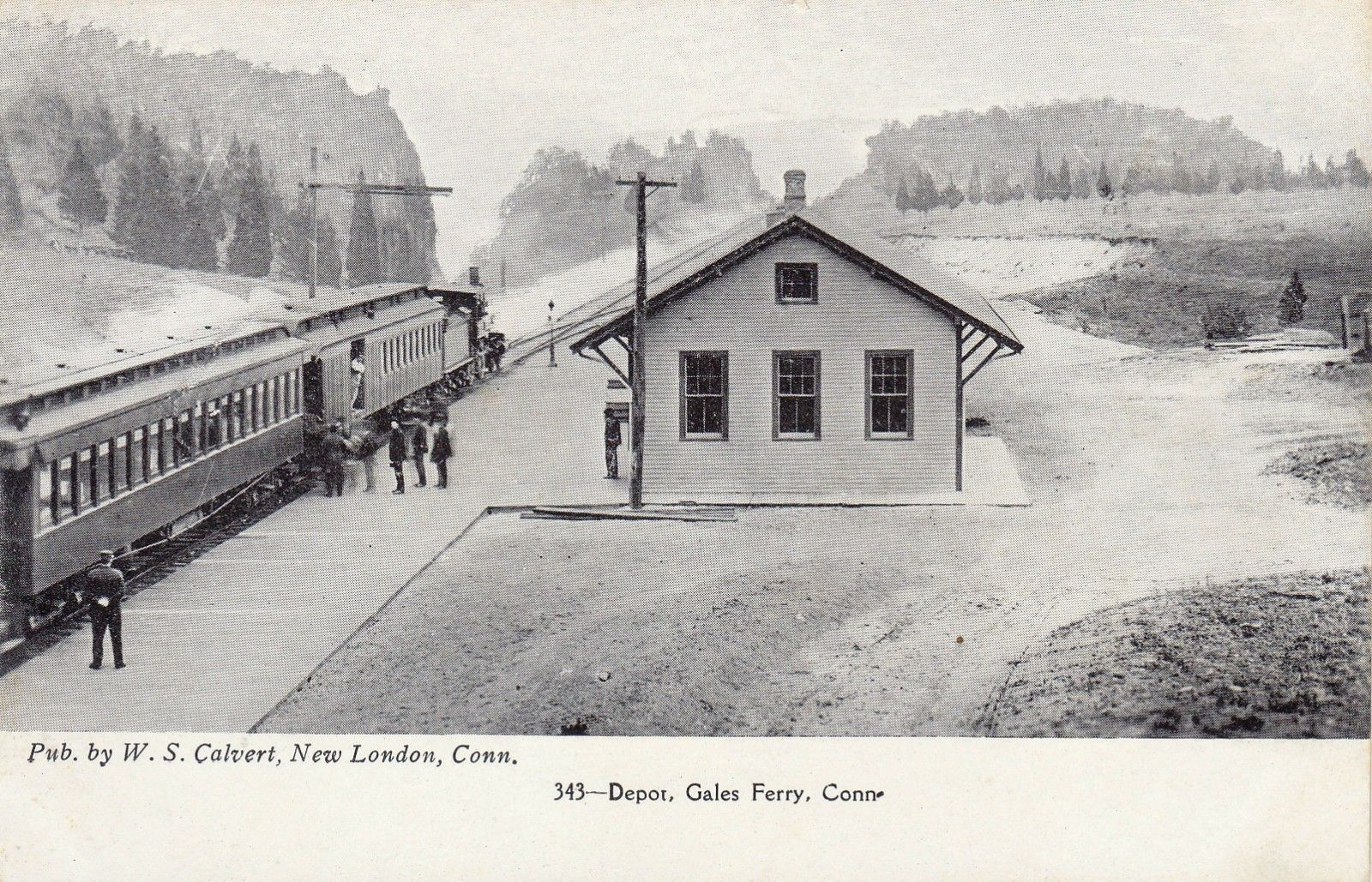
Early-20th-century postcard of the now-demolished Gales Ferry station

Former stations remain at Auburn (built circa 1839–40), Mechanicsville (1865), Putnam (1907), and Norwich (1899). The Auburn station building was built by the N&W, the Putnam and Norwich stations were built by the New Haven Railroad to replace earlier N&W structures. Worcester Union Station – built by the New Haven, the Boston and Albany Railroad, and the Boston and Maine Railroad in 1911 – remains in passenger use. It replaced an earlier union station, which had been built in 1875 to replace separate stations used by the various railroads.

State	Location	Station	Miles (km)	Connecting lines
MA	Worcester	Worcester	0.0 (0.0)	Boston and Albany Railroad, Providence and Worcester Railroad, Gardner Branch, Worcester Branch
MA	Worcester	South Worcester	0.9 (1.5)	Providence and Worcester Railroad
MA	Worcester	Cambridge Street	1.6 (2.6)	
MA	Auburn	Auburn	4.5 (7.3)	
MA	Auburn	Stones Crossing	5.7 (9.1)	
MA	Auburn	Maywood	7.1 (11.4)	
MA	Oxford	North Oxford	8.8 (14.2)	
MA	Oxford	Oxford	11.2 (18.0)	
MA	Webster	North Webster	14.9 (23.9)	
MA	Webster	Webster	16.0 (25.7)	Southbridge Branch
MA	Webster	Perrys	17.7 (28.5)	
CT	Thompson	Wilsonville	18.6 (29.9)	
CT	Thompson	North Grosvenordale	20.4 (32.9)	
CT	Thompson	Grosvenordale	21.9 (35.3)	
CT	Thompson	West Thompson	23.5 (37.9)	
CT	Thompson	Mechanicsville	24.0 (38.6)	
CT	Putnam	Putnam	26.0 (41.8)	New York and New England Railroad
CT	Killingly	Dayville	31.1 (50.1)	
CT	Killingly	Danielson	33.9 (54.6)	
CT	Plainfield	Wauregan	38.5 (61.9)	
CT	Plainfield	Central Village	39.8 (64.0)	
CT	Plainfield	Plainfield	42.9 (69.0)	New York and New England Railroad
CT	Griswold	Jewett City	49.2 (79.2)	
CT	Norwich	Tafts	55.8 (89.8)	
CT	Norwich	Greeneville	57.5 (92.5)	
CT	Norwich	Norwich	58.8 (94.6)	Branch to Norwich Union Station
CT	Preston	Fort Point	61.6 (99.2)	Norwich and Westerly Railway freight spur
CT	Preston	Poquetanuck Drawbridge	63.1 (101.6)	
CT	Ledyard	Stoddard's Wharf	63.9 (102.9)	
CT	Ledyard	Allyns Point	64.9 (104.5)	
CT	Ledyard	Gales Ferry	66.1 (106.4)	
CT	Ledyard	Breakwater	67.7 (108.9)	
CT	Groton	Navy Yard	68.8 (110.8)	
CT	Groton	Fairview	70.0 (112.6)	
CT	Groton	Groton	70.9 (114.1)	New York, Providence and Boston Railroad (now Northeast Corridor)
