= Putnam station =

- Putnam Railroad Station
- U.S. National Register of Historic Places
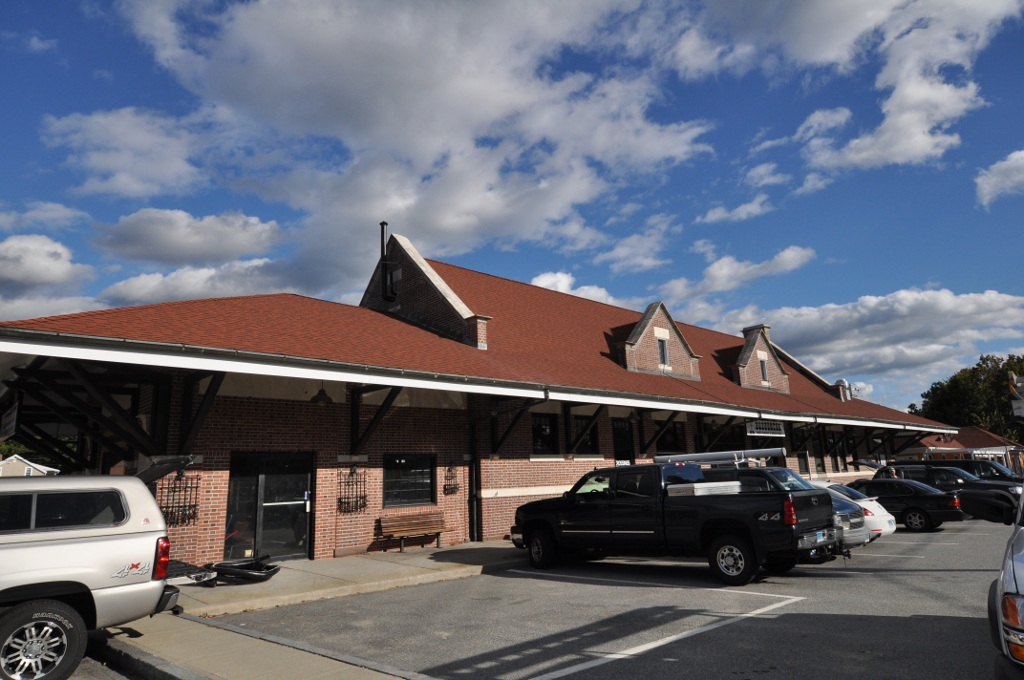
- Interactive map of Putnam Railroad Station
- Location: 35, 45-47 Main Street, Putnam, Connecticut
- Coordinates: 41°54′51.5″N 71°54′29.4″W
- Area: less than one acre
- Built: 1907
- Architect: Patterson, William
- Architectural style: Late 19th And 20th Century Revivals
- NRHP reference No.: 07000742
- Added to NRHP: July 24, 2007

Putnam station is a former train station in Putnam, Connecticut. Built in 1907, it is a reminder of the importance of the railroad in the development of Putnam as a city, and is an architecturally distinctive example of Mediterranean-influenced design. The building, now in other commercial uses, was added to the National Register of Historic Places in 2007 as Putnam Railroad Station.

== Description and history ==
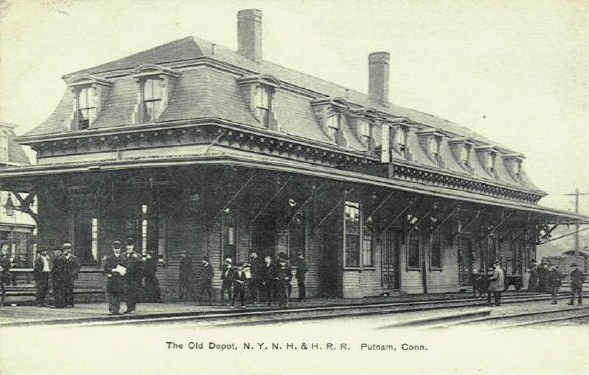
The previous station building

The former station is located near the southern end of Putnam's central business district, between Main Street and South Main Street south of Front Street. It is oriented roughly north-south, with its east facade originally facing the railroad tracks, an area now overlaid by parking for the building. It is a 1-1/2 story brick building with a central gable-roofed section and flanking hip-roof sections at either end. Its terra cotta tile roof and colored brick give it a flavor of Mediterranean architectural styles.

Putnam was one of the early centers of textile industry in eastern Connecticut, dotted with small mill villages along its waterways. The arrival of the Norwich and Worcester Railroad in 1840 spurred the development of downtown Putnam as an economic center, which was accelerated by the construction of additional rail lines in the following decades. One of its earliest stations to serve all of these lines, operated jointly by the Norwich and Worcester and the New York and New England Railroad, was located nearer Front Street. The present station was sited and designed to solve a number of problems that arose in the use of that station, and was completed in 1907. It was built by the New York, New Haven and Hartford Railroad, which had consolidated management of all of the lines passing through the town. The station was used for passenger service until April 30, 1971, when Penn Central dropped the sole round trip from New London to Worcester since it was not included in the initial Amtrak system. Service from Hartford to Boston via Putnam on the former NY&NE ended in 1955 when the Flood of 1955 washed out the bridge just south of downtown. The station has been converted to commercial use.

== See also ==
- National Register of Historic Places listings in Windham County, Connecticut
