= Southbridge Branch =

Southbridge refers to the following rail lines:

- Southbridge Branch, New Zealand
- Southbridge Branch (New England) in Connecticut and Massachusetts, United States
