= Southbridge and Blackstone Railroad =

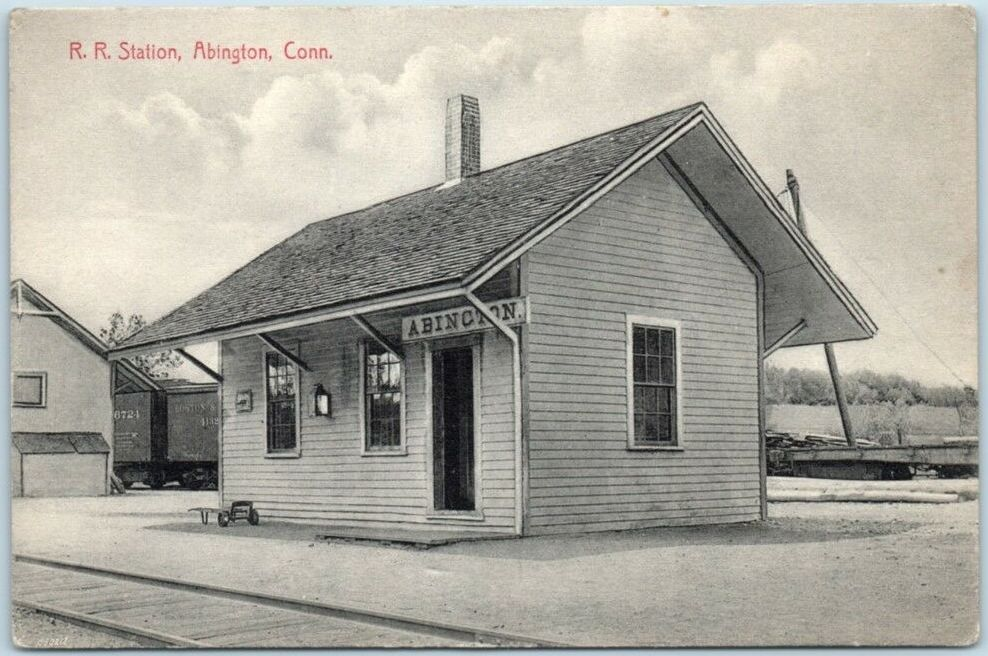
The station at Abington, Connecticut, built for the 1872 extension to Willimantic

The Southbridge and Blackstone Railroad was a railroad company that was the precursor to the Willimantic, Connecticut–Blackstone, Massachusetts line of the New York, New Haven and Hartford Railroad (NYNH&H). It was chartered in 1849 to build a line from Southbridge, Massachusetts, to Blackstone. In 1853, with construction underway, it was merged into the Boston and New York Central Railroad (B&NYC). The B&NYC used the charter of the East Thompson Railroad, another of its constituent lines, to alter the routing: west of East Thompson, Connecticut, the merged line continued southwest to Mechanicsville, Connecticut, where it met the Norwich and Worcester Railroad. The Mechanicsville–Blackstone line opened in 1854.

A successor company, the Boston, Hartford and Erie Railroad, completed the originally-planned Southbridge–East Thompson segment in 1867; it became the Southbridge Branch. An extension southwest from Mechanicsville to Willimantic opened in 1872. The completion of the Boston and New York Air-Line Railroad the next year created an all-rail route from New York City to Boston via Willimantic and Blackstone. The line passed to the New York and New England Railroad in 1875, the New England Railroad in 1895, and finally the NYNH&H in 1898. It was operated as part of the NYNH&H's Midland Division.

Passenger service ended in 1955 after floods from Hurricane Diane destroyed a bridge south at Putnam, Connecticut, and the segment from Putnam to Pomfret, Connecticut was abandoned. From North Windham, Connecticut to Pomfret was abandoned in 1959, and from Putnam to Blackstone in 1969. The remaining section from Willimantic to North Windham lasted until the mid 1980s. The Connecticut portion of the line was later converted to part of the Air Line State Park Trail, and the Massachusetts portion to part of the Southern New England Trunkline Trail.
