= Connecticut Central Railroad (1871) =

Defunct railroad in Connecticut and Massachusetts

- Map of the Connecticut Central and the Springfield and New London
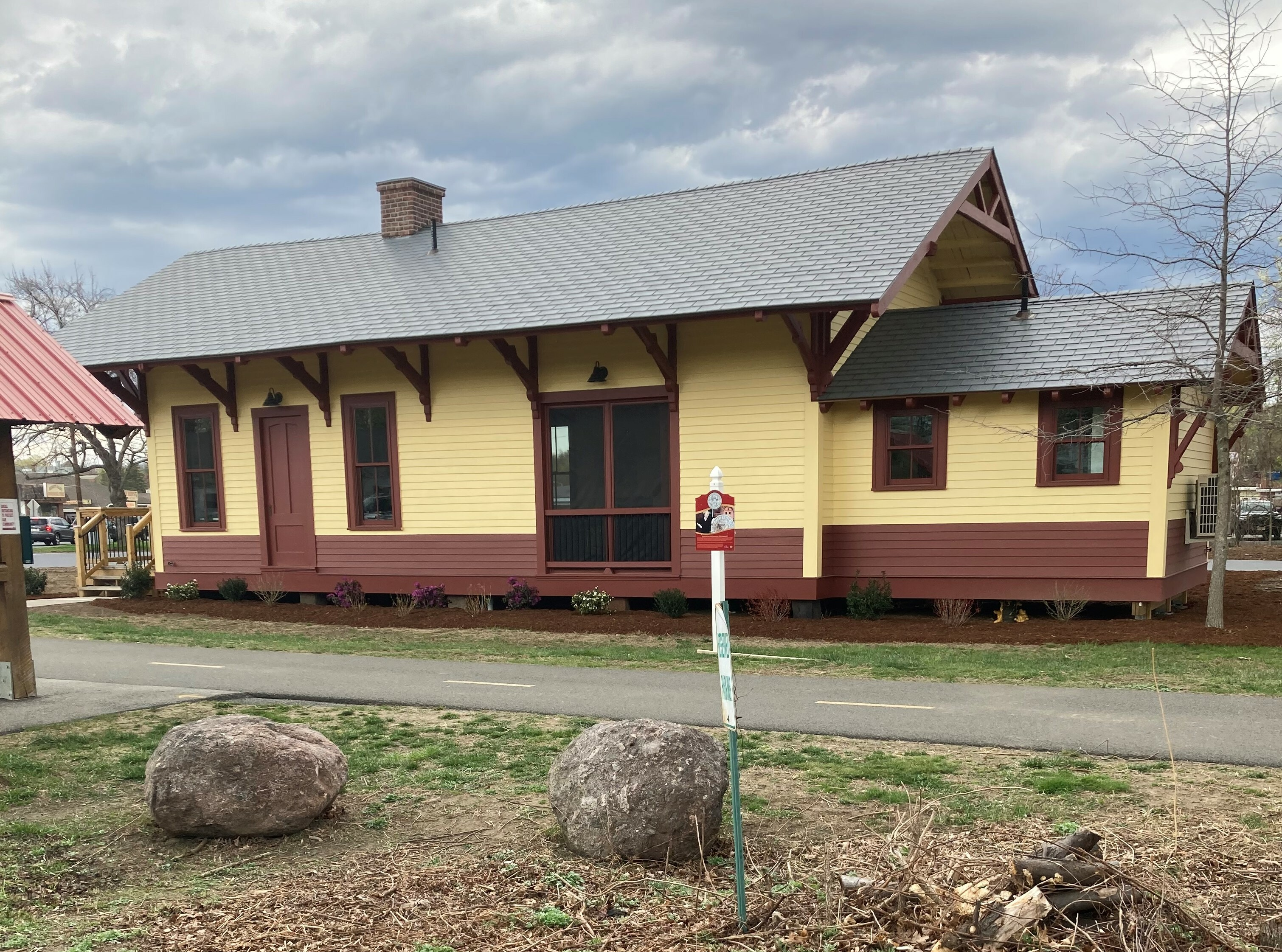
- The preserved depot in East Longmeadow, Massachusetts was built by the Connecticut Central Railroad in 1876.

Overview
- Current operator: Connecticut Southern Railroad; Central New England Railroad
- Dates of operation: 1876–1880 (independent operations); 1880–1887 (as a corporate entity)
- Successor: New York and New England Railroad

Technical
- Track gauge: 4 ft 8 1/2 in (1,435 mm) standard gauge
- Length: 37 miles (including Westway Branch)

The Connecticut Central Railroad was a railroad in Connecticut and Massachusetts, which connected East Hartford, Connecticut and Springfield, Massachusetts. Founded in 1871, it was built between 1874 and 1876, and operated independently until being leased by the New York and New England Railroad in 1880. In the 21st century, the line remains in service between East Hartford and Scantic, Connecticut, and out of service to the Massachusetts state line, beyond which it has been abandoned.

== History ==
=== Formation and construction ===
The Connecticut Central Railroad was founded in 1871 by a group of investors, intending to build a line between Hartford, Connecticut and Springfield, Massachusetts, though the Hartford and New Haven Railroad already had an existing and very successful route between these two cities. The company initially envisioned a continuation south to Portland, Connecticut, though this was decided against before the start of construction. The final route was between Springfield and East Hartford, Connecticut, with access to Hartford via a connection to the Hartford, Providence & Fishkill Railroad (HP&F).

==== Funding ====
To build their proposed railroad, the promoters of the Connecticut Central Railroad had to secure funding, while also dealing with interference from the competing New York, New Haven and Hartford Railroad (The New Haven), successor of the Hartford and New Haven. The New Haven was unhappy with the Connecticut Central building a directly competing route, and took measures to sabotage funding for its competitor. In one instance during Spring 1873, the town of South Windsor, which was on the route of the Connecticut Central, attempted to hold a meeting to discuss the town providing financial support for the new company. Town law required that a sufficient number of signatures from property owners in the town be collected to approve such a meeting, and the Connecticut Central initially accomplished this. Before the meeting could happen, however, representatives from the New Haven convinced enough signatories to retract their signatures, scuttling the meeting.

Despite the New Haven Railroad's attempt to stop construction before it began, the Connecticut Central raised sufficient funding from investors and towns along its route and began construction in 1874.

==== Construction ====
To reach Springfield, the Connecticut Central worked with a Massachusetts company, the Springfield and Longmeadow Railroad. The Springfield and Longmeadow, chartered on May 2, 1849, predated the Connecticut Central by more than two decades, but it had yet to begin construction. In 1874, its charter was modified to authorize it to meet the Connecticut Central at the state line, and the name changed to the Springfield and New London Railroad. Construction between East Hartford and Springfield was complete in early 1876.

In addition to the main line, an eight mile long branch was built between Melrose and Rockville, meeting a branch of the HP&F in the latter town. Known as the Westway Branch, for the neighborhood in Rockville where it ended, construction began in 1875, and it opened not long after the main line did.

=== Operations ===
As the Connecticut Central was nearing completion, the Connecticut Valley Railroad decided to lease it, taking over both lines. This was not for long, as the Valley Railroad found itself bankrupt shortly after completing the lease agreement. The Valley Railroad offered to continue the lease at the reduced rate of $15,000 per year, compared to the $28,000 per year of the original lease. The Connecticut Central and the Valley Railroad ultimately decided to "agree to disagree" on how much the former company's line was worth, and came to an agreement whereby the Connecticut Central took over the Valley Railroad's lease, profits would be shared between the two companies, and Connecticut Central trains would exclusively call at the Valley Railroad's depot near Hartford. This agreement went into effect at the end of July 1876, freeing the Connecticut Central to run its own trains.

However, at the same time the Springfield and New London decided to accept a new, lower lease agreement from the Valley Railroad, rather than allowing the Connecticut Central to lease it. The Valley Railroad offered $8,000 per year, besting the Connecticut Central's offer of $5,000 per year. Now cut off from Springfield, the Connecticut Central filed a petition with the Massachusetts state railroad commission asking for the Springfield and New London to either be required to haul Connecticut Central trains north of the state line, or to grant it trackage rights so it could operate its own trains in Massachusetts. By October 1876, the Connecticut Central had leased the Springfield and New London.

Four years later, the company was leased again, this time by the New York and New England Railroad (NY&NE). The NY&NE was a bitter rival of the New York, New Haven and Hartford Railroad (successor of the Hartford and New Haven), and the Connecticut Central's route gave it a competing line between Hartford and Springfield, though not nearly as direct (32 miles vs 25 miles). In 1887, the NY&NE formally purchased the Connecticut Central, along with the Springfield and New London, ending the existence of both.

=== Under the NYNH&H ===
The NYNY&H took control of its nemesis, the NY&NE, in 1895, before formally leasing it in 1898. As a part of the New Haven system, the Connecticut Central alignment was always secondary to the far more direct Hartford and New Haven alignment, and passenger service along the line was discontinued entirely by 1932. The Westway Branch was abandoned between Melrose and Ellington in 1937. Both the remainder of the Westway Branch and the main line continued to decline in importance as overall freight traffic in the region declined; the rest of the Westway Branch was discontinued in 1963. Bankrupt since 1961, the New Haven was taken over by the Penn Central Transportation Company in 1969.

=== Penn Central and beyond ===
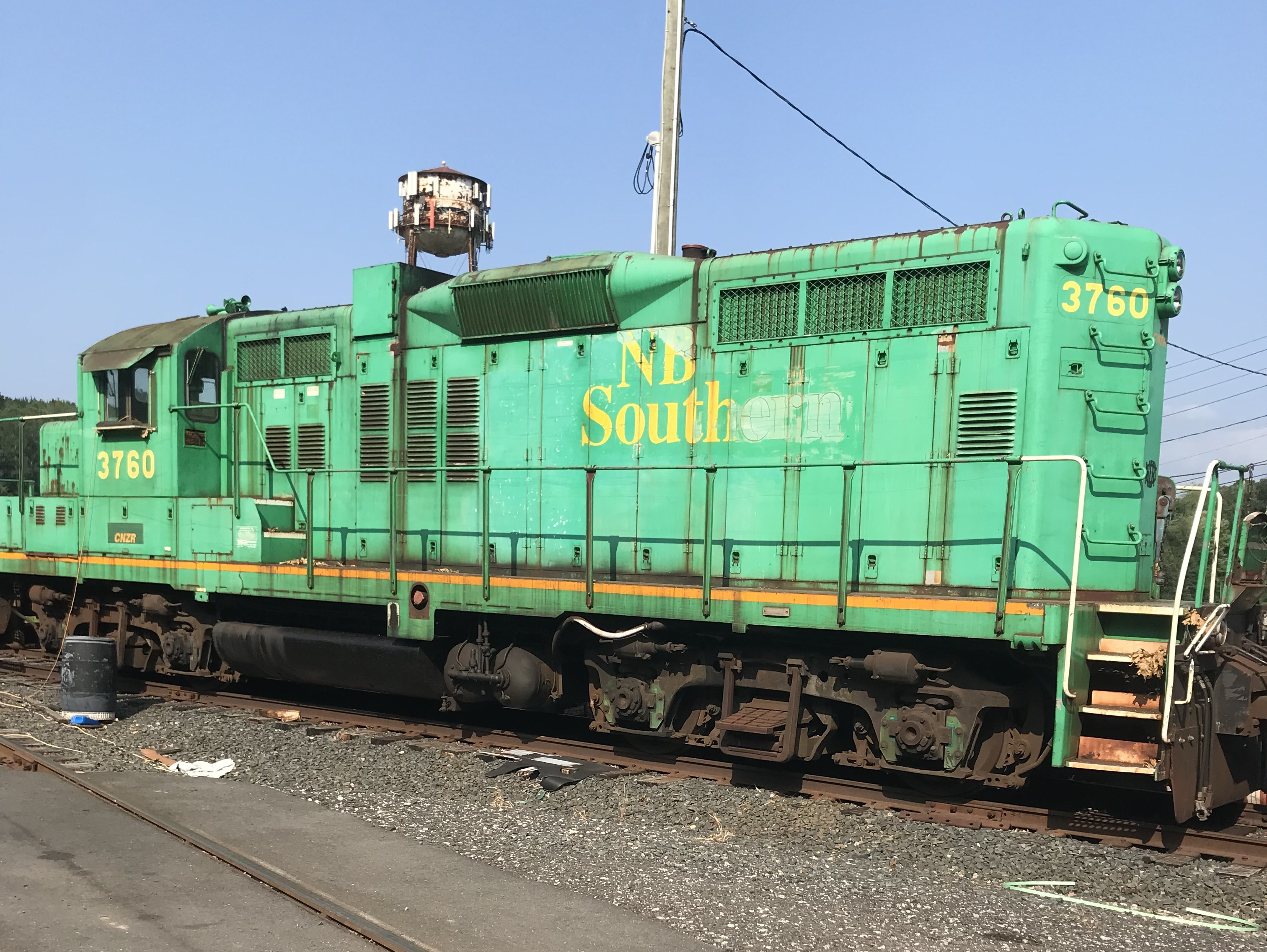
As of 2021, the northern terminus of the former Connecticut Central Railroad line is in Scantic, Connecticut, where a small yard is operated by the Central New England Railroad.

Penn Central took the line out of service between Hazardville and East Windsor in 1972; this segment was officially abandoned in 1976 when the government-formed Consolidated Rail Corporation (Conrail) took over from the bankrupt Penn Central. Now divided into two pieces, Conrail provided freight service on both. The southern portion between East Hartford and East Windsor remained relatively busy with daily train service, while the northern portion saw service a few days a week.

Conrail spun off the northern portion of the Connecticut Central line to the Boston and Maine Railroad in 1982. The B&M named its portion the Armory Branch, after the nearby Springfield Armory. Operations continued until 1990, with the line being formally abandoned in 1993. Meanwhile, Conrail cut back its portion of the line from East Windsor to the new terminus of South Windsor in 1986. The four miles from East Hartford to South Windsor were all that remained of the Connecticut Central until 1996, when the state of Connecticut, dissatisfied with the progressive abandonments of the line, purchased the right-of-way between East Windsor and the Massachusetts state line in Enfield. Operations were transferred to two new shortline railroads: the Connecticut Southern Railroad began serving the line between East Hartford and South Windsor, while the Central New England Railroad began operating from South Windsor to East Windsor, following the return of that portion of the line to service.

The Central New England began to rebuild the rest of the line north of East Windsor to the state line, in the hopes of resuming freight service. This was completed in 2001, but at the time no customers could be found, and as a result the line was placed out of service, awaiting interest from local shippers. In the next 20 years, parts of the out of service portion were cut, but most of it remains dormant.
