= New York and New England Railroad =

Defunct railroad in southern New England

Overview
- Dates of operation: 1846–1898
- Successor: New York, New Haven and Hartford Railroad

Technical
- Track gauge: 4 ft 8 1/2 in (1,435 mm) standard gauge

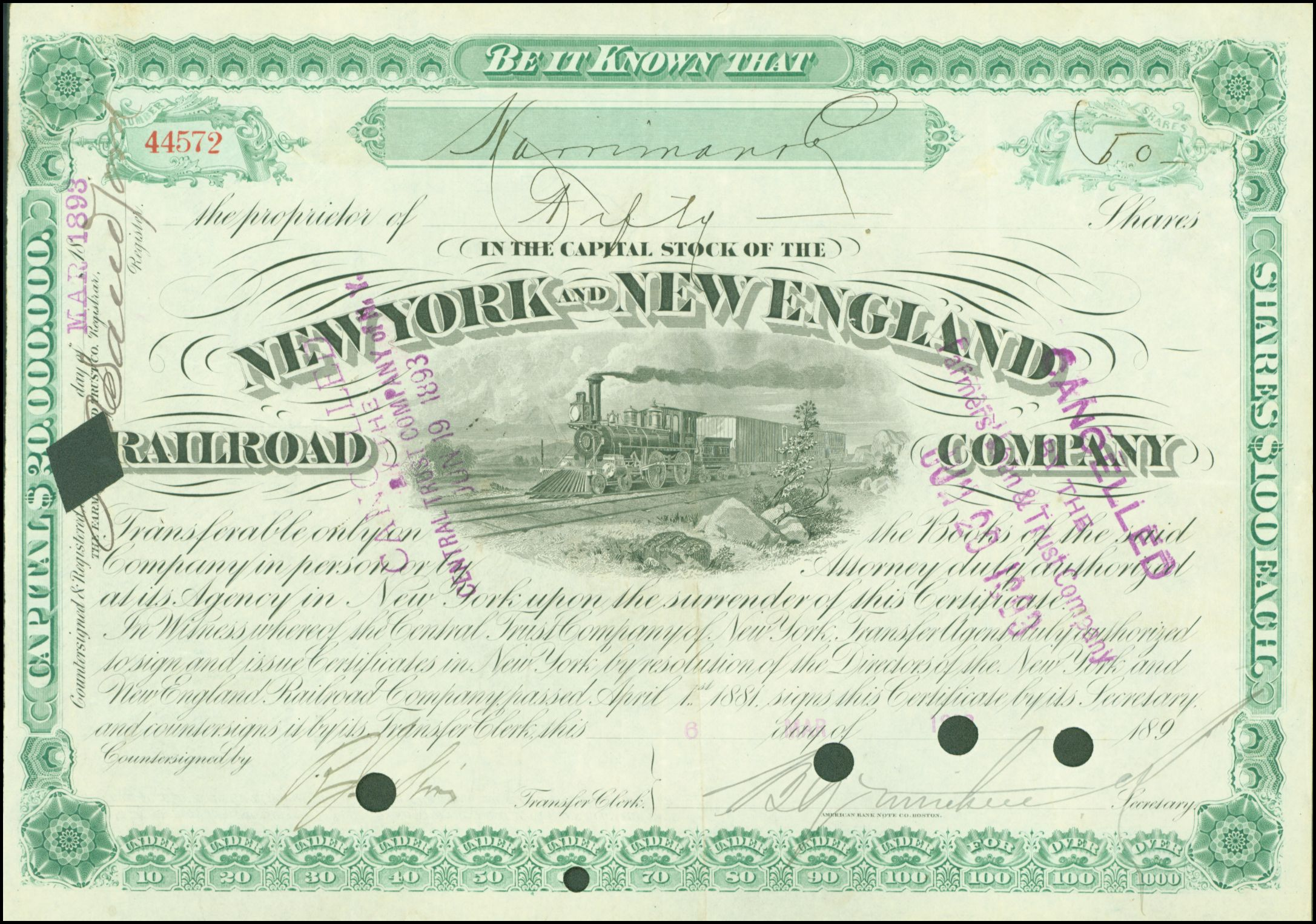
Share of the New York and New England Railroad Company, issued March 6, 1893

The New York and New England Railroad (NY&NE) was a railroad connecting southern New York State with Hartford, Connecticut; Providence, Rhode Island; and Boston, Massachusetts. It operated under that name from 1873 to 1893. Prior to 1873 it was known as the Boston, Hartford and Erie Railroad, which had been formed from several smaller railroads that dated back to 1846. After a bankruptcy in 1893, the NY&NE was reorganized and briefly operated as the New England Railroad before being leased to the competing New York, New Haven and Hartford Railroad in 1898.

Today, most of the original New York and New England lines have been abandoned. A segment in Massachusetts is now part of the MBTA's Franklin/Foxboro Line providing commuter rail service to South Station in Boston, and another segment near East Hartford and Manchester, Connecticut, is used for freight service on the Connecticut Southern Railroad. Other portions in Connecticut and Rhode Island have been converted to rail trails.

== History ==
=== West from Providence: 1846-1863 ===
The corridor from Providence, Rhode Island, west into New York was originally chartered as three companies. The Providence and Plainfield Railroad, chartered in June 1846, would run from Providence to the Rhode Island–Connecticut state line. The Hartford and Providence Railroad, incorporated in May 1847, would continue west to Hartford, Connecticut, and the New York and Hartford Railroad, chartered and incorporated in May 1845, would continue to the New York and Harlem Railroad at Brewster, New York. In 1849, the two Connecticut companies merged to form the Hartford, Providence and Fishkill Railroad, with a modified charter to continue past Brewster to Fishkill, New York, on the Hudson River, and in 1851 the Rhode Island company was merged into it. Later that year the first section opened, from Hartford east to Willimantic. Extensions opened east to Providence in 1854 and west to Waterbury in 1855. The HP&F went bankrupt on January 1, 1858, and was run by the trustees until 1863, when it was leased by the newly formed Boston, Hartford and Erie Railroad.

=== Southwest from Boston: 1847-1867 ===
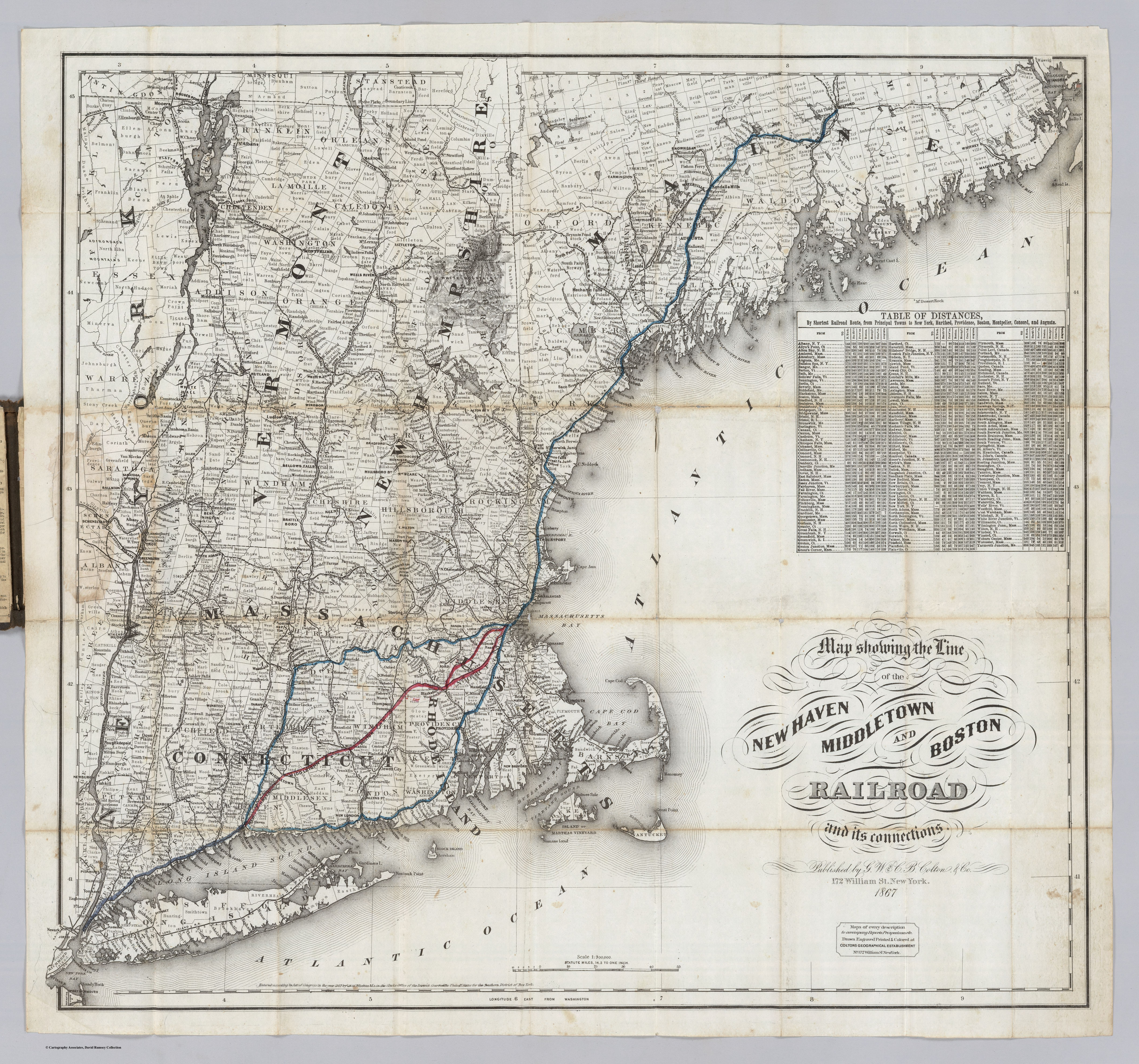
1867 New Haven, Middletown and Boston Railroad map

At the Boston end, the earliest predecessor was the Norfolk County Railroad, chartered April 24, 1847. The line from the Boston and Providence Railroad's branch at Dedham, Massachusetts, southwest to Walpole opened on April 23, 1849, and an extension to the Providence and Worcester Railroad in Blackstone opened May 16. The company went bankrupt soon after. The short Medway Branch Railroad was leased in 1851, opening December 29, 1852.

On May 1, 1849, the Southbridge and Blackstone Railroad was incorporated to extend the line west from Blackstone to Southbridge. The Midland Railroad was incorporated May 2, 1850, to build a new entrance to Boston, merging with the existing one south of Dedham. The two companies were consolidated with the Norfolk County Railroad on December 12, 1853, to form the Boston and New York Central Railroad, which had the intent of continuing southwest through Connecticut all the way to New York City. The first section of this extension was incorporated in May 1853 as the East Thompson Railroad, forming the Connecticut portion of the Southbridge and Blackstone.

The extension from Blackstone southwest to Mechanicsville, Connecticut, on the Norwich and Worcester Railroad was completed in 1853. In January 1855 the new main line to Boston was opened, but was closed six months later until December 1856 because of an injunction due to the danger of the numerous grade crossings. The new line ran to a terminal at the foot of Summer Street in downtown Boston via South Boston. The full line was first operated as one on June 1, 1855, but again failed quickly. On August 6 operations were restarted on only the original Dedham-Blackstone line, operated by the Boston and Providence Railroad as a branch. On March 2, 1857, the trustees took repossession, ending the operation by the B&P. The East Thompson Railroad leased the line, reopening it again in full for about a year before another failure. At that time, all but the original Dedham-Blackstone line and Medway Branch were closed until 1867. The closed lines were sold in November 1858 to the Midland Railroad, but were not operated due to bad condition. The Midland Land Damage Company tried again in 1862, changing its name to the Southern Midland Railroad in 1863 without success.

=== Combined routes from Providence and Boston: 1863-1898 ===
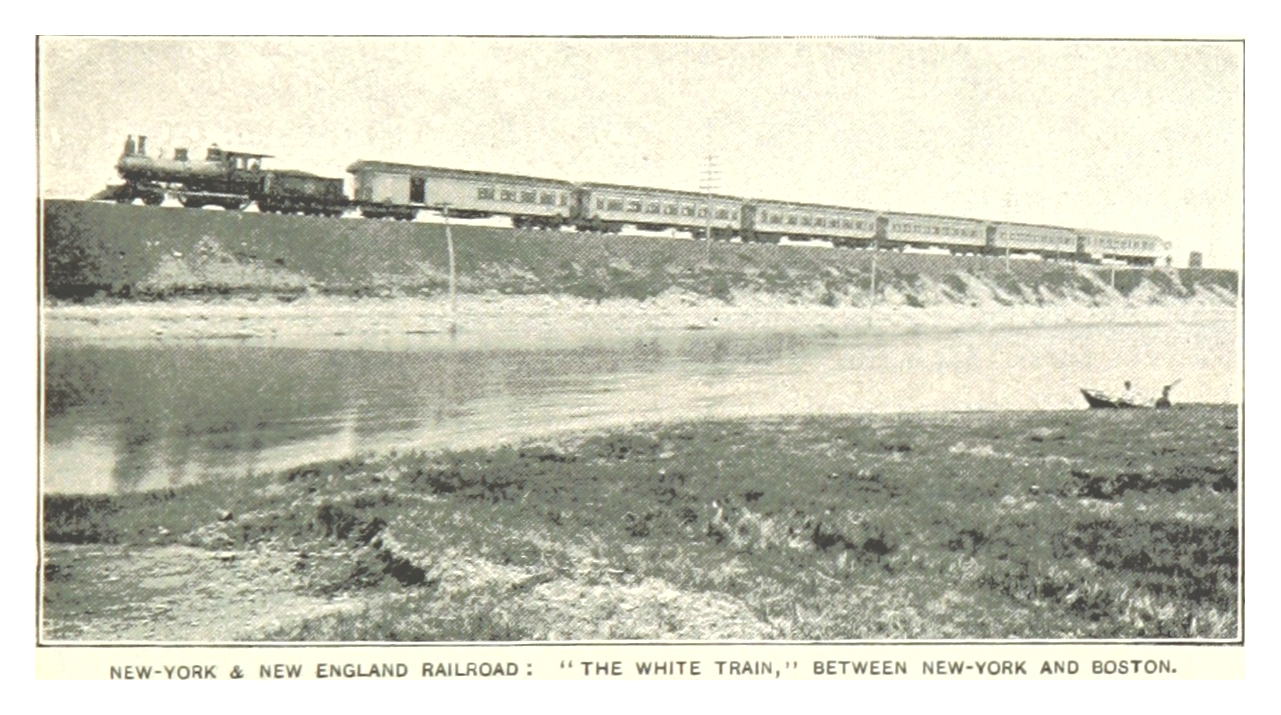
New York and New England Railroad's White Train between New York and Boston, c. 1890

In May 1863, the Boston, Hartford and Erie Railroad was chartered to take over operations of the failed lines and continue the line west to Fishkill, New York, with a car float from there to the Erie Railroad at Newburgh. It quickly leased the Hartford, Providence and Fishkill Railroad from its trustees, giving it a line from Providence west to Waterbury. In September of that year it acquired the former Boston and New York Central Railroad, but did not operate it yet; the old Norfolk County Railroad continued operations by its trustees.

In the meantime, the New York and Boston Railroad had built a line from Brookline, Massachusetts (outside Boston) southwest to Woonsocket, Rhode Island, crossing the Norfolk County Railroad in Blackstone. On January 4, 1865, the BH&E absorbed that company, making its Woonsocket Division. On December 13 of the same year, various Erie Railway men were elected to the BH&E board, placing it under partial control of the Erie.

On February 11, 1867, the BH&E leased the Norfolk County Railroad, finally reopening the full line from Mechanicsville to Boston. That same year, the branch to Southbridge (part of the original Southbridge and Blackstone charter) opened. The Norwich and Worcester Railroad was leased in 1869, finally giving it a route to Boston, using the N&W from the Providence line at Plainfield north to the old Norfolk County Railroad at Mechanicsville. In August 1872 a direct connection from Willimantic on the line to Providence northeast to Mechanicsville opened, completing the direct line to Boston. The Willimantic stop also afforded a transfer to the New London Northern Railroad for Palmer, Massachusetts, and Brattleboro, Vermont, to the north, and for New London to the south.

By 1869 the BH&E leased the Dutchess and Columbia Railroad, which was building a line roughly southwest-northeast in Dutchess County, New York. The BH&E planned to build west to the D&C at the future Hopewell Junction, but was not able to complete the line and lost the lease in 1870.

On September 9, 1872, the Long Island Rail Road's Boston Express began operations, using the BH&E from Norwich (at the south end of the N&W) to Boston. This was later replaced around 1891 with the Long Island and Eastern States Express, using the Danbury and Norwalk Railroad from Wilson Point to the BH&E (then the NY&NE) at Hawleyville (east of Danbury).

The New Haven, Middletown and Willimantic Railroad was leased in 1873, giving a line to New Haven. Later that year, the BH&E went bankrupt and was reorganized April 17 as the New York and New England Railroad; the N&W lease was kept but the NHM&W lease was forfeited (prior to its opening August 12), becoming part of the New York, New Haven and Hartford Railroad system in 1879.

Various sources note the Boston Hartford & Erie as failing and falling into receivership in 1870, yet it was during the Panic of 1873 that 89 of the country's 364 railroads went bankrupt. The New York and New England Railroad Company was chartered by special act of the Massachusetts legislature on April 17, 1873. Such was the mess of the Boston Hartford & Erie's mortgages and land titles that the NY&NE did not enter into possession of any of the BH&E "system" until sometime in 1875. Alvin F. Harlow in Steelways of New England states that the NY&NE did not get possession of the Hartford Providence & Fishkill line until 1877.

Through its entire existence (1873–1895) the NY&NE was always bedeviled by uncertainty in its land titles. Symptomatic of this: the $20 million common stock of the NY&NE originated as the $20,000,000 principal amount of the "Berdell Bonds"; the chartering legislation said the NY&NE was to "succeed to the rights of the Berdell Bondholders". There was a 10% assessment levied on the Berdell Bondholders as part of the chartering legislation, which also appropriated the necessary monies for the state to pay its assessment on its $3 million of Berdell Bonds. For some reason $1,000 of Berdell bonds were never issued so for years the NY&NE had $19.999 million of common stock outstanding.

Through all this the receivers of the BH&E and the later management of the NY&NE continued to hold on to the BH&E's Norwich & Worcester lease which was a major part, if not the principal prop to the entire system's existence. The N&W and its related Norwich Line steamers (passenger and freight) made money, enough that the NY&NE could afford to pay 8% (reduced from 10% by negotiation ca. 1885) on the N&W's capital stock.

In 1881 the extension from Waterbury west to Hopewell Junction on the Newburgh, Dutchess and Connecticut Railroad opened. Along with trackage rights over the ND&C southwest to Beacon, and a short line built by the NY&NE to the Hudson River at Beacon, this completed the main lines from Boston and Providence to the Hudson River, where a train ferry took cars to the New York, Lake Erie and Western Railroad's Newburg Branch at Newburgh. Part of the line in New York was built along the never-used grade from the failed Putnam and Dutchess Railroad.

Also in 1881 the New York, Westchester and Putnam Railway was completed, running north and east from New York City to the NY&NE at Brewster. This company had been previously involved with the BH&E in building a through line between New York and Boston, even being called the New York and Boston Railroad at first, and with its opening such a through line was formed. For some time such a traffic arrangement was made, lasting through the NYW&P's absorption into the New York Central Railroad in 1894.

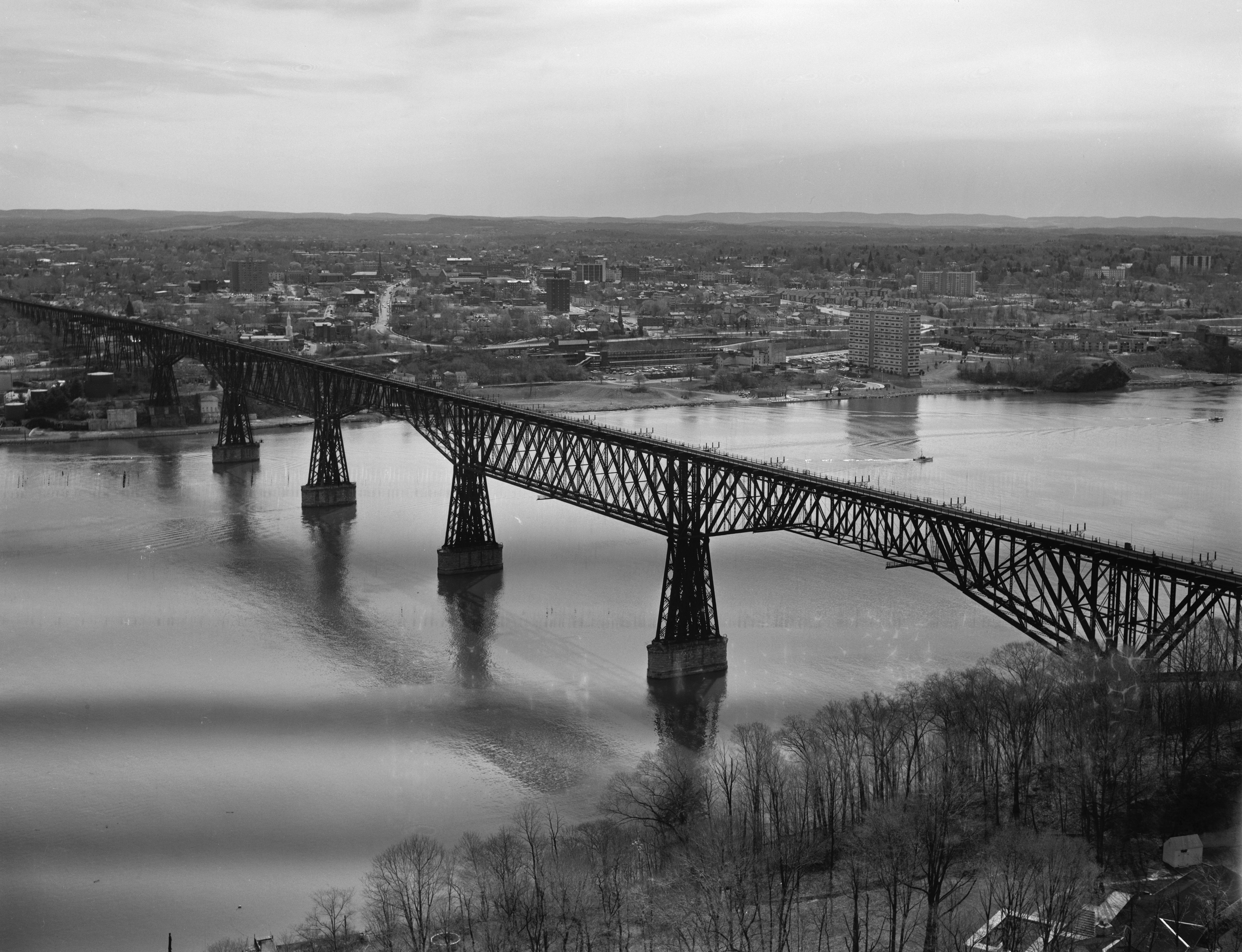
Poughkeepsie Bridge

The Poughkeepsie Bridge opened in 1888, providing a fixed crossing of the Hudson River at Poughkeepsie, north of the NY&NE car float at Beacon. The Central New England and Western Railroad, which owned the bridge, chartered the Dutchess County Railroad in 1890 and completed it in 1892, providing a branch from the bridge to the NY&NE at Hopewell Junction.

There was a December 31, 1883/January 1, 1884, receivership that got referred to at the time as the "Midnight Receivership" which featured the NY&NE officers trying to find a federal judge to issue a receivership order before the end of the year. This receivership was over by 1886.

Cyrus W. Field had become a major figure behind the NY&NE by 1886 but after the state of Massachusetts refused to sell him the $3 million in stock it held (instead disposing of the shares to a rival group because of concern about Field's close association with Jay Gould) Field sold his holdings in the NY&NE. The Massachusetts sale of NY&NE stock was part of a deliberate policy on the part of Massachusetts to get out of owning railroads; the sale of the Hoosac Tunnel line to the Fitchburg in 1887 was also done under this policy, a declared policy of Massachusetts Governor Andrew.

Jabez A. Bostwick

The new NY&NE President in 1887 was Jabez A. Bostwick, a Standard Oil partner of John D. Rockefeller. Rockefeller's brother William sat on the board of the New Haven. With Rockefeller lieutenants in both camps one wonders whether the NY&NE-NYNH&H "rivalry" may have been a Standard Oil "Divide & Conquer" policy to get low rates and other benefits out of both roads who together controlled nearly all rail business in New England south of the Boston and Albany Railroad (running through Massachusetts from Boston to Worcester, to Springfield, Pittsfield and on to Albany, New York).

The final bankruptcy of the NY&NE happened on December 27, 1893, and the company was reorganized on August 26, 1895, as the New England Railroad; Stuart Daggett in Railroad Reorganization states the 1895 NY&NE reorganization featured a hefty 20% assessment on NY&NE common. The New York, New Haven and Hartford Railroad leased the company for 99 years from July 1, 1898, at 3% on the preferred (normal dividend) and common stock. The New England Railroad was merged into the New Haven in 1908.

Many sources state that most of the NE stock had early on been acquired by the New Haven, probably bought in 1895 when NY&NE stockholders who did not want to forfeit their shares for non-assessment dumped their shares on the market. Baker in Formation of the New England Rail Systems claims there was a mini-Northern Pacific type corner in 1894 in NY&NE common when parties "Friendly" to the Boston & Albany tried to buy controlling influence in the NY&NE and the New Haven had to buy a large position in NY&NE common. Both parties apparently wound up together buying more NY&NE common than actually existed; worse, the New Haven had had to pay high prices for near worthless shares.

The most well-known and prestigious train of the New York & New England Railroad was the New England Limited of 1891, a crack Boston - New York passenger train. In 1891, the Pullman Palace Car Company refitted the train with luxurious new cars decorated in white and gold, inspiring the advertising department to call it the White Train and folks along the line to call it the Ghost Train as it sped through their towns after dark. It caught the romantic imagination of New Englanders and even after it was long gone, Lucius Beebe, a Bostonian and noted railroad writer, felt compelled to memorialize it. Famed author Rudyard Kipling memorialized the train in a popular verse:

Without a jar, or roll, or antic,
Without a stop to Willimantic,
The New England Limited takes its way
At three o'clock each day,
Maids and Matrons, daintily dimited,
Ride everyday on the New England Limited;
Rain nor snow ne'er stops its flight,
It makes New York at nine each night,
One half the glories have not been told
Of that wonderful train of white and gold
Which leaves each day for New York at three
Over the N.Y. & N.E.

=== New York, New Haven and Hartford Railroad: 1898-1969 ===
Much of the major foundation of the line of the NY & NE was the legacy of the Hartford, Providence and Fishkill Railroad, whose mainline ran from Providence, Rhode Island, west to Plainfield, Connecticut, to Willimantic, to Vernon, to Hartford, to New Britain, to Waterbury, to Danbury, and finally to Brewster, NY. Several portions of the line in Connecticut, including Danbury to Hawleyville and Waterbury to Bristol, were double-tracked in the late 1910s. This work included the construction of the Pequabuck Tunnel, which opened in 1910.

Until 1955 the NY, NH & H ran passenger trains from Boston to Blackstone, to Putnam, joining the above line at Willimantic and continually finally to Waterbury. This included the weekday limited stops Nutmeg train. The last remnant of service on this line was a Hartford-Waterbury segment that ended in the 1960s.

As time passed and sections were abandoned, the former NY&NE main lines became minor branches. In 1965, the city of Bristol, Connecticut, paid $15 million to build a new spur (partially using a segment of the pre-Pequabuck Tunnel mainline) to a new General Motors plant on Chippens Hill to convince the company to keep its operations in the city.

== Branches ==
In addition to the two main lines to Boston and Providence, splitting at Willimantic, numerous branches and auxiliary lines existed.

=== Dedham ===
The original Boston line ended at Dedham with a connection to the Boston and Providence Railroad. In 1883 what had become a branch to Dedham was abandoned. Prior to that, a new branch just to the east had been built in 1881, and was supplemented in 1890 by a connection to the south.

=== Medway ===
The Medway Branch Railroad from the main line at Norfolk west to Medway was incorporated in 1849 and opened in 1852, being immediately leased to the Norfolk County Railroad. It closed in 1864, two years after the New York and Boston Railroad reached Medway.

=== Valley Falls ===
The Rhode Island and Massachusetts Railroad was chartered in 1875 and opened in 1877, connecting the main Boston line at Franklin to the Providence and Worcester Railroad at Valley Falls. The New York and New England Railroad leased it in 1887.

=== Milford/Hopkinton/Ashland ===
The Milford and Woonsocket Railroad was incorporated in 1855 and opened a line from Milford to Bellingham in 1868. It was leased by the Providence and Worcester Railroad until 1883.

The Hopkinton Railway was organized in 1870 and opened in 1872, running from Milford north via Hopkinton to the Boston and Worcester Railroad at Ashland. The Providence and Worcester leased it until 1885. In 1884 the Milford and Woonsocket bought the Hopkinton, and the two ran as one.

The Milford, Franklin and Providence Railroad was organized in 1868 and opened in 1883, extending the line southeast from Milford to Franklin.

On April 1, 1897, the New England Railroad leased all three companies.

A short section from Franklin to Forge Park/495 is in use by MBTA Franklin/Foxboro Line service, while the section from Forge Park to Milford remains in freight use. From Milford to Ashland is abandoned and being converted to the Upper Charles [Rail] Trail. A 1.4-mile (2.3 km) segment of the Upper Charles Trail completed in 2011 uses the right-of-way from I-495 to the Hopkinton line. In July 2020, the state awarded $50,000 for design of the Trolley Brook Trail, a 1/2-mile (0.80 km) segment of rail trail on the right-of-way in Ashland. It will be the first segment of the 7 miles (11 km) of the trail in Ashland.

=== Woonsocket/Pascoag ===
The line eventually running from Brookline, Massachusetts, to Harrisville, Rhode Island, was originally built as a competitor to the NY&NE's Boston line. The first section opened in 1852 as part of the Charles River Railroad. It reached Woonsocket, Rhode Island, in 1863, and in 1891 the Woonsocket and Pascoag Railroad opened, continuing the line to the Providence and Springfield Railroad at Harrisville. In 1873 the NY&NE obtained the line to Woonsocket via a merger; on April 1, 1896, the New England Railroad leased the continuation past Woonsocket.

=== Providence and Springfield ===
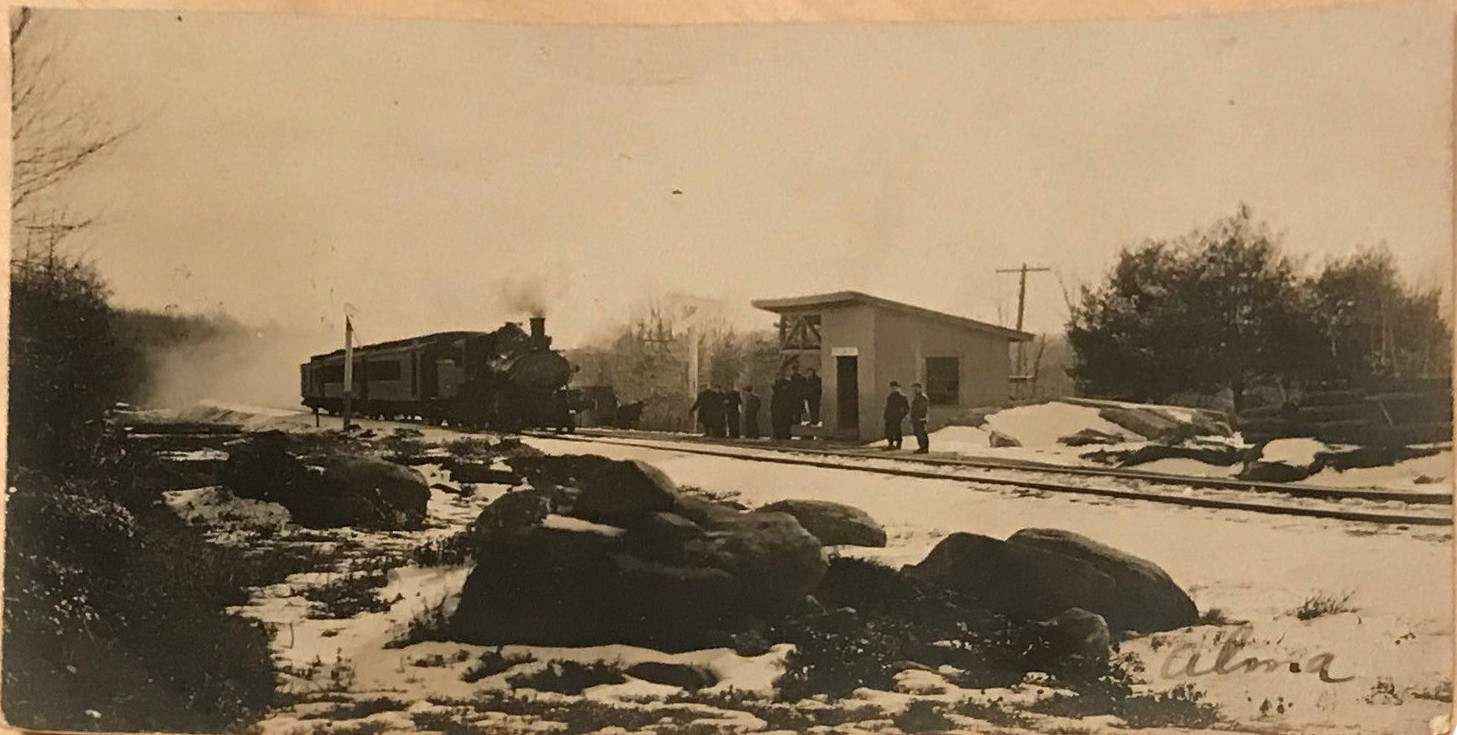
Wallum Lake station on the Providence and Springfield in 1909

The Providence and Springfield Railroad was chartered in 1853 and opened in 1873 from Providence, Rhode Island, northwest to Pascoag. An extension to Douglas Junction on the NY&NE main line in Massachusetts opened in 1893, and the New England Railroad leased the line on July 1, 1896.

=== Southbridge ===
The Southbridge Branch from East Thompson, Connecticut, to Southbridge, Massachusetts, was part of the original charter for the Southbridge and Blackstone Railroad, and opened in 1867, after it had been consolidated.

=== Pawtuxet Valley ===
The Pawtuxet Valley Railroad was organized in 1872 and opened and leased to the Hartford, Providence and Fishkill Railroad in 1874, running from the main line at River Point to Hope. The New York, Providence and Boston Railroad leased it in 1884 as a continuation of their Pontiac Branch Railroad.

=== Norwich and Worcester ===
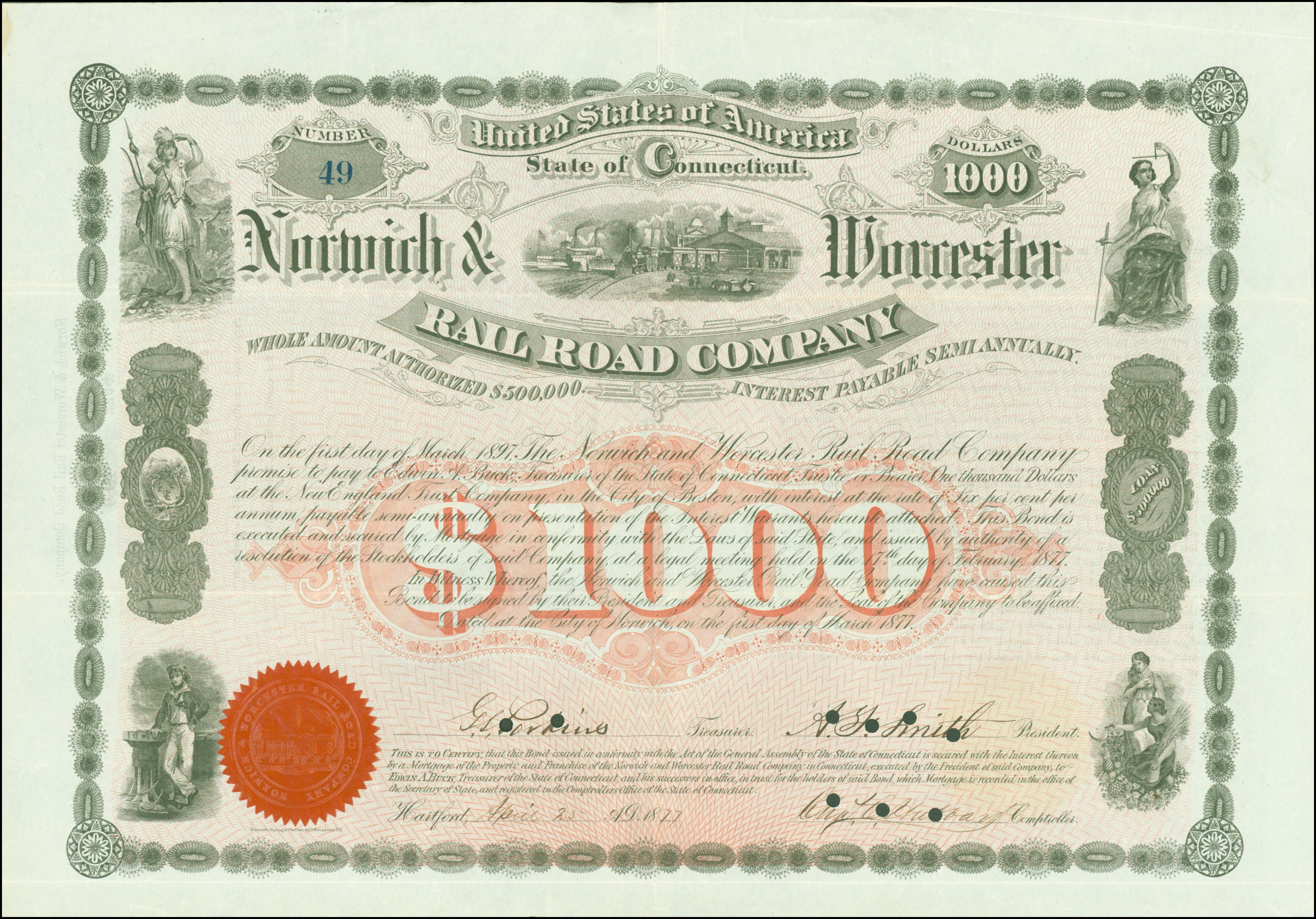
Bond of the Norwich & Worcester Rail Road Company, issued 1. March 1877

The Norwich and Worcester Railroad was an 1837 consolidation of the Boston, Norwich and New London Railroad Company of Connecticut and the Worcester and Norwich Railroad Company of Massachusetts when both state legislatures passed acts allowing the merger. Neither of these companies had built any railroad but the new one proceeded to build one from Norwich, Connecticut (later New London) north to Worcester, Massachusetts, including the Taft Tunnel at Lisbon, CT. The Boston, Hartford and Erie Railroad leased it in 1869, and the lease continued through the reorganizations. Connections were provided with the Providence line at Plainfield and the Boston line between Putnam and Mechanicsville. In 1886 the New England Railroad company renewed the lease that it acquired from the Boston, Hartford, and Erie.

Until 1955 the line served as the basis for Boston-bypassing run-through train, the East Wind from New York to Bangor, Maine, via the Norwich and Worcester line.

=== New Haven ===
The New Haven, Middletown and Willimantic Railroad opened and was leased to the Boston, Hartford and Erie Railroad in 1873. The BH&E went bankrupt later that year, as did the NHM&W in 1875. The NHM&W became part of the New York, New Haven and Hartford Railroad in 1879.

=== Rockville ===
The Rockville Railroad was incorporated in 1857 and opened and leased to the Hartford, Providence and Fishkill Railroad in 1863. It was a short branch from the main line at Vernon north and east to Rockville.

=== South Manchester ===
The South Manchester Railroad was chartered in 1866 and opened and leased to the Hartford, Providence and Fishkill Railroad in 1869. It was a short branch from the main line at Manchester south to South Manchester.

=== Springfield ===
The Connecticut Central Railroad was chartered in 1871, and its continuation in Massachusetts, the Springfield and New London Railroad, in 1874, to build a line from East Hartford to Springfield, with a branch to the Rockville Railroad at Westway. It opened in 1876 and was immediately leased by the Connecticut Valley Railroad, which gave up the lease to the New York and New England Railroad in 1880.

=== Connecticut River ===
The Meriden, Waterbury and Connecticut River Railroad was formed in 1888 as a consolidation of two smaller companies, opening in 1885 and 1888. The New York and New England Railroad leased it in 1892, as a branch from the main line in Waterbury east to Cromwell on the Connecticut River. The company went bankrupt and was reorganized in 1898 as the Middletown, Meriden and Waterbury Railroad, and was immediately leased by the New York, New Haven and Hartford Railroad.

== Station listing ==
State	Milepost	City	Station	Connections and notes
R.I.		Providence	Providence	Union Station serving all railroads in Providence
R.I.		Providence	Dike Street	junction with Providence and Springfield Railroad (NY&NE)
R.I.		Providence		junction with New York, Providence and Boston Railroad (NYNH&H), location: Garfield Avenue and Cranston Street
R.I.		Cranston	West Providence	
R.I.		Cranston	Cranston	
R.I.		Warwick	Natick	
R.I.		West Warwick	River Point	junction with Pawtuxet Valley Railroad (NYNH&H) and Pontiac Branch Railroad (NYNH&H)
R.I.		West Warwick	West Warwick	Presumed to serve village of Arctic? Possibility of station formally located at 15 Factory Street
R.I.		Coventry	Quidnick	
R.I.		Coventry	Anthony	Possibility of station formally located at Laural Avenue and Pilgrim Avenue
R.I.		Coventry	Washington	
R.I.		Coventry	Coventry	
R.I.		Coventry	Summit	
R.I.		Coventry	Greene	
Conn.		Sterling	Oneco	
Conn.		Sterling	Sterling	
Conn.		Plainfield	Moosup	
Conn.		Plainfield	Plainfield	junction with Norwich and Worcester Railroad (NY&NE)
Conn.		Canterbury	Canterbury	
Conn.		Lisbon	Lisbon	
Conn.		Sprague	Versailles	
Conn.		Sprague	Baltic	
Conn.		Scotland	Scotland	
Conn.		Windham	South Windham	
Conn.		Windham	Willimantic	junction with New London Northern Railroad (GT), NY&NE line to Boston and Boston and New York Air-Line Railroad (NYNH&H)
Conn.		Andover	Andover	
Conn.		Bolton	Bolton	
Conn.		Vernon	Vernon	junction with Rockville Railroad (NY&NE)
Conn.		Manchester	Manchester	junction with South Manchester Railroad (NY&NE)
Conn.		Manchester	Buckland	
Conn.		East Hartford	Burnside	
Conn.		East Hartford	East Hartford	junction with Connecticut Central Railroad (NY&NE)
Conn.		Hartford	Hartford	junction with Hartford and New Haven Railroad (NYNH&H), Central New England Railway (NYNH&H) and Hartford and Connecticut Valley Railroad (NYNH&H)
Conn.		West Hartford	Elmwood	
Conn.		Newington	Newington Junction	not a station junction with Hartford and New Haven Railroad (NYNH&H)
Conn.		Newington	Newington	
Conn.		New Britain	New Britain	junction with New Britain and Middletown Railroad (NYNH&H)
Conn.		Plainville	Plainville	junction with New Haven and Northampton Company (NYNH&H)
Conn.		Bristol	Forestville	
Conn.		Bristol	Bristol	
Conn.		Plymouth	Terryville	
Conn.		Waterbury	Waterbury	junction with Naugatuck Railroad (NYNH&H) and Middletown, Meriden and Waterbury Railroad (NYNH&H)
Conn.		Oxford	Towantic	
Conn.		Oxford	Oxford	
Conn.		Southbury	Southbury	
Conn.		Southbury	South Britain	
Conn.		Newtown	Sandy Hook	
Conn.		Newtown	Hawleyville	junction with Shepaug, Litchfield and Northern Railroad (NYNH&H) and Housatonic Railroad (NYNH&H)
Conn.		Brookfield	Berkshire Junction	not a station junction with New York, Housatonic and Northern Railroad (NYNH&H)
Conn.		Danbury	Danbury	junction with New York, Housatonic and Northern Railroad (NYNH&H) and Danbury and Norwalk Railroad (NYNH&H)
Conn.		Danbury	Mill Plain	
N.Y.		Brewster	Brewster	junction with New York and Putnam Railroad (NYC) and New York and Harlem Railroad (NYC)
N.Y.		Towner's	Towners	bridge over New York and Harlem Railroad (NYC)
N.Y.		Hopewell Junction	Hopewell Junction	junction with Newburgh, Dutchess and Connecticut Railroad (NYNH&H) and Dutchess County Railroad (NYNH&H)

=== Boston line ===
For stations between Boston and Readville, see Fairmount Line. For the line those between Dedham and Blackstone, see Norfolk County Railroad.

State	Milepost	City	Station	Connections and notes
Mass.		Douglas	East Douglas	
Mass.		Douglas	Douglas	
Mass.		Douglas	Douglas Junction	not a station junction with Providence and Springfield Railroad (NY&NE)
Conn.		Thompson	East Thompson	junction with Southbridge Branch
Conn.		Thompson	Thompson	
Conn.		Thompson	Mechanicsville	not a station original junction with Norwich and Worcester Railroad (NY&NE)
Conn.		Putnam	Putnam	junction with Norwich and Worcester Railroad (NY&NE)
Conn.		Pomfret	Pomfret	
Conn.		Pomfret	Abington	
Conn.		Pomfret	Elliott	
Conn.		Hampton	Hampton	
Conn.		Hampton	Clarks Corner	
Conn.		Windham	North Windham	
Conn.		Windham	Willimantic	junction with New London Northern Railroad (GT), NY&NE line to Providence and Boston and New York Air-Line Railroad (NYNH&H)

== Modern-day usage ==
Within the last 10 years, funds have been set aside for a rails to trails conversion. As January 2014, the easternmost segments spanning from Garfield Avenue/Cranston Street (near Amtrak's Northeast Corridor), West Warwick (former Riverpoint/Hope Railway spur point) and Coventry have continuous pavement totaling to approximately 14.2 miles

== See also ==
- Airline State Park
- Edson Joseph Chamberlin
