= Pequabuck Tunnel =

Railroad tunnel in Plymouth, Connecticut

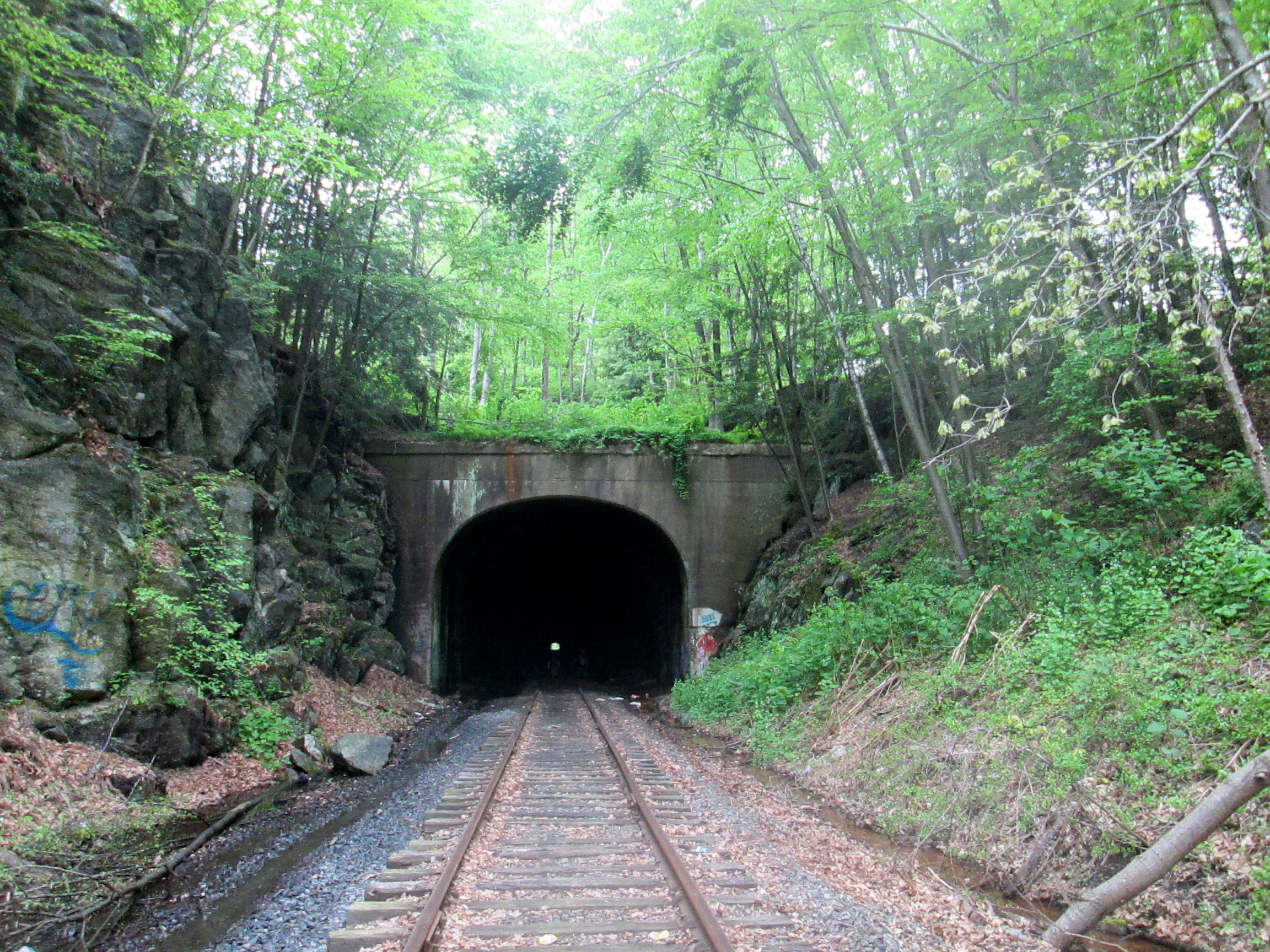
View of the tunnel from the Tunnel Road end in Plymouth

The Pequabuck Tunnel, also known as the Terryville Tunnel, is a railroad tunnel in Plymouth and Pequabuck, Connecticut. It is located on a still-active segment of the Hartford, Providence and Fishkill Railroad used by freight trains running between New Britain and Waterbury. Although locally known as the Mile Long Tunnel, the Pequabuck Tunnel is just 3,580 feet long – 0.68 miles. The tunnel is 32 feet wide and 26 feet tall, with regularly spaced recesses in the walls to allow a person to seek safety while a train passes.

== History ==
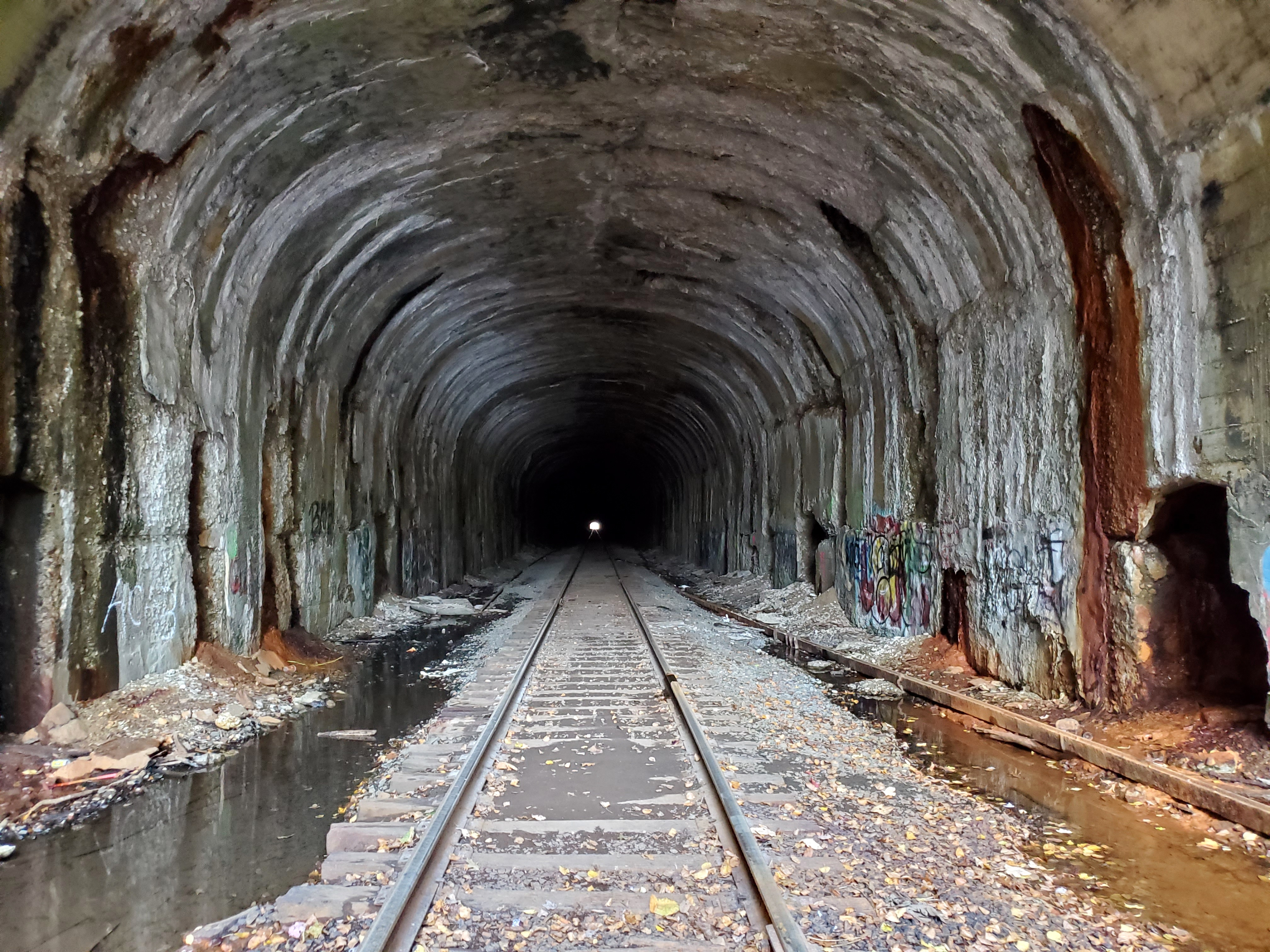
Interior of the tunnel in 2022

The section of the Hartford, Providence & Fishkill between Hartford and Waterbury opened in July 1855. The route was twisty owing to the hilly terrain.

Construction of the tunnel through Sylvan Hill in Plymouth began in 1906, but temporarily stopped in 1907 due to financial issues. Despite a cave-in in July 1908, the tunnel was completed in 1910. The first passenger train through the tunnel ran on January 27, 1911. The Pequabuck station (signed as Terryville) was located near the east portal of the tunnel.

As passenger service began to decline, the second track was removed in 1939 and the remaining track was moved to the center of the tunnel a year later. Through service on the entire Hartford, Providence & Fishkill ended in the 1920s, but passenger service on the Hartford-Waterbury segment lasted until 1962. In the last years of service, the Pequabuck station was only open on Saturday mornings.

Although passenger service no longer operates on the line, it is still used for freight service by Pan Am Southern. The possibility exists for the restoration of passenger service on the Hartford-Waterbury route, which would include the first regularly scheduled passenger trains through the tunnel in more than a half-century.
