= Southbridge Branch (New England) =

Railway line in Connecticut and Massachusetts

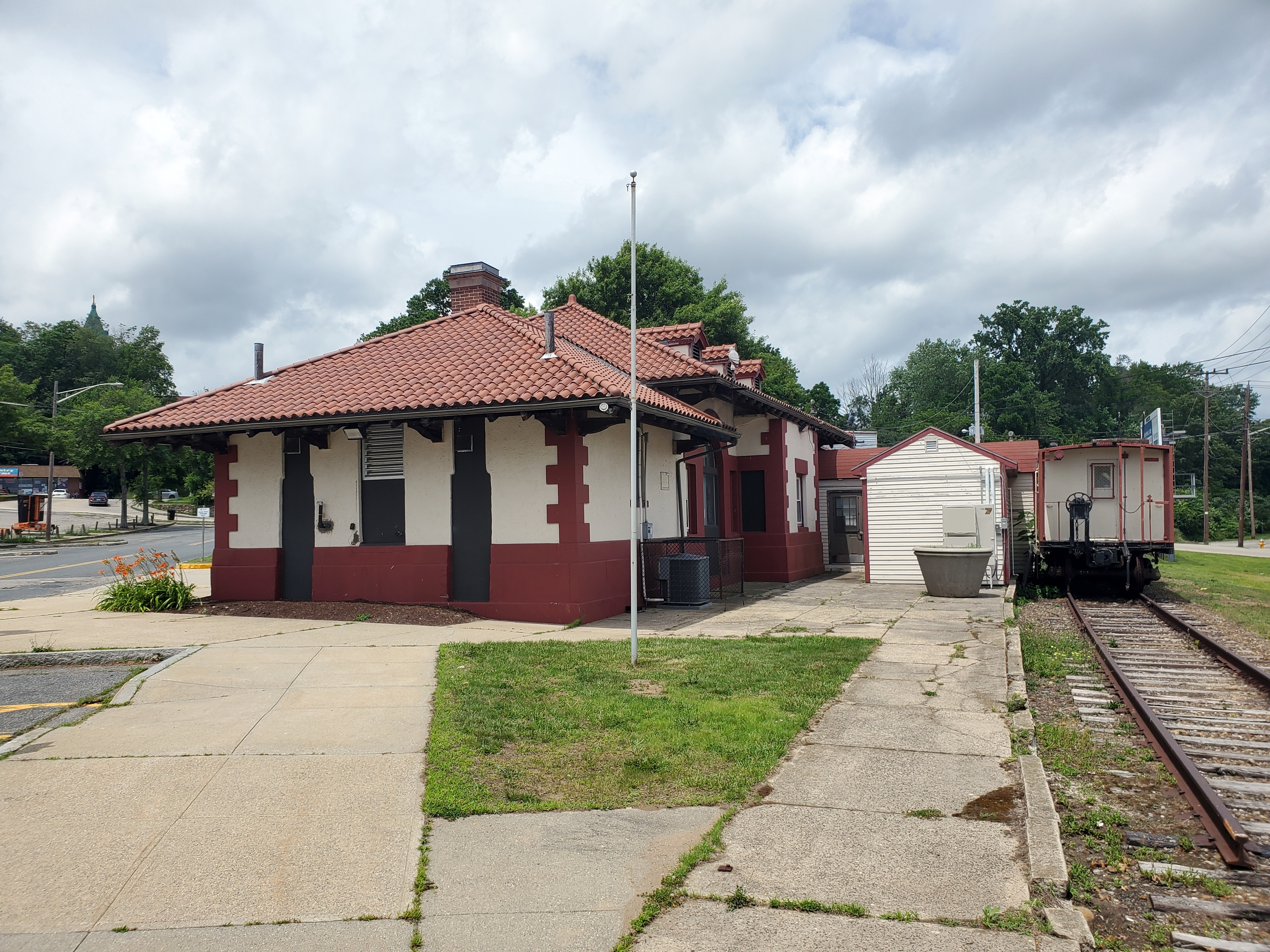
- Southbridge station, the western terminus of the line

Overview
- Termini: Southbridge, Massachusetts; East Thompson, Connecticut
- Stations: 10

History
- Opened: Early 1866
- Completed: February 1867
- Closed: 1937 (eastern portion); 1980s (western portion)

Technical
- Line length: 16.9 mi (27.2 km)
- Track gauge: 1,435 mm (4 ft 8 1/2 in) standard gauge

The Southbridge Branch was a railway line in Connecticut and Massachusetts, United States. It ran 16.9 miles (27.2 km) between Southbridge, Massachusetts and East Thompson, Connecticut, via Webster, Massachusetts. Originally planned to be part of the Southbridge and Blackstone Railroad, it was ultimately built in 1866–67 by the Boston, Hartford and Erie Railroad. It became part of the New York and New England Railroad in 1875, and the New York, New Haven and Hartford Railroad in 1898. Passenger service ended in 1930, and the eastern portion of the line was abandoned in 1937. The western half continued to be used for freight service; it passed to Penn Central in 1969, and to the Providence and Worcester Railroad (P&W) in 1976 as the Southbridge Running Track. The P&W stopped serving the line in the 1980s, but did not abandon it until 2004. Much of the western half of the line in Massachusetts has been converted to the Quinebaug Valley Rail Trail.

== History ==
=== Formation ===
When chartered on May 1, 1849, the Southbridge and Blackstone Railroad was intended to run between Southbridge, Massachusetts, and Blackstone, Massachusetts, where it would connect with the Norfolk County Railroad to reach Boston. The promoters of the line may have intended to ultimately extend it west to the Hoosac Tunnel. The incomplete line became part of the Boston and New York Central Railroad (B&NYC) in 1853. The B&NYC opened its line from Mechanicsville, Connecticut to Blackstone in 1854, using the route east of East Thompson, Connecticut.

After years of financial struggle, the line was purchased by the Boston, Hartford and Erie Railroad (BH&E) in 1863. After finally obtaining control of the Norfolk County Railroad, the BH&E set out to complete the planned Southbridge–East Thompson section. Passenger service on the first portion between Webster, Massachusetts, and East Thompson began in early 1866. The final spike of the western portion was driven on November 9, 1866, and service began the next February. The line was operated as part of a Southbridge–Boston mainline from then until September 1868, when the East Thompson–Mechanicsville section reopened, at which time it was relegated to branchline status as the Southbridge Branch.

=== Successor lines ===
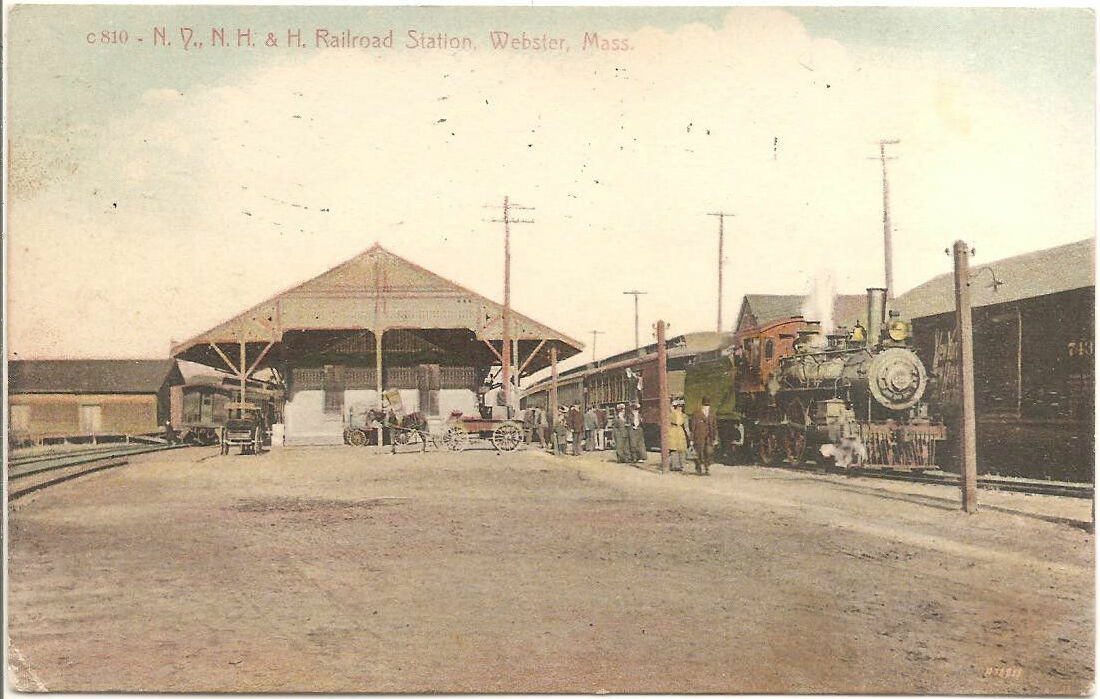
Early-20th-century postcard of Webster station with the Southbridge Branch at far left

The BH&E extended the original line west from Mechanicsville to Willimantic, Connecticut in August 1872. The Boston and New York Air-Line Railroad opened to Willimantic in 1873, completing the "Midland Route" between New York City and Boston and leaving the Southbridge Branch as a minor spur line. The bankrupt BH&E was acquired by the New York and New England Railroad (NY&NE) in 1875. A Southbridge Branch freight was one of four trains involved in the Great East Thompson Train Wreck on December 4, 1891.

The New England Railroad, successor to the NY&NE, was merged into the New York, New Haven and Hartford Railroad in 1898. In 1904, the New Haven resumed service on a previously built extension of the Providence and Springfield Railroad from Pascoag, Rhode Island, to Douglas, Massachusetts. It was soon through-routed with the Southbridge Branch to form a Southbridge–Providence service. In 1915, daily service on the line included two Providence–Southbridge round trips (all with Boston connections at East Thompson) plus three Webster–Southbridge round trips that did not run on Sundays.

Service on part of the Providence and Springfield line ended by 1921. In 1924, the line had two daily East Thompson–Southbridge round trips, run by a gas-powered railcar, with Boston connections at East Thompson. This was reduced to a single daily round trip in July 1930, and ended entirely on August 16. The stations at Quinebaug, Sandersdale, and Webster were all demolished in 1936; the roundhouse was removed that August. The last freight use of the East Thompson–Webster segment took place when the March 1936 floods cut off access to Webster on the Groton–Worcester line. That segment was abandoned the next year.

=== Abandonment and rail trail ===
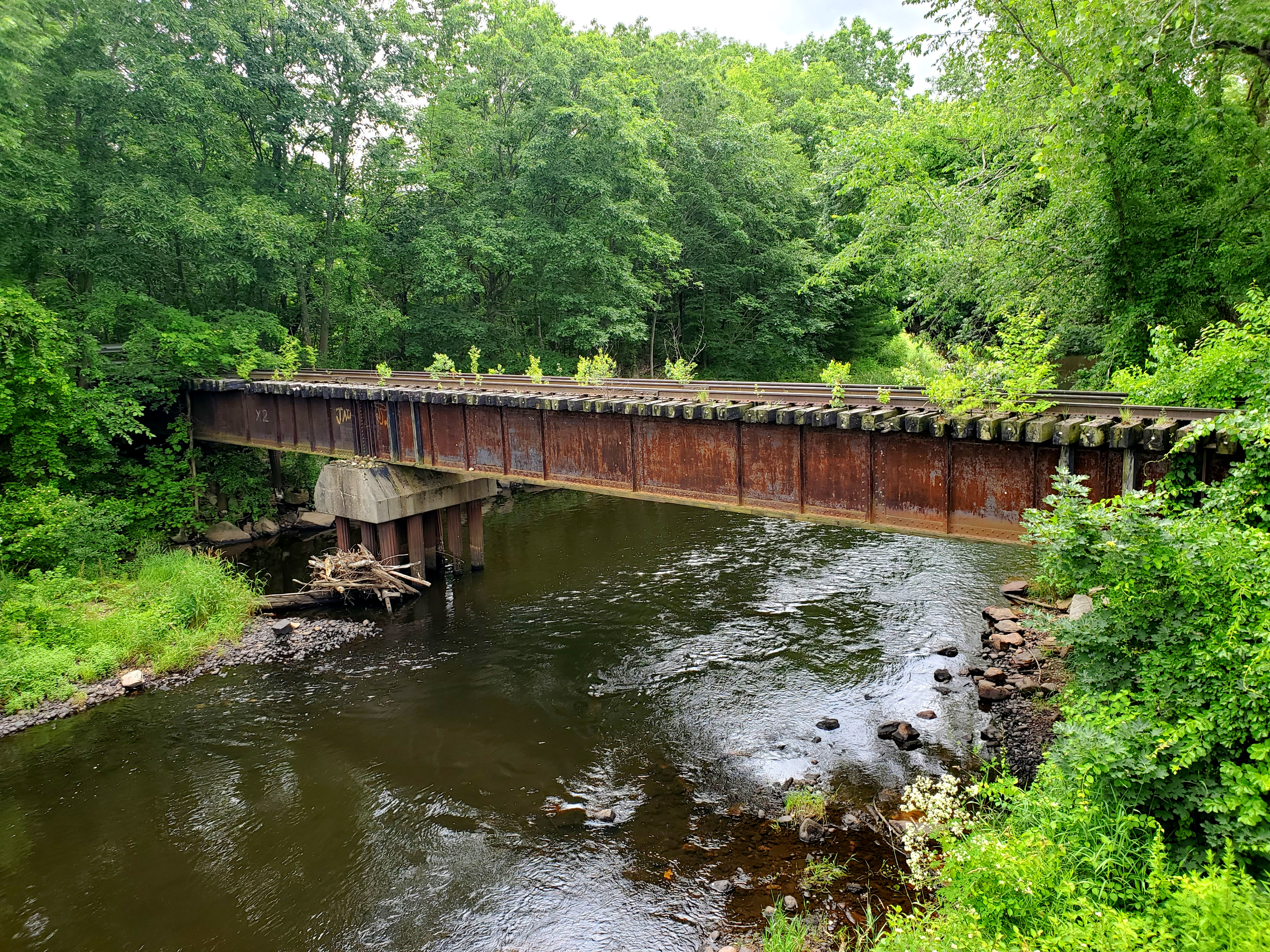
Abandoned bridge over the Quinebaug River in West Dudley seen in 2021

Freight service continued on the Southbridge–Webster portion as a branch of the Groton–Worcester line. It became part of Penn Central in 1969. The line had only one freight train a week; Penn Central applied for abandonment, and it was not recommended for inclusion in Conrail. Instead, the Providence and Worcester Railroad (P&W) took over the branch along with the northern portion of the Groton–Worcester line in 1976. P&W service on the branch ended in 1988, though rails remained in place. The bridge over Massachusetts Route 131 in Southbridge was removed in 2001. P&W applied in 2003 for abandonment of the Southbridge Running Track, which was granted the next year.

The Massachusetts portions of the line west of Webster were purchased by the state government in 2004 for conversion to a rail trail. Attempts by P&W to sell the Connecticut portion to the state government were unsuccessful. The first 4.1 miles (6.6 km) of the Quinebaug Valley Rail Trail, from Sandersdale to the state line, was completed in the early 2010s. An additional 1.5 miles (2.4 km) in Dudley was completed around 2016. In June 2022, the U.S. Department of Commerce Economic Development Administration awarded Southbridge a $2.6 million grant to complete the downtown Southbridge section of the trail. The total cost including state and local funding was expected to be $4.3 million.

== Route ==
Map of the Southbridge Branch

The Southbridge Branch was 16.9 miles (27.2 km) long. From the western terminal at Southbridge, it ran southeast along the Quinebaug River valley through the villages of Sandersdale and West Dudley, crossing the state line into the village of Quinebaug, Connecticut. It turned northeast and crossed back into Massachusetts, where it crossed the French River and paralleled the Norwich and Worcester Railroad into downtown Webster. It crossed the river twice more into Dudley and back into Webster, then turned southeast to pass Lake Chaubunagungamaug. Crossing again into Connecticut, it joined the Midland Division at East Thompson station. Trackage continued west a short distance from Southbridge station to serve industrial customers. A freight house and three-stall roundhouse were located on this trackage, as was a connection to the Worcester Consolidated Street Railway.

=== Stations ===
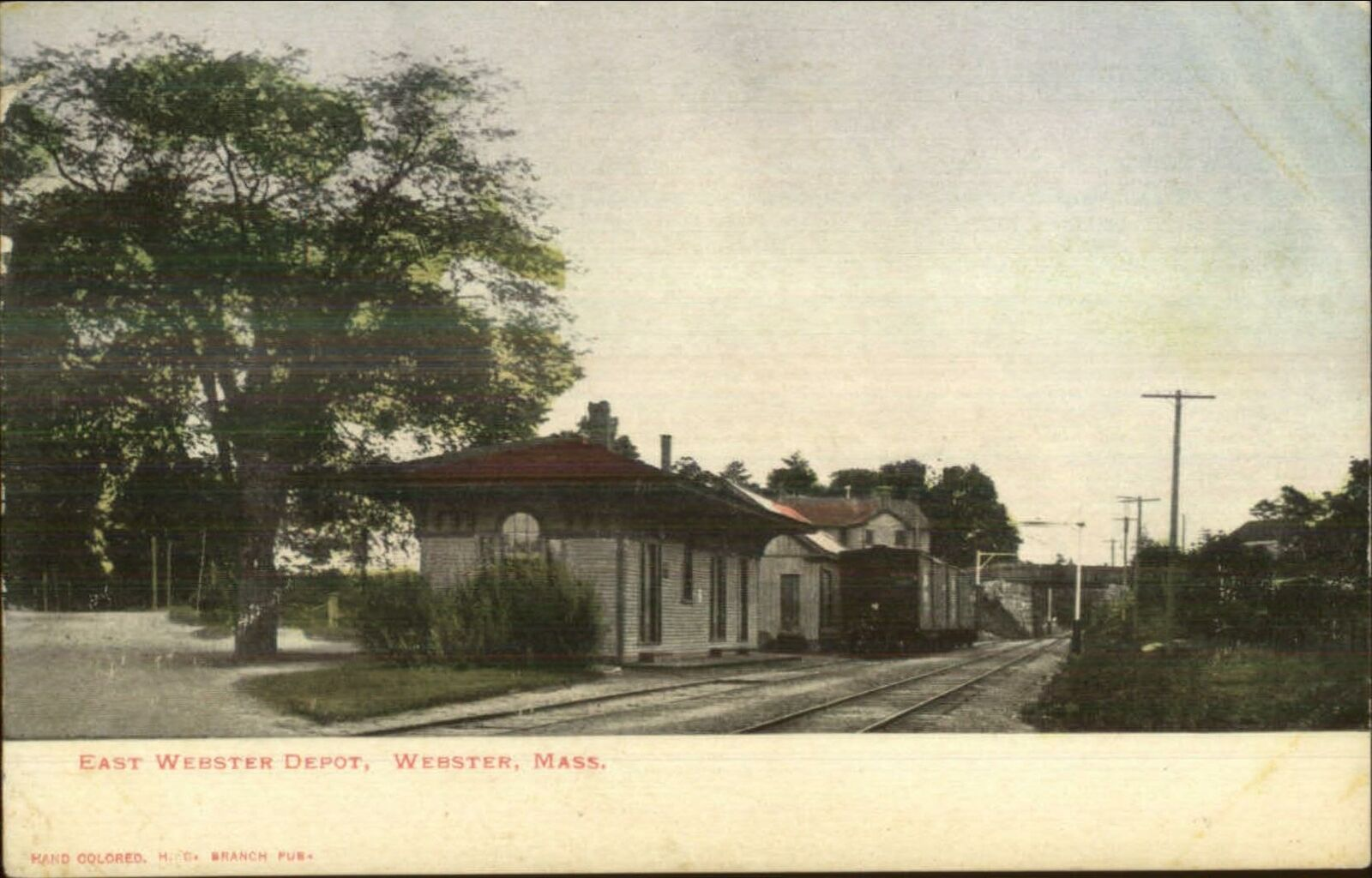
Early-20th-century postcard of East Webster station

The line had ten passenger stations, two of which were shared with other lines. The 1910-built Southbridge station is the only extant station building on the line. It was added to the National Register of Historic Places in 1989 and has been converted for non-railroad use.

| State | Location | Station | Miles (km) | Connecting lines |
|---|---|---|---|---|
| MA | Southbridge | Southbridge | 0.0 (0.0) | |
| MA | Southbridge | Sandersdale | 1.6 (2.6) | |
| MA | Dudley | West Dudley | 3.4 (5.5) | |
| CT | Thompson | Quinebaug | 5.9 (9.5) | |
| MA | Webster | Webster | 11.1 (17.8) | Norwich and Worcester Railroad |
| MA | Webster | East Webster | 12.0 (19.4) | |
| MA | Webster | Beacon Park | 13.1 (21.1) | |
| MA | Webster | Point Pleasant | 14.1 (22.7) | |
| CT | Thompson | Bates Crossing | 15.0 (24.2) | |
| CT | Thompson | East Thompson | 16.9 (27.2) | Midland Division |
