= Central New England Railroad =

Shortline railroad in Connecticut

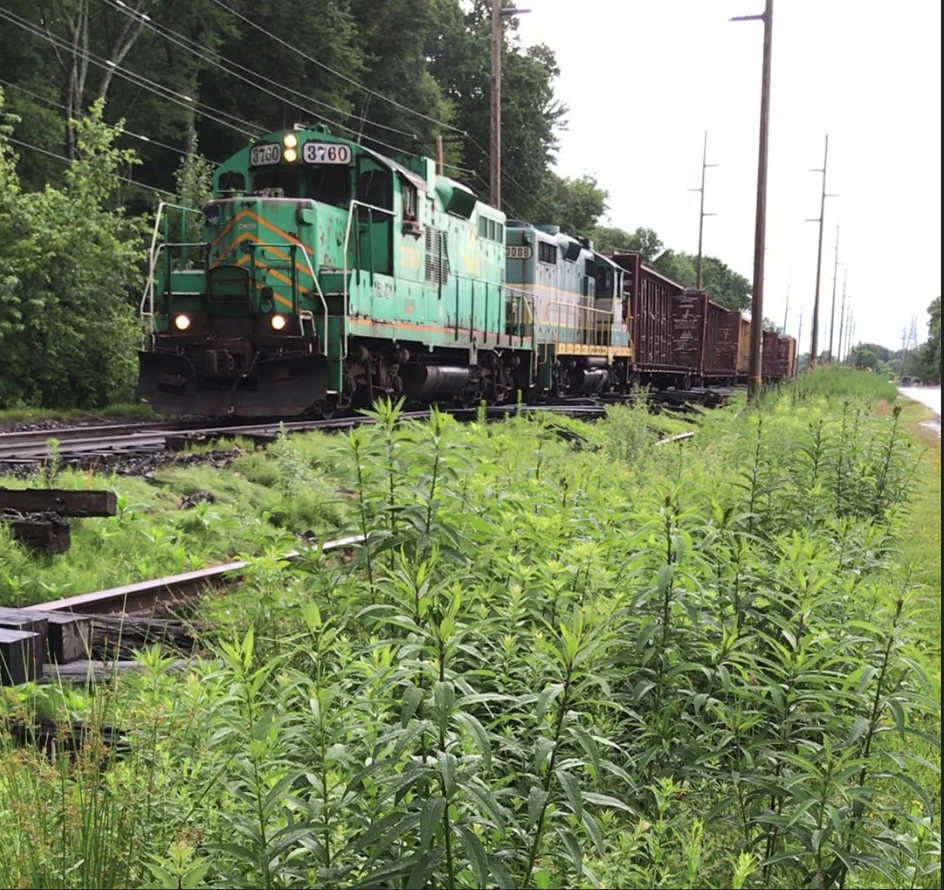
- A CNZR train of empty lumber cars heading southbound in Bloomfield, CT, led by GP20 #3760 and GP9 #3006.

Overview
- Headquarters: Windsor, Connecticut
- Reporting mark: CNZR
- Locale: Hartford, Connecticut, U.S.
- Dates of operation: 1995–present
- Predecessors: Conrail, Pan Am Railways

Technical
- Track gauge: 4 ft 8 1/2 in (1,435 mm) standard gauge
- Length: 22.2 miles (35.7 km)

Other
- Website: cnzrrr.com

The Central New England Railroad (reporting mark CNZR) is a railroad in and near Hartford, Connecticut. It began operations in 1995 on former Conrail trackage.

Central New England Railroad operates the Griffins Secondary between Hartford and Bloomfield. The railroad also operated the Armory Branch between East Windsor Hill and the Massachusetts state line until the end of 2025. Both lines are owned by the State of Connecticut and are or were operated under lease agreements.

== Lines Operated ==
=== Armory Branch ===
The 13.5-mile (21.7 km) Armory Branch currently extends from East Windsor Hill to the Massachusetts state line in Enfield. This line was originally constructed by the Connecticut Central Railroad between 1874 and 1876, connecting Hartford and Springfield, Massachusetts. In 1895, the Armory Branch came under the control of the New York, New Haven and Hartford Railroad, which at its peak controlled nearly all freight rail traffic in Connecticut. Following the New Haven's bankruptcy in 1961, Penn Central took over operations in 1969, followed by Conrail in 1976, which sold the line beyond Hazardville to Guilford Transportation in 1982. Guilford discontinued service in 1993 and abandoned its portion of line, and the trackage north of the Connecticut state line was torn up. Meanwhile, Conrail continued operations on its portion of the line, though it abandoned the tracks between South Windsor and East Windsor in 1986.

After these abandonments, the State of Connecticut took control of the portion of the line within the state (both the trackage formerly operated by Conrail and by Guilford) and leased operation to the Connecticut Southern Railroad from Hartford to East Windsor, and to the Central New England Railroad from East Windsor to the end of track in Enfield. The trackage previously abandoned was put back into service from South Windsor to Scantic, while the rest of the line to the state line in Enfield remains out of service as of 2021. CNZR has begun reconstructing the line to Enfield in hopes of resuming freight service to customers in Enfield in the next few years.

Primary commodities carried on the Armory Branch were fertilizer and bricks. The railroad interchanged with Connecticut Southern in East Windsor.

The Central New England Railroad concluded operations of the Armory Branch on December 31, 2025, with Connecticut Southern Railroad assuming operations the following day.

==== Proposed abandonment ====
The town of Enfield and local advocates proposed in April 2021 to have both the active portion of the line and the out of service tracks north of Scantic abandoned and converted into a rail trail. An alternate proposal is to instead construct a rails with trails project. Trail proponents including state representative Carol Hall argue that the line does not have sufficient business to justify its continued use, and would better serve the community as a trail. State representative Tom Arnone and Enfield's development services director noted that while there is currently little business on the line, there are several potential rail customers, including an oil company and a Martin-Brower distribution facility. The fate of the line will be decided by the state of Connecticut in 2022 when the current lease expires.

=== Griffins Secondary ===
The Griffins Secondary begins just north of Hartford Union Station and terminates just past Day Hill Road in Windsor, Connecticut. This line was originally built by the Connecticut Western Railroad between 1869 and 1871, as part of their line that originally reached Poughkeepsie, New York. After several changes in ownership, including 6 years by the original Central New England Railway from 1898, the New Haven Railroad assumed control in 1904. Between 1937 and 1938, the tracks between Simsbury and Griffins were abandoned, leaving the remaining line a spur out of Hartford. The remaining trackage passed to Penn Central with the rest of the New Haven in 1971, and after objections by local shippers to its proposed abandonment in 1976, Conrail assumed control. The state of Connecticut bought the right-of-way in 1981, and first assigned operations to the Boston and Maine. B&M ceased to operate the line after a few years, and it laid dormant until 1994 when the state of Connecticut began repairs to return the line to service. Following the completion of repairs, the state designated the Central New England Railroad as the new operator in 1999.

The sole customer on the Griffins line is a Home Depot distribution center in Bloomfield which receives inbound shipments of lumber. Interchange is with Pan Am in Hartford.

The Griffins Secondary has largely been dormant since Home Depot relocated its distribution center in 2021.
