= South Manchester Railroad =

Defunct railroad in Connecticut

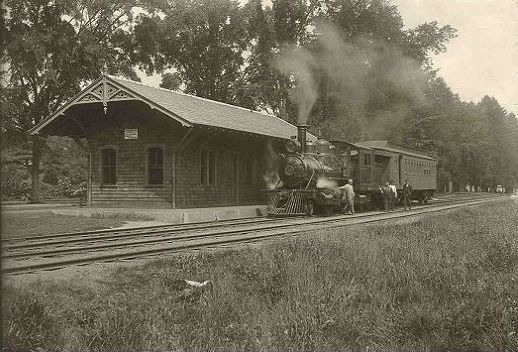
South Manchester Railroad at the corner of Hartford Road and Elm Street near Cheney Hall

The South Manchester Railroad (SMRR, also known as the Cheney Railroad or Cheney's Goat) was a short-line railroad serving Manchester, Connecticut. The railroad formed in 1866 and opened a two mile long line between the Cheney brothers' mills and the existing Hartford, Providence and Fishkill Railroad (HP&F) main line in 1869. Operations were initially by the HP&F, but a decade later the Cheneys purchased the line back and ran it themselves as they were unhappy with the HP&F's service.

In 1933 passenger service was ended and ownership and operations transferred to the New York, New Haven and Hartford Railroad (the New Haven), successor to the HP&F. Freight operations continued under the New Haven and its successor Penn Central before being ended by later successor Conrail in 1981 due to low freight demand. The line was formally abandoned in 1986. The Cheney Rail Trail has been established over most of the former railroad.

== History ==
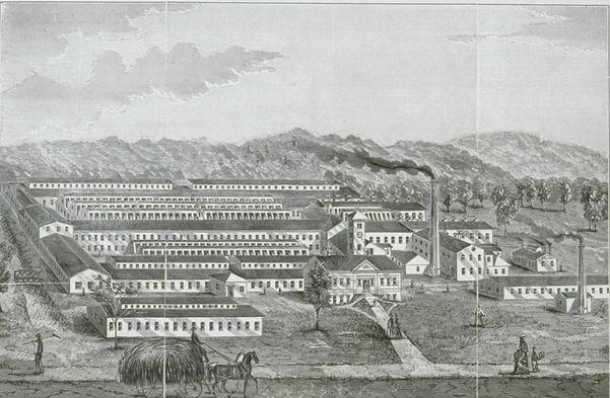
Mills of the Cheney Brothers along Hop Brook, Manchester, around 1876

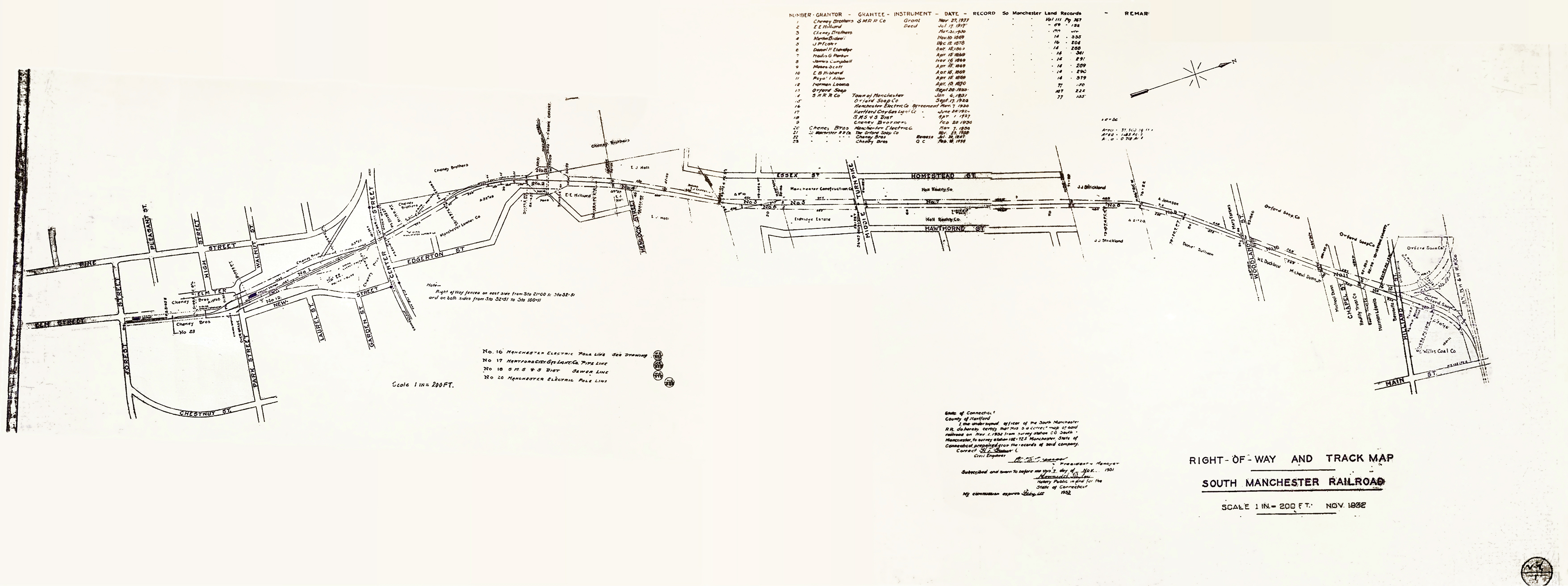
Right-of-Way and Track Map, November 1932

The incorporation of the railroad occurred on 30 May 1866, and three years later, the Cheney brothers (known at the time for their success in the silk industry) finished construction. When finished, the two-mile-long railroad was the only line in the United States to be owned by a family rather than a company. It was used as a method to send silk products from their mill in Manchester to the other mill, based in Hartford. Some of the workers also used the rail as a way to get to the mills for a low fare, but most lived in houses located on the property.

In 1914 an innovative collision prevention device was successfully tested on the South Manchester Railroad after president Mollen had offered a prize to the inventor of a device that would automatically stop trains who approached each other on the same track. The rail track was wired, and a system of batteries was attached to the locomotive, which threw over the throttle, applied the air brakes and thus stopped the train, when the axles of another train produced an electrical short cut between the rails.

The railway provided its services not only to Cheney's employees. For instance, it was used by students from the South End to travel to Hartford Public High School, before Manchester High School was built in 1904. It transported theatergoers to Cheney Hall, and businessmen to the silk shows there. The train also ran on Sundays taking people to the Catholic church at the north end and the schedule was irregular, depending on the time the priest set for masses. On special occasions, up to 3500 passengers per day, paid ten cents a trip. The railway also transported coal to paper mills in the south end of town, as well as farm produce and supplies from south to north.

During the Great Depression in the 1930s, the Cheney brothers began to sell most of their assets. The railroad was part of their liquidation. The final passenger trip occurred in 1933, and shortly afterwards the railroad was sold to the New York, New Haven and Hartford Railroad, which connected to the line in Manchester. The New Haven continued to operate freight service until its merger into Penn Central at the end of 1968. Penn Central in turn operated the line until it was included in Conrail in 1976. Conrail ended freight service on the line in 1981, before formally abandoning it in 1986.

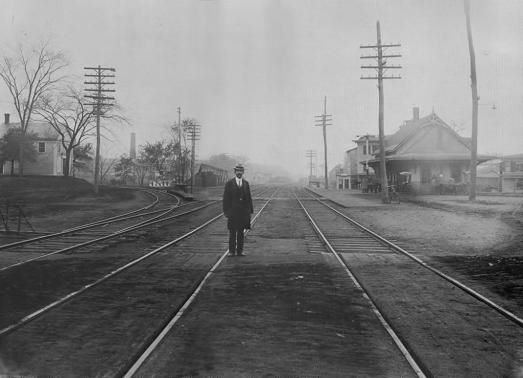
North End of the South Manchester Railroad, approx. 1900

== South Manchester Railroad Station ==
The station was built in 1879, with its purpose being for freight and general use. It was located at the corner of Park Street and Elm Terrace.

== Locomotives ==
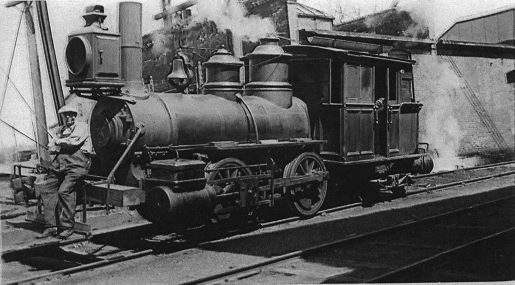
Steam locomotive 'Mt. Nebo'

A 0-4-4 steam locomotive named 'Mt. Nebo' was supplied in 1879 by Baldwin Locomotive Works in Philadelphia, Pennsylvania. It was designed and patented by Matthias Nace Forney for hauling both freight and passengers.

== Present-day ==
In 2005, one mile of the railroad was purchased by the Manchester Land Conservation Trust. The route is a pedestrian path, known as the Cheney Rail Trail.
