= Forestville station =

- Forestville Passenger Station
- U.S. National Register of Historic Places
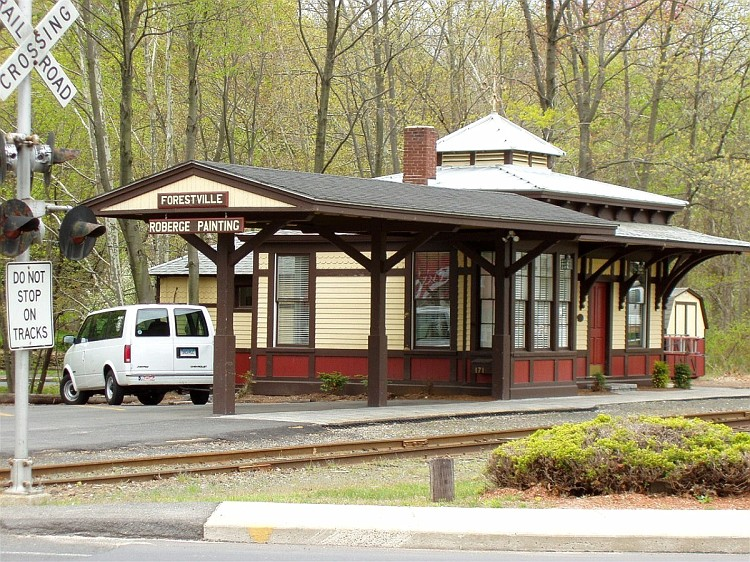
- Forestville station in 2008
- Interactive map of Forestville Passenger Station
- Location: 171 Central Street, Forestville, Connecticut
- Coordinates: 41°40′24″N 72°53′54″W
- Area: 0.3 acres (0.12 ha)
- Built: 1881
- Architectural style: Queen Anne
- NRHP reference No.: 78002862
- Added to NRHP: April 19, 1978

Forestville station is a former train station located off 171 Central Street in the Forestville village of Bristol, Connecticut. It was built in 1881 by the New York and New England Railroad, and was a key element of the prosperity of the village, benefiting from many daily passenger rail stops. Service to the area ended in 1960. The station, now repurposed to other uses, was added to the National Register of Historic Places on April 19, 1978 as Forestville Passenger Station.

== Description and history ==
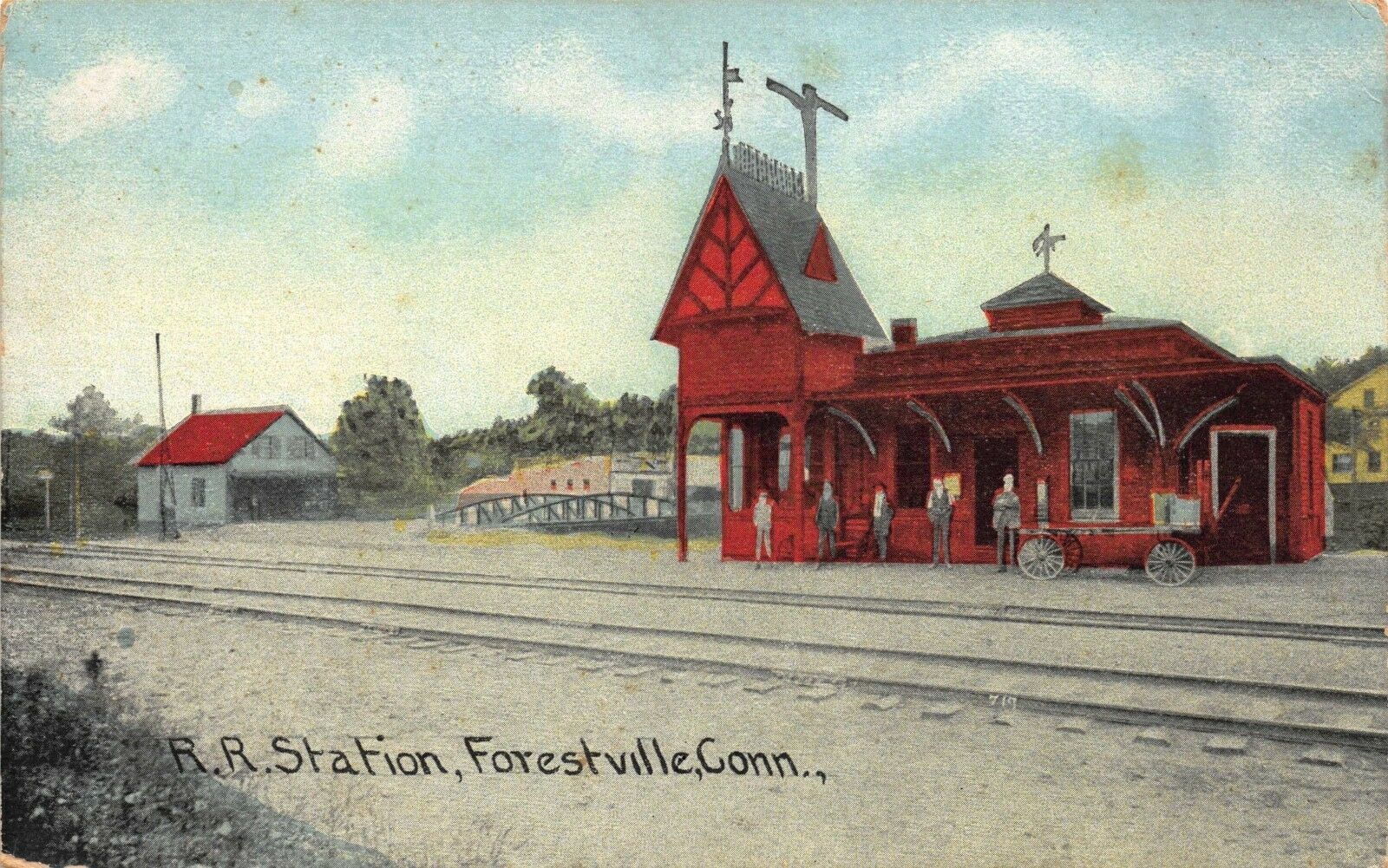
A 1912 postcard of the station

Forestville station is located in the heart of Forestville village, on the west side of Central Street, between the former railroad right-of-way it served and the Pequabuck River. It is a small single-story wood frame structure, with a bracketed cornice and a hipped roof topped by a louvered cupola with finial. A platform shelter extends east from the station, supported by square posts with angle brackets. The building originally had a two-story tower, which was lost to fire in 1900. Its footprint is now occupied by a slightly projecting section that historically acted as a vestibule.

The station was built in 1881 by the New York and New England Railroad on a railroad line originally owned by the Hartford, Providence and Fishkill Railroad. Local lore says that the building was prefabricated and delivered to the site by the railroad. If this method was used, it was the only instance in which the railroad employed this construction method. The station was served at the outset by 13 trains per day, greatly enhancing the village's economic prosperity. Service to the station was discontinued in 1960.

== See also ==
- National Register of Historic Places listings in Hartford County, Connecticut
