= Southbridge station =

- New York, New Haven & Hartford Passenger Depot
- U.S. National Register of Historic Places
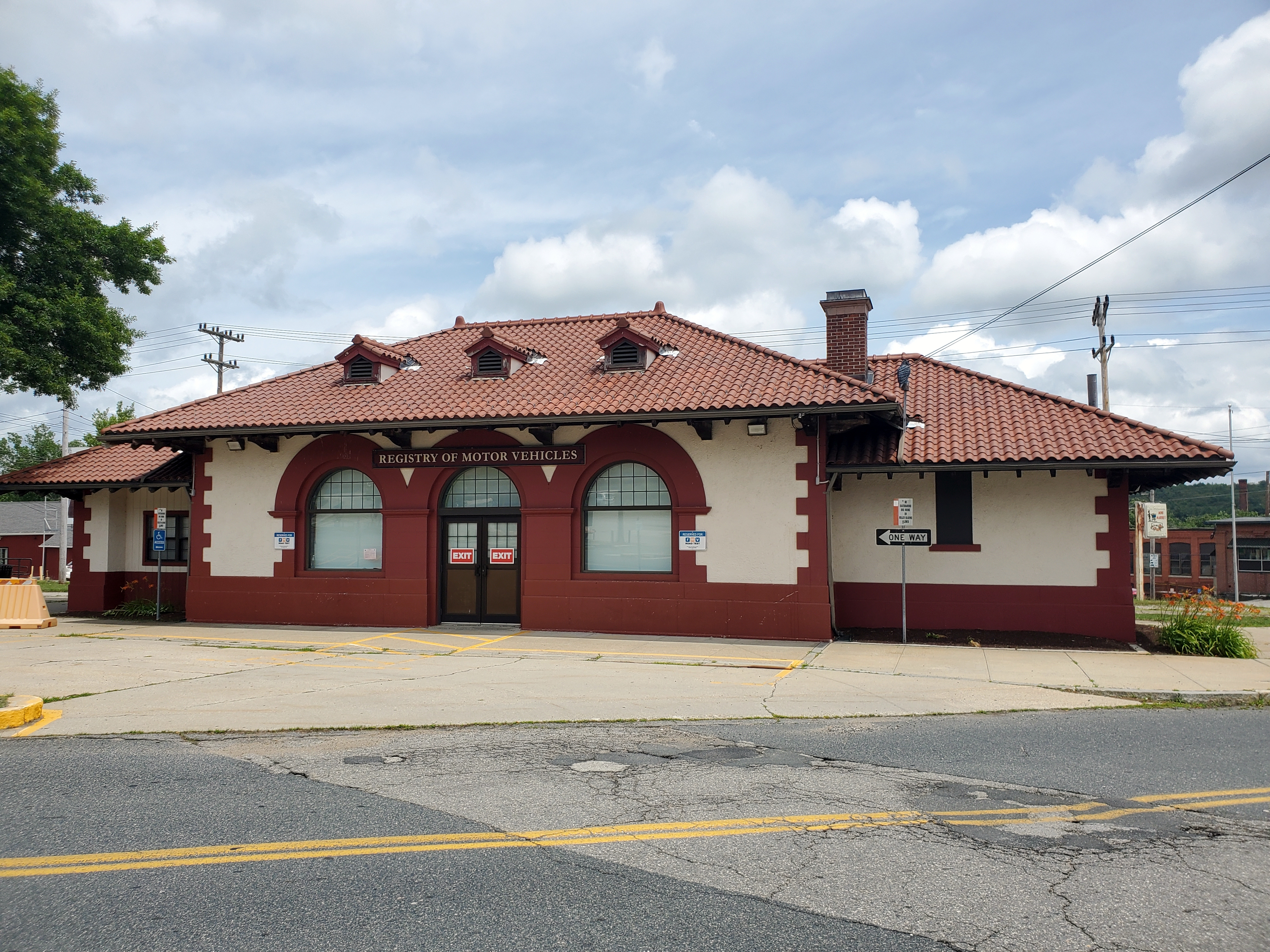
- The former station building in June 2021

- Location within Massachusetts Location within the United States
- Location: Larochelle Way, Southbridge, Massachusetts
- Coordinates: 42°4′37″N 72°2′0″W
- Built: 1910
- Architectural style: Spanish Villa
- MPS: Southbridge MRA
- NRHP reference No.: 89000554
- Added to NRHP: June 22, 1989

Southbridge station is a former train station in Southbridge, Massachusetts. Built in 1910 by the New York, New Haven and Hartford Railroad (NYNH&H), it is a rare local example of Spanish Mediterranean architecture, and is the only surviving railroad building in the town. The building was listed on the National Register of Historic Places in 1989 as New York, New Haven & Hartford Passenger Depot. It presently serves as the town's registry for motor vehicles.

== Description and history ==
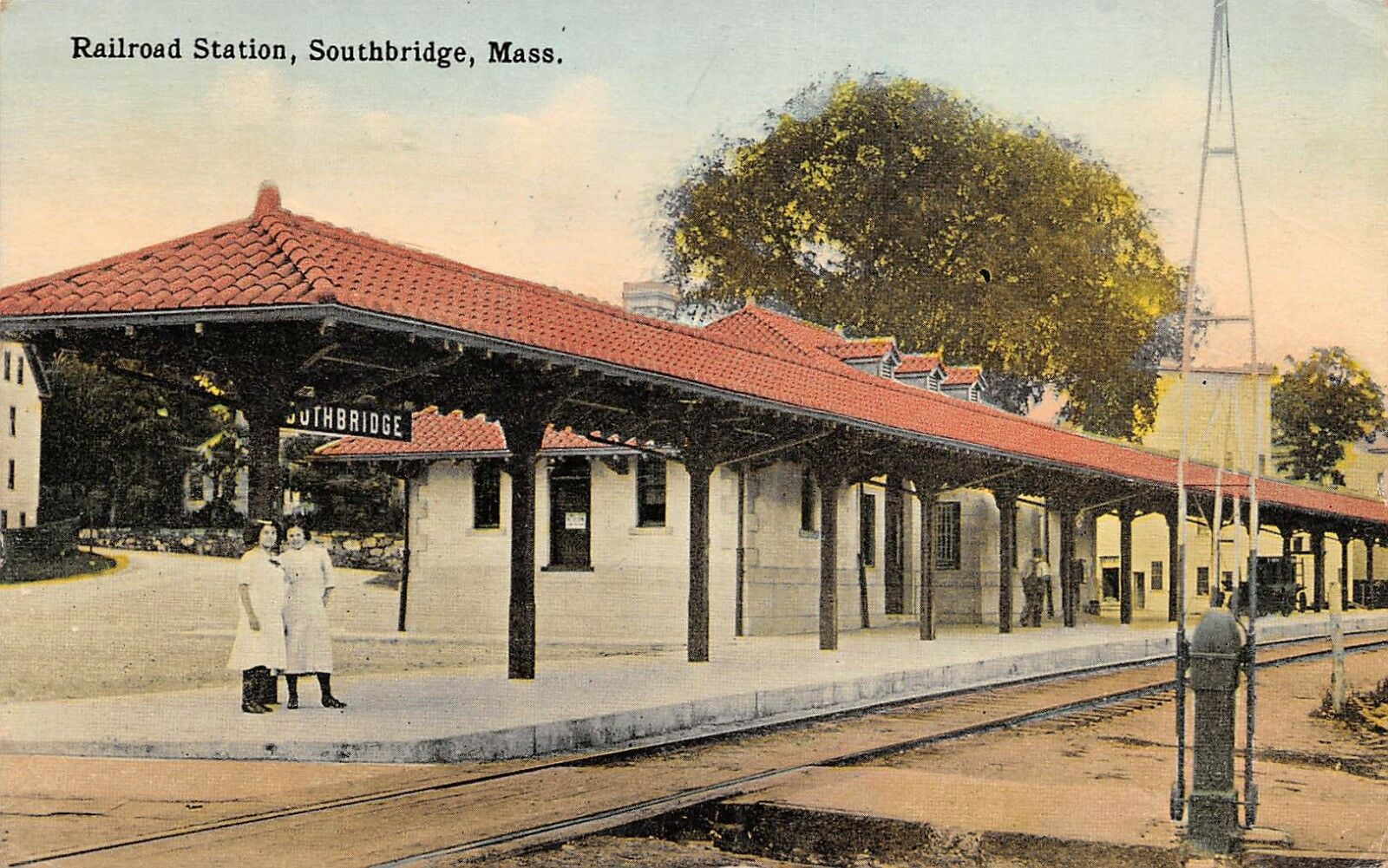
Early-20th-century postcard of the station

The former station is located on a roughly triangular parcel between Southbridge’s downtown and the Quinebaug River, where much of its industry was historically located. The parcel is bounded on the northeast by the former railroad tracks, the south by Larochelle Way (formerly Depot Street), and on the north and west by Hook Street. It is a single story wood frame structure, built in a Spanish Colonial style, with stucco walls and tile roof. A similarly-roofed passenger waiting area once lined the south side of the track on the platform just north of the station, but this has been removed.

Southbridge's railroad service began in 1866, with service provided by the Blackstone and Southbridge Railroad. The track originally extended further to the northwest, nearer the Hamilton Woolen Company mill complex, where there once stood passenger and freight depots and an office building. After a series of mergers, the service was taken over by the New York, New Haven and Hartford Railroad in 1907. This depot was built by that railroad in 1910, and served as a passenger station until 1930. Its style, which is uncommon in any sort of building in central Massachusetts, was somewhat typical for railroad-related infrastructure during the early 20th century.

== See also ==
- National Register of Historic Places listings in Southbridge, Massachusetts
- National Register of Historic Places listings in Worcester County, Massachusetts
