= List of Central Vermont Railway stations =

Central Vermont Railway stations and depots are any of the buildings that have historically served as train stations of the Central Vermont Railway, including:

- Amherst station (Massachusetts)
- Bellows Falls station
- Union Station (Brattleboro, Vermont)
- Essex Junction station
- Montpelier station (Vermont)
- New London Union Station
- Central Vermont Railway Depot (Northfield, Vermont)
- Union Station (Palmer, Massachusetts)
- Randolph station (Vermont)
- St. Albans station (Vermont)
- South Royalton Railroad Station
- Waterbury station (Vermont)
- White River Junction station
- Windsor station (Vermont)
