= Claremont station (New Hampshire) =

Railway station in New Hampshire, United States

Claremont, NH
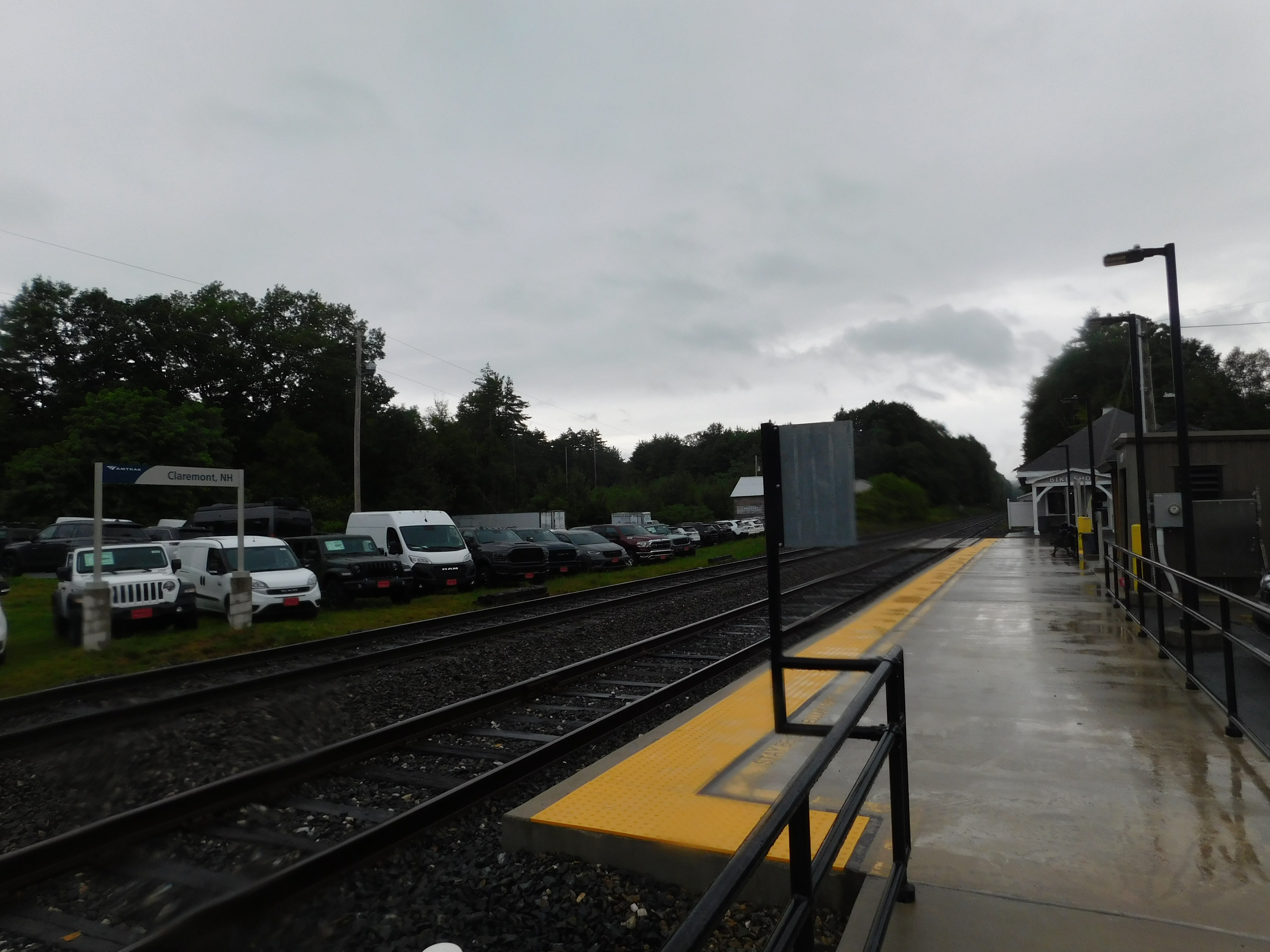
- Claremont station in August 2023

General information
- Location: 12 Plains Road; Claremont, New Hampshire; United States
- Coordinates: 43°22′09″N 72°22′40″W
- Owner: John C. Lambert 2012 Revoc Trust
- Line: New England Central Railroad
- Platforms: 1 side platform
- Tracks: 2

Construction
- Parking: Yes
- Cycle facilities: Yes; Bicycle shop
- Accessible: Yes

Other information
- Station code: Amtrak: CLA

History
- Opened: 1920

Passengers
- FY 2025: 3,308 (Amtrak)

Services
Preceding station	Amtrak	Following station
Bellows Falls toward Washington, D.C.	Vermonter	Windsor toward St. Albans
Former services
Preceding station	Central Vermont Railway	Following station
Charlestown toward New London	Main Line	Windsor toward St. Johns
Location

Claremont station is a train station in Claremont, New Hampshire served by Amtrak, the U.S. national railroad passenger system. The station was originally opened in 1920 by the Boston and Maine Railroad as Claremont Junction. Claremont is the only Amtrak station in western New Hampshire and is presently served by Amtrak's daily Vermonter service.
