= Vermonter (Central Vermont train) =

Vermonter (CV train)
Overview
- Service type: Inter-city rail
- Status: Discontinued
- Locale: Northeastern United States
- First service: 1940
- Last service: 1965
- Successor: Vermonter
- Former operator: Central Vermont Railway

Route
- Termini: St. Albans; White River Junction
- Distance travelled: 118 miles
- Service frequency: daily
- Train numbers: 303 & 304

On-board services
- Seating arrangements: Coach seating
- Sleeping arrangements: Pullman

Technical
- Track gauge: 4 ft 8 1/2 in (1,435 mm)

The Vermonter was a Central Vermont Railway local sleeper train that ran between St. Albans and White River Junction. Passengers could connect to and from the Montrealer in White River Junction.

== History ==
The Vermonter began in 1940. It left St. Albans at 9:20 PM and arrived at White River Junction at 1:10 AM, making 14 additional stops compared to the Washingtonian. It provided a faster trip for passengers on the latter train while still providing service to many small, Vermont communities. Its sleeping cars were attached to the Washingtonian in White River Junction as it operated as a local sleeper train. Northbound, it departed White River Junction at 4:14 AM, arriving in St. Albans at 8:15 AM. The Vermonter was the only named-train CV operated exclusively on its own tracks.

The last run occurred on November 5, 1965 as the mail it carried was switched to trucks. This train lends its name to the modern incarnation of the Vermonter.
