= Montpelier station (Vermont) =

Train station in Vermont, United States

Montpelier, VT
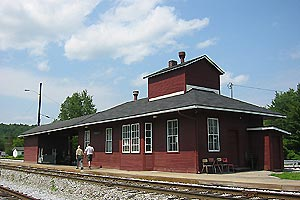
- Montpelier–Berlin station in July 2006

General information
- Location: 297 Junction Road; Berlin, Vermont; United States
- Coordinates: 44.25568°N 72.60640°W
- Line: New England Central Railroad
- Platforms: 1 side platform
- Tracks: 1

Other information
- Station code: Amtrak: MPR

History
- Rebuilt: 1934

Passengers
- FY 2025: 8,035 (Amtrak)

Services
Preceding station	Amtrak	Following station
Randolph toward Washington, D.C.	Vermonter	Waterbury toward St. Albans
Former services
Preceding station	Amtrak	Following station
White River Junction toward Washington, D.C.	Montrealer	Waterbury toward Montreal
Preceding station	Central Vermont Railway	Following station
Riverton toward New London	Main Line	Middlesex toward St. Johns
Terminus	Barre Subdivision	Montpelier toward Barre
Location

Montpelier station, also known as Montpelier–Berlin station, Montpelier Junction, and formerly Montpelier–Barre is a railroad station in Berlin, Vermont, United States. It is served by Amtrak's Vermonter line and provides service to the nearby cities of Montpelier and Barre.

A railroad station has stood at this site since the mid-19th century. Originally a freight stop for wood, the Vermont Central Railroad (VCR) established a junction station for passengers known as Montpelier Junction in 1849. That year, VCR built a branch line to downtown Montpelier, providing service to Vermont's capital. The current station was built in 1934 by the Central Vermont Railway, VCR's successor. It is likely the third station building on the site.

Regular service on the Montpelier branch was discontinued in 1938 and replaced with a bus line. Service to Montpelier Junction ended altogether in 1966. In 1972, Amtrak restored service to the station on the Montrealer line, which was later replaced by the Vermonter when service to Montreal ended.
