= Bellows Falls station =

Railroad station in Bellows Falls, Vermont, US

Bellows Falls, VT
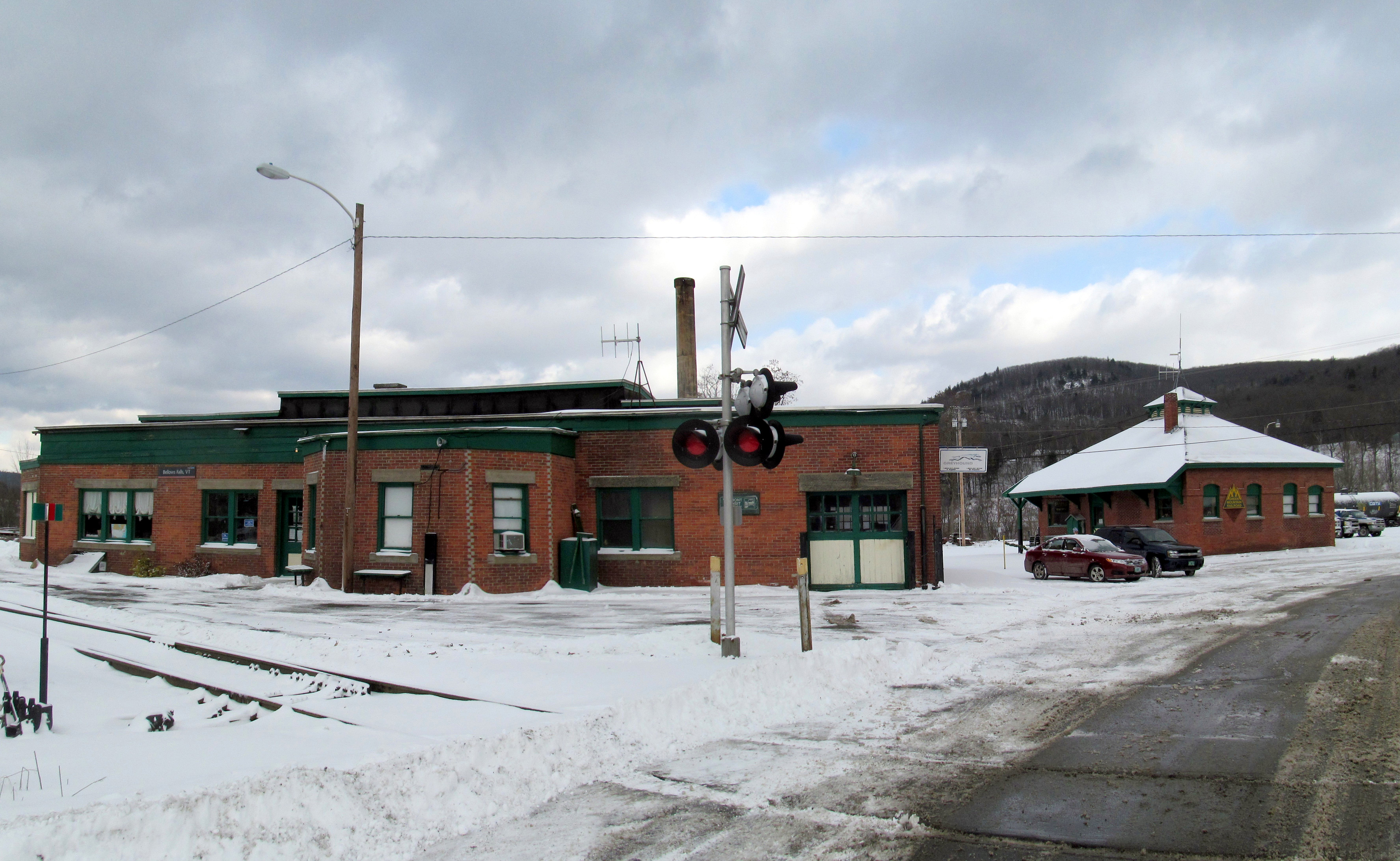
- The station (left) and the former Railway Express Agency building in 2015

General information
- Location: 54 Depot Street; Bellows Falls, Vermont; United States
- Coordinates: 43.136407°N 72.444657°W
- Owner: Green Mountain Railroad
- Lines: New England Central Railroad; Green Mountain Railroad
- Platforms: 1 side platform
- Tracks: 1
- Connections: The Current: 2, 53, 55, 57; Greyhound Lines

Other information
- Station code: Amtrak: BLF

History
- Opened: January 1, 1849; September 30, 1972; July 18, 1989
- Closed: September 6, 1966; April 6, 1987
- Rebuilt: 1851; 1922–1923

Passengers
- FY 2025: 5,388 (Amtrak)

Services
Preceding station	Amtrak	Following station
Brattleboro toward Washington, D.C.	Vermonter	Claremont toward St. Albans
Former services
Preceding station	Amtrak	Following station
Brattleboro toward Washington, D.C.	Montrealer 1972–1987, 1989–1995	White River Junction toward Montreal
Preceding station	Central Vermont Railway	Following station
Brattleboro toward New London	Main Line	Charlestown toward St. Johns
Preceding station	Rutland Railroad	Following station
Rockingham toward Rouses Point	Rouses Point–Bellows Falls	Terminus
Chester toward Montreal	Green Mountain Flyer / Mount Royal	through to Boston via Boston and Maine Railroad
Preceding station	Boston and Maine Railroad	Following station
Terminus	Cheshire Branch	Walpole toward Winchendon
through to Montreal via Rutland Railroad	Green Mountain Flyer / Mount Royal	Keene toward Boston
Location

Bellows Falls station is an Amtrak intercity rail station located in the Bellows Falls village of Rockingham, Vermont, United States. The station is served by the single daily round trip of the Washington, D.C.–St. Albans Vermonter. It has a single side platform adjacent to the single track of the New England Central Railroad (ex-Central Vermont) mainline.

Three railroads—the Sullivan County Railroad, Cheshire Railroad, and Rutland and Burlington Railroad—were completed to Bellows Falls in 1849, followed by the Vermont Valley Railroad in 1851. This placed Bellows Falls at the junction of two major trunk lines: Boston–Burlington via Rutland and Fitchburg, and New York–Montreal via New Haven and White River Junction. A two-story brick station was constructed in 1851 at the junction of the four railroads. After a number of mergers and leases over the next half-century, service was consolidated into three major railroads by 1900. The Boston and Maine Railroad (B&M) and Central Vermont (CV) ran north–south service through Bellows Falls, while the B&M and Rutland Railroad collaborated on east–west traffic on the Boston–Montreal route via Bellows Falls.

Much of the downtown area, including the train station, was destroyed in a 1921 fire; it was replaced in 1922–23 with a one-story brick building on the same site. Passenger service declined over the following decades, with all passenger service to Bellows Falls ended in 1966. In 1972, newly created Amtrak restored the Washington, D.C.–Montreal Montrealer. Bellows Falls was served by the Montrealer from 1972 to 1987, and 1989 to 1995; since 1995 it has been served by the Vermonter.

The station building and a circa-1880 Railway Express Agency (REA) building nearby were added to the National Register of Historic Places in 1982 as part of the Bellows Falls Downtown Historic District. The former REA building houses the offices of the Green Mountain Railroad.

== History ==
=== Initial railroads ===
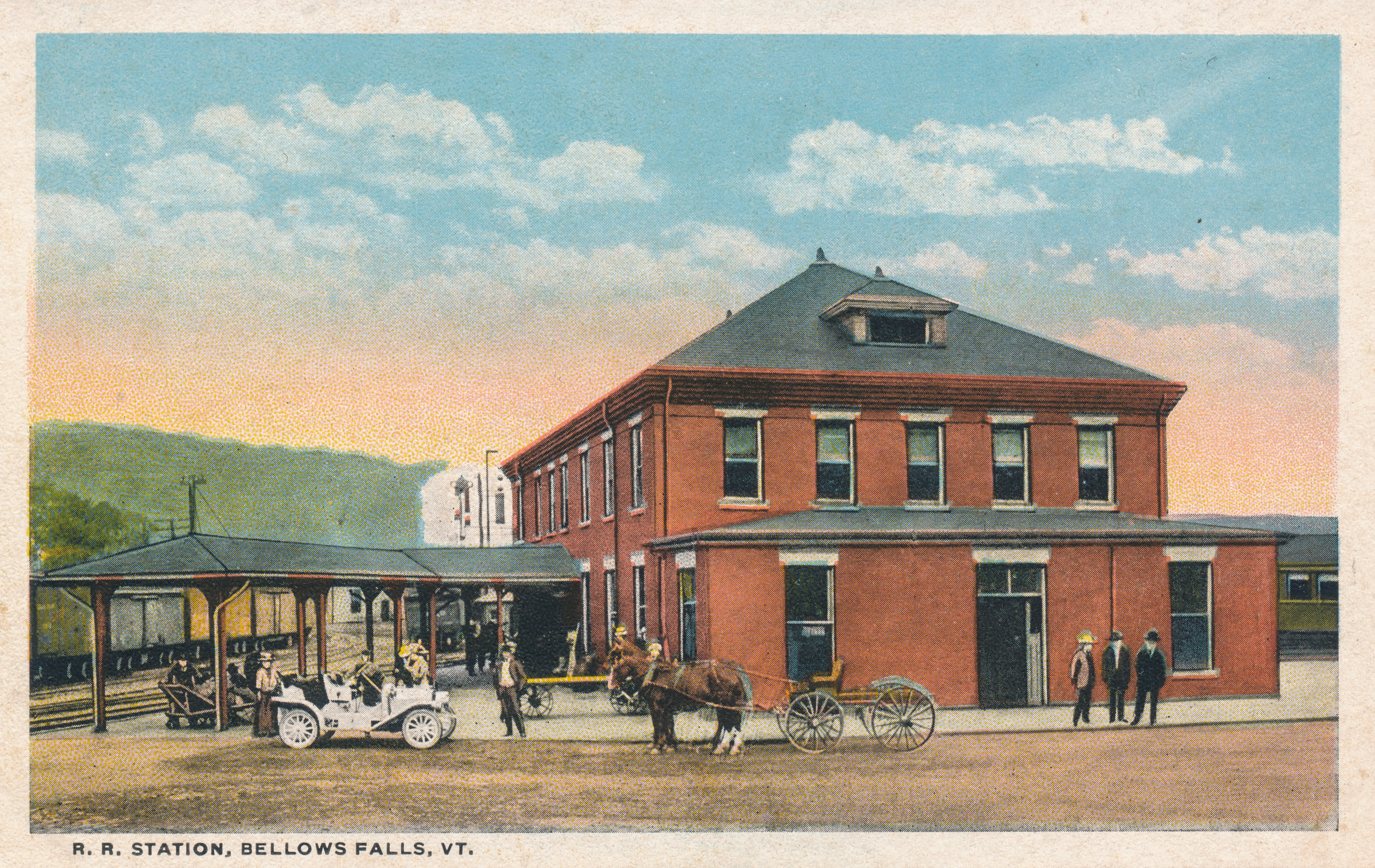
The 1852-built Bellows Falls station, circa 1915

The village of Bellows Falls was a transportation hub even before railroads: the 1785 construction of a bridge across the Connecticut River made it a stop for stagecoach lines, and the 1802 completion of the Bellows Falls Canal provided industrial power and a safe water route bypassing the nearby falls. In 1849, three railroads met at Bellows Falls. The Sullivan County Railroad opened from Bellows Falls to Charlestown, New Hampshire on January 1, 1849, and to Windsor, Vermont the next month, where it connected to the Vermont Central Railroad. Around the same time, the Cheshire Railroad completed its line from South Ashburnham, Massachusetts (where it met the Vermont and Massachusetts Railroad) to the New Hampshire side of Bellows Falls; the bridge across the Connecticut River was completed that June. The Rutland and Burlington Railroad was completed from Bellows Falls to its namesake towns on December 18, 1849; it met the previous two railroads at the north end of the island formed by the canal.

The Vermont Valley Railroad opened from Bellows Falls (including a tunnel under the town square) to Brattleboro, Vermont in 1851. This placed Bellows Falls at the junction of two major trunk lines: Boston–Burlington via Rutland and Fitchburg, and New York–Montreal via New Haven and White River Junction. Boston–Montreal traffic also passed through Bellows Falls until around 1853, when the Vermont Central began using the Northern Railroad as its main Boston connection. The railroads constructed a two-story brick station in the southeast corner of the railroad junction on the island. The island also housed freight houses, a roundhouse, and other railroad structures. A one-story brick Railway Express Agency (REA) building with a cupola on its roof was built next to the station between 1878 and 1885.

=== Mergers ===
A series of acquisitions and leases resulted placed the Sullivan County Railroad, Vermont Valley Railroad, and Rutland Railroad (successor to the Rutland and Burlington) under the control of the Vermont Central by the end of 1870. These moves left the Vermont Central deep in debt; it was reorganized as the Central Vermont Railroad (CV) in 1873. By 1880, still struggling, the CV leased the Sullivan County and Vermont Valley to the Connecticut River Railroad (with the CV retaining trackage rights); the CV itself would be leased by the Boston and Maine Railroad (B&M) in 1893. The Cheshire Railroad was acquired in 1890 by the Fitchburg Railroad, which was in turn leased by the B&M in 1900. The CV canceled its lease of the Rutland Railroad in 1896. The B&M and CV ran north–south service through Bellows Falls, while the B&M and Rutland collaborated on east–west traffic on the Boston–Montreal route via Bellows Falls. The station building was renovated in 1891.

=== The second station ===
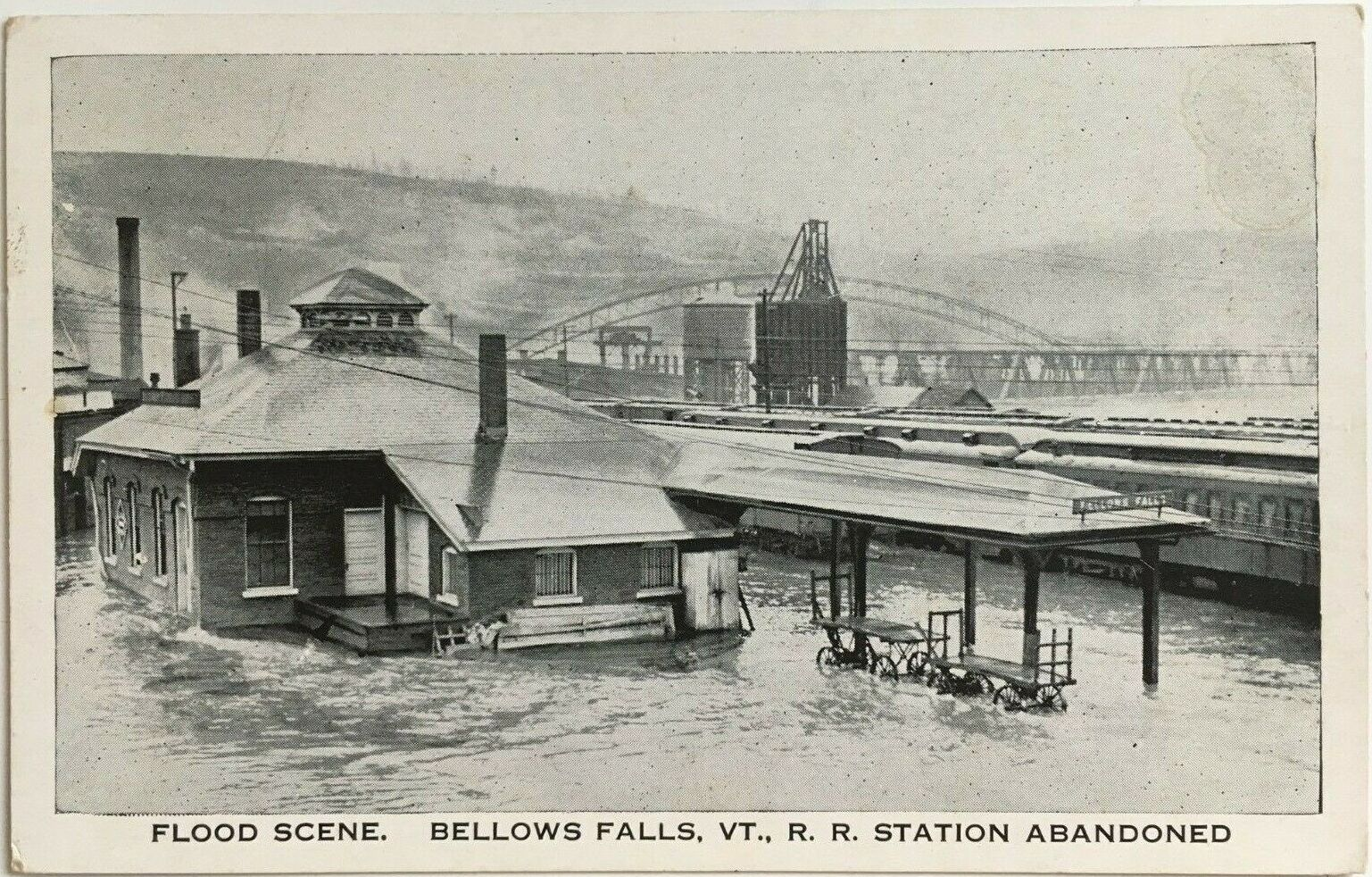
The REA office during the 1927 floods

On December 21, 1921, much of the station was destroyed by a fire that began in the station's kitchen. It was replaced in 1922-23 with a one-story brick building on the same site. Construction was handled by H. Wales Lines of Meriden, Connecticut. The rectangular building has three polygonal pavilions - one each on the sides facing the tracks, and a larger seven-sided one facing the junction - to provide additional interior space. The larger pavilion, with its panoramic view of the Connecticut River, housed a newsstand and restaurant; the pavilion facing the CV/B&M line houses the agent's office. A canopy wrapped around the station building and onto the REA building. The new building opened on March 10, 1923. (Note: Great American Stations and the National Register for Historical Places nomination form wrongly date the fire and station opening to 1922.) The Great Vermont Flood of 1927 left the station under 4 feet (1.2 m) of water.

All passenger service on the Rutland Railroad - including the Boston sections of the Green Mountain Flyer and Mount Royal via Bellows Falls - ended on June 26, 1953. (Freight service on the Rutland Railroad ceased in 1961; three years later, the Green Mountain Railroad took over the Rutland–Bellows Falls line.) The B&M discontinued passenger service on the Cheshire on May 18, 1958 - part of massive service cuts that day. Passenger service to Bellows Falls ended on September 6, 1966, when the Montrealer was cut. The canopy was soon removed.

=== Amtrak era ===
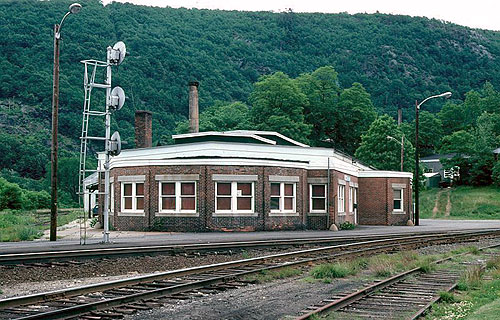
Bellows Falls station in 1978

Amtrak took over intercity passenger rail service in the United States on May 1, 1971. Vermont was not initially served by Amtrak, as initial routes were limited to a "basic system" primarily consisting of intercity routes still in operation at that time. 1972 legislation to add international service resulted in the restoration of the Montrealer on September 29, 1972, restoring rail service through Vermont. The waiting room was reopened for Amtrak passengers, but services like ticketing were not provided; the B&M used the baggage room for storage. After the REA ceased operations in the 1970s, the Green Mountain Railroad began using the REA office as its freight office; it also maintains the station building.

The Bellows Falls Downtown Historic District was added to the National Register of Historic Places on August 16, 1982. It included three railroad structures as contributing properties: the station building, the REA office, and a circa-1860 Cheshire Railroad freight house (which was later demolished around 2000). In 1984, the Green Mountain Railroad began operating excursion service from Bellows Falls.

The Montrealer was suspended north of Springfield, Massachusetts, on April 6, 1987, because of deteriorating track conditions on the B&M-owned section of the CV mainline between Brattleboro and Windsor, Vermont, as well as the Connecticut River Line in Massachusetts. After National Railroad Passenger Corp. v. Boston & Maine Corp. upheld Amtrak's right to seize the Vermont section and resell it to the CV, the Montrealer resumed service on July 18, 1989. On April 2, 1995, the overnight Montrealer was replaced with the daytime Vermonter, with its northbound terminus truncated to St. Albans. The station has been served by the single daily round trip of the Vermonter since then.

The station was used as a filming location for the 1999 movie The Cider House Rules. Writer John Irving commented that "Indeed, the Bellows Falls train station and its attendant buildings showed all the usual signs of neglect; it required only some period automobiles, and of course the steam engine and vintage passenger cars, to look like St. Cloud's, Maine, in the 1940s."

=== Town purchase ===
In January 2020, the town of Rockingham considered purchasing the poorly maintained station building from the Green Mountain Railroad for $120,000. This was soon scaled back to a $12,000 evaluation. In March 2020, the town applied for an equally sized federal grant for the evaluation. In December 2021, the village Board of Trustees endorsed an application for a federal grant to cover $100,000 of the $250,000 purchase price. In March 2022, town voters approved spending $75,000 to purchase the station.

In April 2022, the town select board approved an application for a $1.8 million federal earmark to partially fund a $4 million renovation, then planned for 2024–25. An accessible platform will be constructed as part of the settlement of a national lawsuit against Amtrak. Town plans to reconstruct the original platform canopies were rejected by the New England Central because they would block visibility of a signal. The town won a $200,000 state grant, to be used along with the $75,000 to purchase the station, in June 2022. The town paid a $10,000 purchase option for the station in January 2024, with the full purchase expected to take place that June and construction beginning in July. $115,000 of federal relief funds was formally allocated to the purchase in February 2024.

The Vermont Agency of Transportation obtained a $1 million federal earmark for the platform project in March 2024. By May 2024, the platform project had been delayed to 2025 due to slow progress in purchasing the station. If the purchase was not competed by September 30, 2024, the price would increase to $285,000. In July 2024, testing found that vapors from nearby contaminated soil were leaking into the basement of the station building. That year, voters approved a five-year, $150,000 loan for the purchase. In January 2025, town officials indicated that $137,500 of additional spending – to be used as matching funds for grants for contamination removal — would be up for vote at a March town meeting.
