= Waterbury station =

Waterbury station may refer to:

- Waterbury station (Metro-North), train station in Connecticut served by the Metro-North Railroad
- Waterbury station (Vermont), train station in Vermont served by Amtrak
- Waterbury Union Station, historic train station in Connecticut now used as newspaper offices
