= Essex Junction station =

Essex Junction, VT
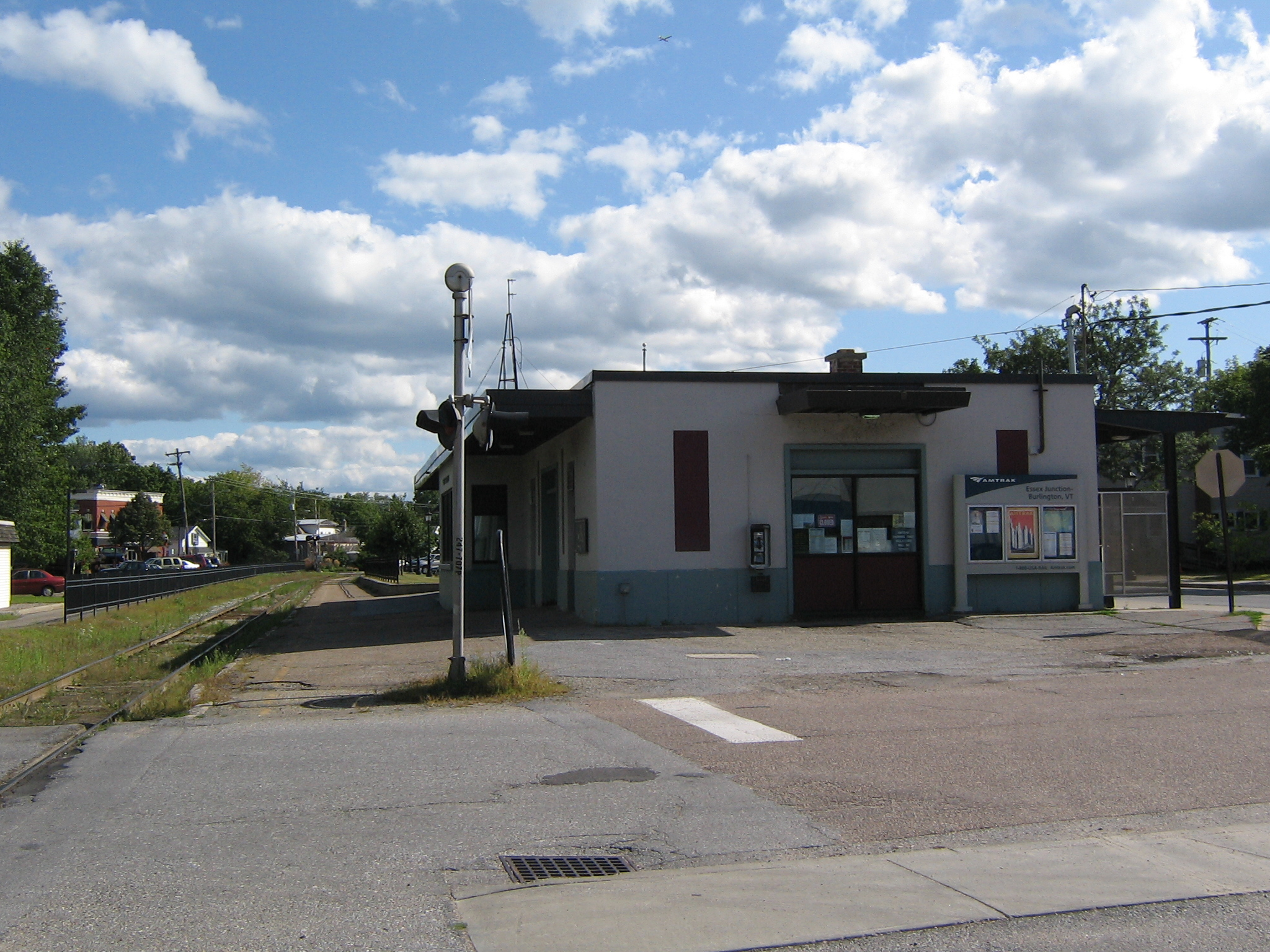

General information
- Location: 29 Railroad Avenue; Essex Junction, Vermont; United States
- Coordinates: 44°29′33″N 73°06′37″W
- Line: New England Central Railroad
- Platforms: 1 side platform
- Tracks: 1
- Connections: Green Mountain Transit (GMT): Route 2 (Essex Junction), Route 4 (Essex Center)

Other information
- Station code: Amtrak: ESX

History
- Opened: 1859
- Rebuilt: October 21, 1958–August 11, 1959

Passengers
- FY 2025: 17,453 (Amtrak)

Services
Preceding station	Amtrak	Following station
Waterbury toward Washington, D.C.	Vermonter	St. Albans Terminus
Former services
Preceding station	Amtrak	Following station
Waterbury toward Washington, D.C.	Montrealer	St. Albans toward Montreal
Preceding station	Central Vermont Railway	Following station
Williston toward New London	Main Line	Colchester toward St. Johns
Fort Ethan Allen toward Burlington	Winooski Subdivision	Terminus
Location

Essex Junction station, also known as Essex Junction–Burlington, is an Amtrak train station in the city of Essex Junction, Vermont, United States. The station was originally built by the Vermont Central Railway in 1859 and replaced in 1959. It serves Amtrak's Vermonter train, which runs from St. Albans, near the Canada–U.S. border, south to Washington, D.C. Prior to bridge trouble at Alburgh, north of St. Albans, train service continued to Montreal. Until the early 1960s, the Boston and Maine railroad operated Montreal to Boston service on The Ambassador through the station.

It became the closest station to Burlington, Vermont's most populous city, when the Rutland Railroad ended service to Burlington on June 26, 1953. Inter-city service directly to Burlington Union Station did not resume until July 29, 2022, when the Ethan Allen Express was extended to Burlington.

The Essex Junction station has received negative attention in recent years, with city officials saying it can make visitors "feel scared or intimidated". Local officials have authorized a $3.5 million face-lift of the station, backed by federal funds, which would prepare the station to accommodate larger passenger numbers if the proposed Vermonter extension to Montreal is built. Platform repairs caused the closure of the waiting room from April 22 to December 3, 2024; a temporary trailer was provided.
