= Swanton Covered Railroad Bridge =

- U.S. National Register of Historic Places
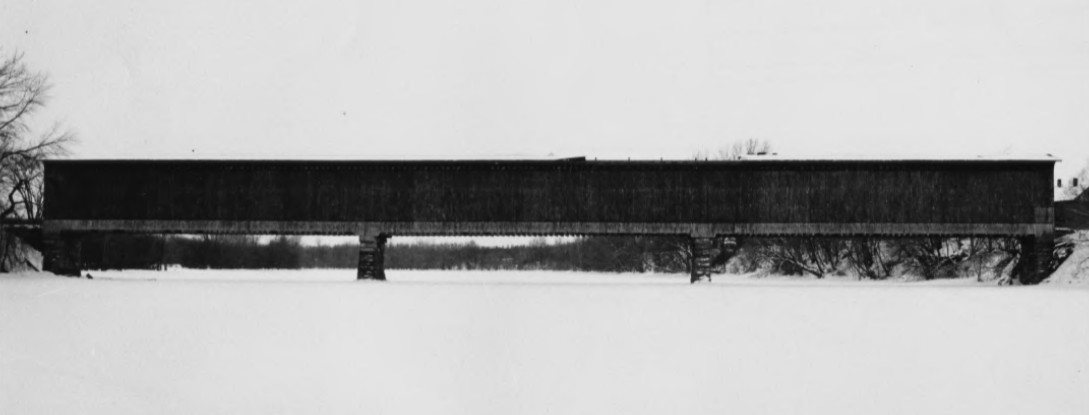
- 1973 photo

- Location within Vermont Location within the United States
- Location: Over the Mississquoi River west of Swanton village, Swanton, Vermont
- Coordinates: 44°56′3″N 73°2′54″W
- Area: less than one acre
- Built: 1898
- Architectural style: Town-Pratt dbl lattice truss
- NRHP reference No.: 73000195
- Added to NRHP: June 18, 1973

The Swanton Covered Railroad Bridge was a covered bridge in Swanton, Vermont. Built in 1898, it carried the St. Johnsbury and Lamoille County Railroad across the Missisquoi River just west of Swanton village. It was destroyed by fire in 1987, and its site is now occupied by the former West Milton Bridge. The bridge was listed on the National Register of Historic Places in 1973, and has not been delisted despite its destruction.

== Description and history ==
The former St. Johnsbury and Lamoille Railroad right of way runs generally easterly from the north-south main line of the Central Vermont Railroad, which runs roughly parallel to the west bank of the north-flowing Missisquoi River west of Swanton village. The covered bridge that stood at this site comprised three spans, with a total length of 369 feet (112 m), set on stone abutments and piers. The bridge was a distinctive combination of Pratt and Town trusses, and had a massive interlaced wooden deck system. Its exterior was finished in vertical board siding.

The bridge was built in 1895. The railroad did not use the bridge after 1967 due to increased train weight, bypassing this section of the line by using the Central Vermont Richford subdivision to bring trains to St. Albans. In 1973 the bridge was listed on the National Register; it had been out of service and was in deteriorating condition. It was destroyed by an arson fire in 1987 The bridge site has since been replaced the trusses of the former West Milton Bridge, and now serves as part of a multi-use trail.

== See also ==
- List of covered bridges in Vermont
- National Register of Historic Places listings in Franklin County, Vermont
- List of bridges on the National Register of Historic Places in Vermont
