= White River Junction station =

Railway station in the United States

White River Junction, VT
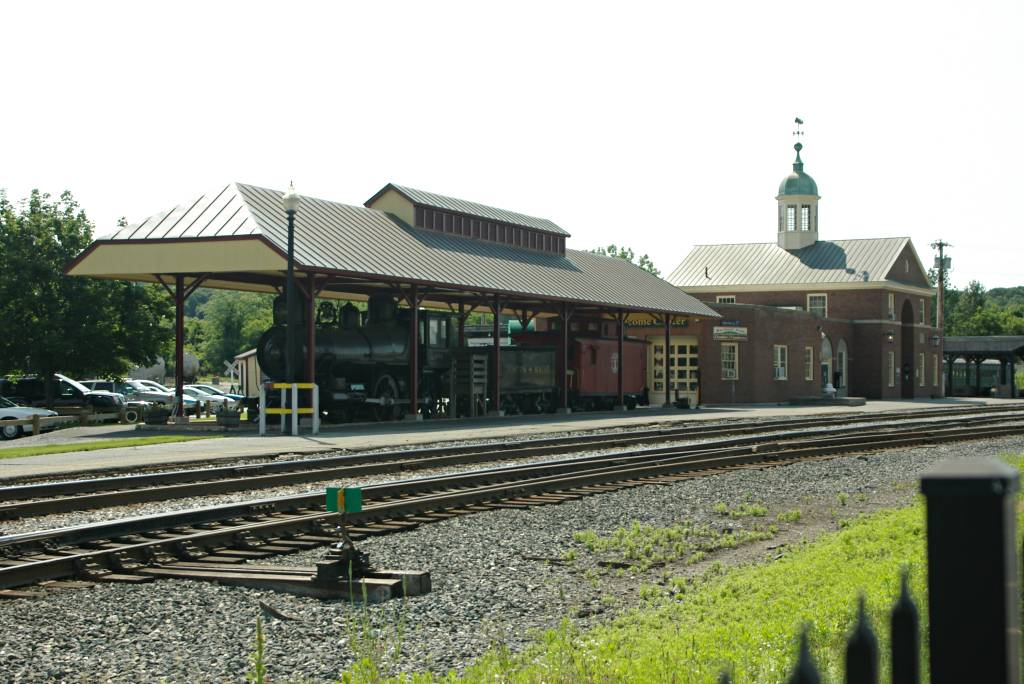

General information
- Location: 102 Railroad Row; White River Junction, Vermont; United States
- Coordinates: 43°38′54″N 72°19′4″W
- Owner: State of Vermont
- Line: New England Central Railroad
- Platforms: 1 side platform
- Tracks: 2
- Connections: Green Mountain Railroad; StageCoach: 89er Advance Transit: Orange Line

Construction
- Accessible: yes

Other information
- Station code: Amtrak: WRJ

History
- Rebuilt: June–December 8, 1937

Passengers
- FY 2025: 16,450 (Amtrak)

Services
Preceding station	Amtrak	Following station
Windsor toward Washington, D.C.	Vermonter	Randolph toward St. Albans
Former services
Preceding station	Amtrak	Following station
Bellows Falls toward Washington, D.C.	Montrealer	Montpelier toward Montreal
Preceding station	Central Vermont Railway	Following station
Evarts toward New London	Main Line	West Hartford toward St. Johns
Location

White River Junction station is a passenger train station in White River Junction, Vermont, served by Amtrak's Vermonter. It is also used by the Green Mountain Railroad for passenger excursion trains to Thetford and the Montshire Museum of Science in Norwich, Vermont. Originally, it was built in 1937 as a union station that served the Boston and Maine Railroad and Central Vermont Railway. On display adjacent to the station is a sheltered display of Boston and Maine Railroad #494, a historic steam locomotive. The station's historic building is a contributing property in the White River Junction Historic District, which is listed on the National Register of Historic Places. Dartmouth College is five miles to the north in Hanover, New Hampshire.

In earlier decades more trains stopped in the station. The Boston & Maine's Ambassador Boston–Montreal train stopped there, as did the Connecticut Yankee in its years as a longer distance international train from New York City to Quebec City.
