= Waterbury station (Vermont) =

American train station

Waterbury, VT
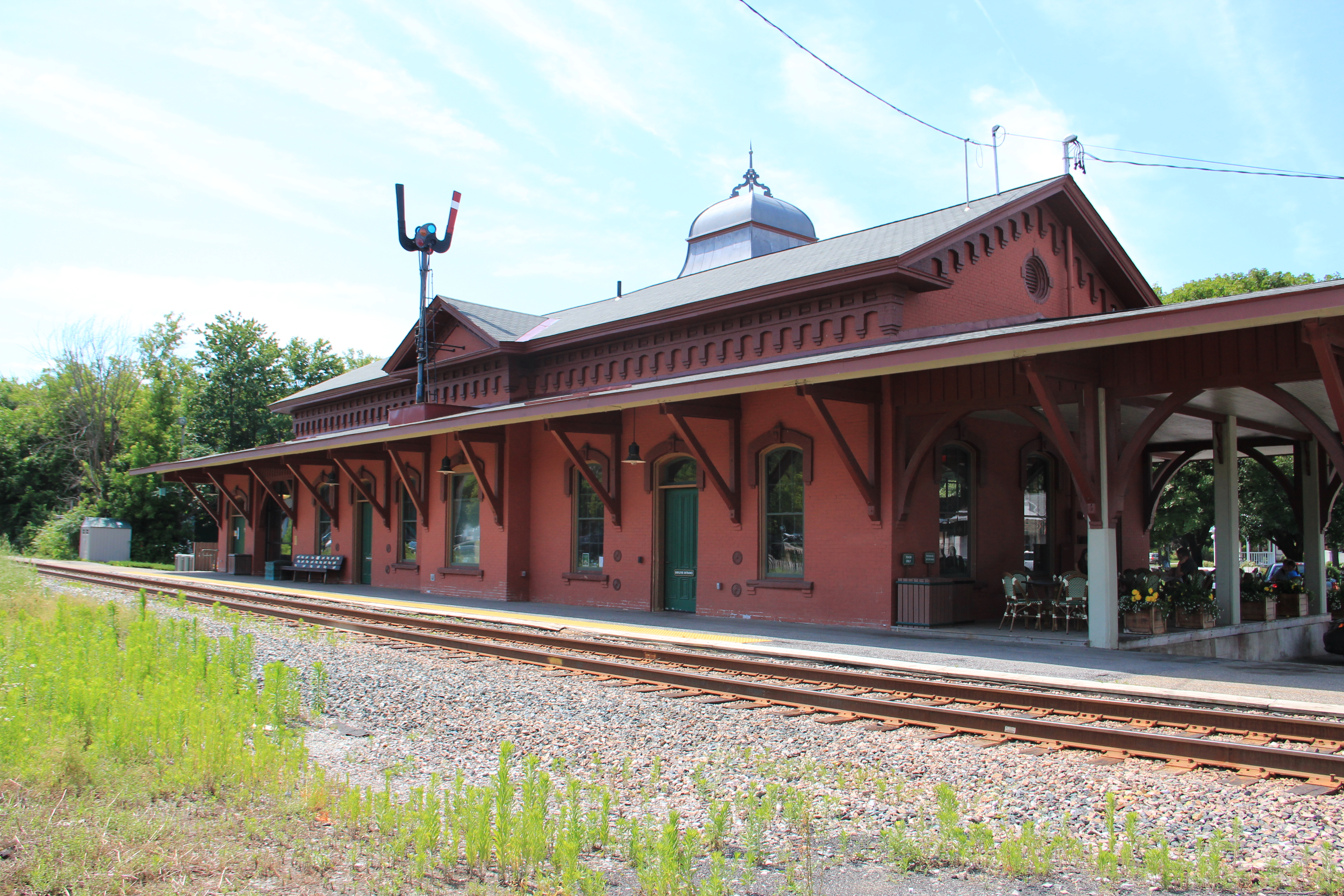

General information
- Location: 1 Rotarian Place; Waterbury, Vermont; United States
- Coordinates: 44°20′06″N 72°45′06″W
- Owner: Revitalizing Waterbury
- Line: New England Central Railroad
- Platforms: 1 side platform
- Tracks: 1
- Connections: Green Mountain Transit: 83, 86, 100

Construction
- Parking: Yes
- Accessible: Yes

Other information
- Station code: Amtrak: WAB

History
- Opened: 1875
- Rebuilt: 2006

Passengers
- FY 2025: 6,273 (Amtrak)

Services
Preceding station	Amtrak	Following station
Montpelier toward Washington, D.C.	Vermonter	Essex Junction toward St. Albans
Former services
Preceding station	Amtrak	Following station
Montpelier toward Washington, D.C.	Montrealer	Essex Junction toward Montreal
Preceding station	Central Vermont Railway	Following station
Middlesex toward New London	Main Line	Bolton toward St. Johns
Preceding station	Mount Mansfield Electric Railroad	Following station
Terminus	Waterbury - Stowe (1897-1932)	Stowe Terminus
Location

Waterbury station, also known as Waterbury–Stowe, is an Amtrak train station in Waterbury, Vermont, United States. It was originally built in 1875 by the Central Vermont Railroad.

During 2006, the station underwent a major renovation project, during which the building was restored to its 1875 appearance. Corrective structural work was done on the trackside wall and canopy and water drainage problems were addressed. Workers also rebuilt the bell-shaped cupola on the top of the central tower. Inside, partitions were removed to expose the original 18-foot-high vaulted ceiling. Green Mountain Coffee now leases most of the space in the depot.
