= Mount Mansfield Electric Railroad =

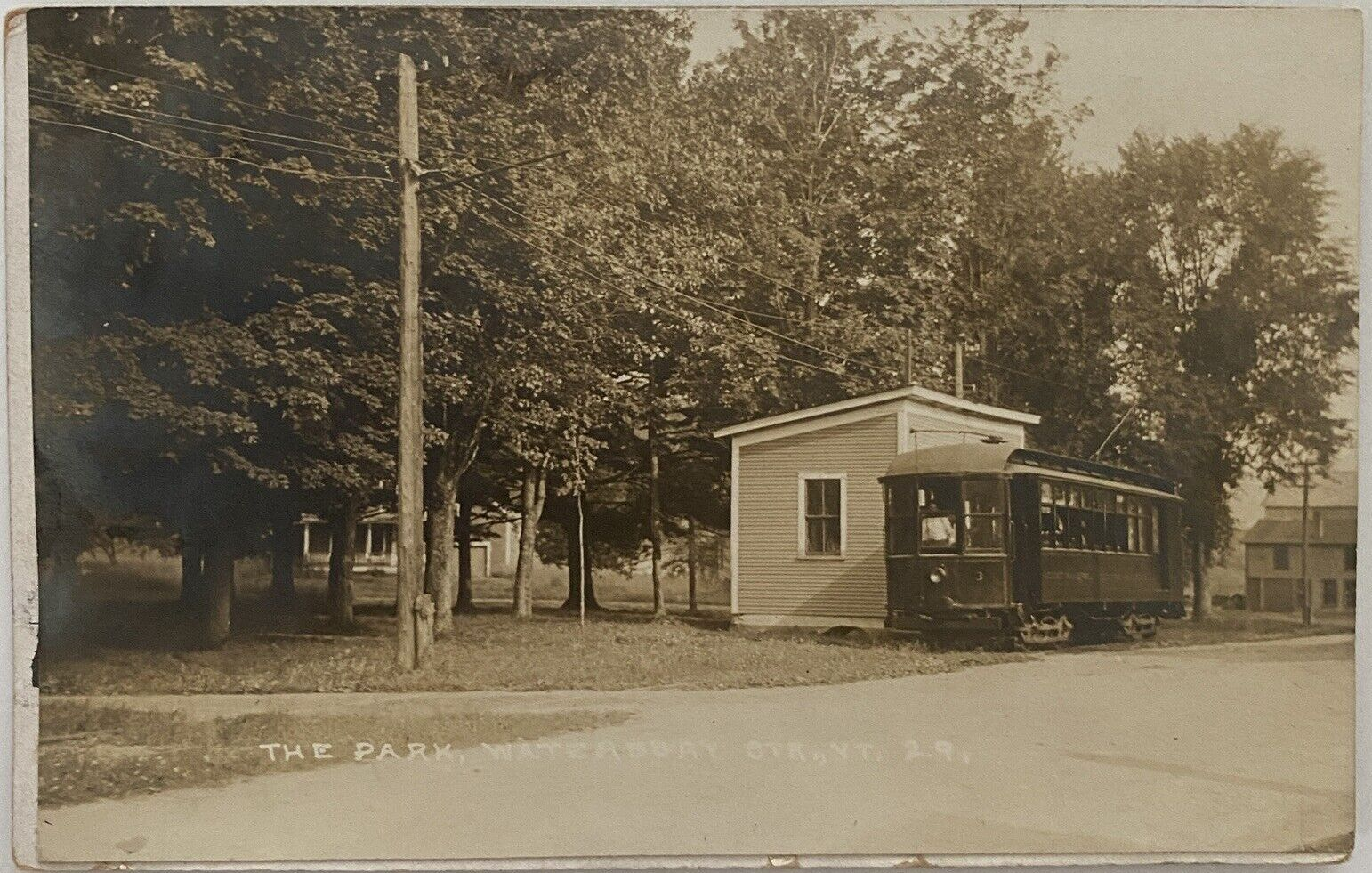
Postcard view of a streetcar at Waterbury Center

The Mount Mansfield Electric Railroad was an intrastate railroad in central Vermont. It ran from Waterbury to Stowe, a distance of approximately 12 miles (19 km).

== History ==
An electric railroad between Stowe and Waterbury, connecting with the Central Vermont Railway, was authorized by the legislature of Vermont in 1865, 1872, 1888, and 1894. Not until 1897 were sufficient funds raised and construction started. A power plant was built at the south end of Stowe, outside of the village, along with a battery house just north of Colbyville, and service began in 1898. The line operated three passenger cars with baggage areas, two freight motors, a single truck work car which was basically an open-air trolley, and a doubled-ended rotary snowplow. This last saw minimal service, as the unit damaged the track and neighboring structures, and was not effective at the Waterbury end of the railroad due to low current. A wreck shortly after the commencement of services damaged one of the passenger cars; it was removed from service almost immediately.

Traffic on the line was never heavy, with the primary shipper being the Burt Lumber Company in Stowe, which shipped clapboards and other wood products to the Boston area. Damage from the 1927 hurricane-related flooding was minimal, but traffic declined further in the early 1930s, and the right-of-way was passed to the state of Vermont in 1932, which promptly turned much of the roadbed into the first concrete paved road in the state, Vermont Route 100.

The corporate structure of the MMER remained until 1963, operating trucks which carried goods over the new concrete road from Stowe to the train freight station at Waterbury.

== Stations ==
An 1897 timetable listed the following stops from south to north:

- Waterbury, Vermont
- Stowe, Vermont

The Stowe terminus had a covered station in the back of a storefront. That building still stands on the south side of the main street in the village, but has been extensively renovated. Small stations were built at the side road leading to Moscow, Vermont, and in Waterbury Center. There was no station at the Waterbury end of the line; passengers used the Central Vermont Railway's Waterbury station (still in existence), and freight was carried to the freight depot. There was an interchange, and boxcars and loads of coal made their way over the entire line by use of the freight motors.
