= Central Vermont Railroad Headquarters =

- U.S. National Register of Historic Places
- U.S. Historic district
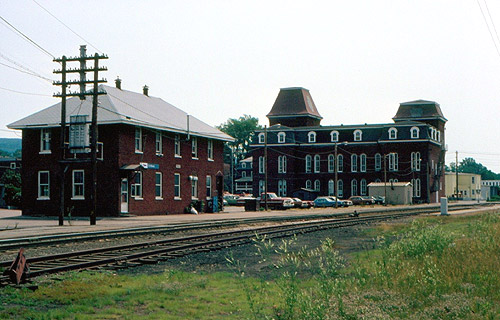
- The present Amtrak station (left) and CVR office building (right)

- Location within Vermont Location within the United States
- Location: Bounded roughly by Federal, Catherine, Allen, Lower Welden, Houghton, and Pine Sts., St. Albans
- Coordinates: 44°48′41″N 73°5′15″W
- Area: 51 acres (21 ha)
- Built: 1863
- Built by: Central Vermont Railroad
- NRHP reference No.: 74000211
- Added to NRHP: January 21, 1974

The Central Vermont Railroad Headquarters is a complex of railroad-related buildings and infrastructure in the city of St. Albans, Vermont. Developed between the 1860s and 1920s by the Central Vermont Railroad (CVR), the complex is the largest assemblage of railroad-related buildings in Vermont. Located between Catherine and Pine Streets on either side of Lake Street, it was listed on the National Register of Historic Places in 1974. Many of the buildings are no longer used for railroad functions, but the former Central Vermont Railway Office now houses the offices of the New England Central Railroad, and the present Amtrak station uses a former CVR building.

== Description and history ==
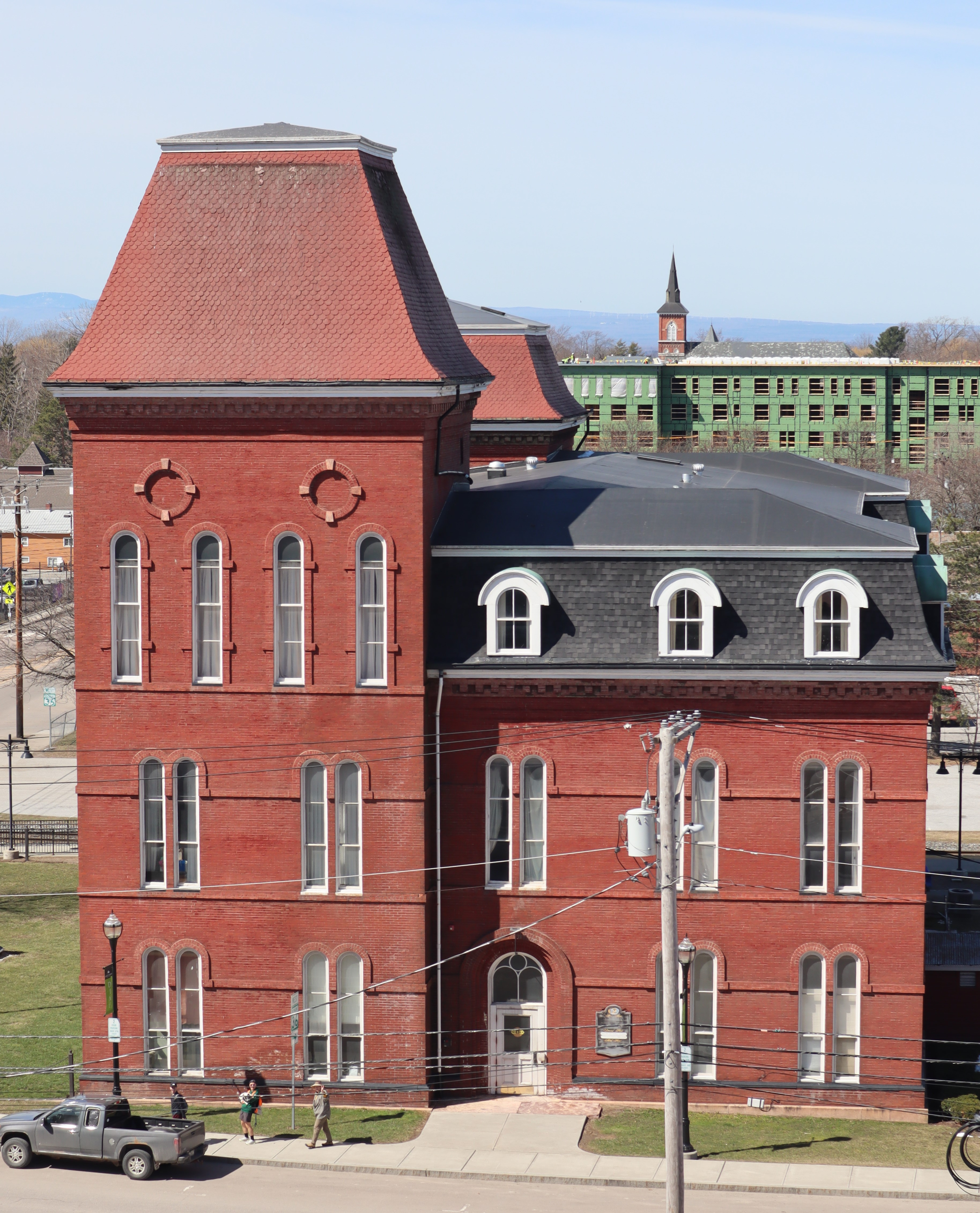
Railroad Headquarters Office Building on Federal Street

The Central Vermont Railroad Headquarters complex is located just west of St. Albans' central business district, and is roughly bisected by Lake Street. It is bounded north of Lake Street by Pine and Federal Streets, and south of Lake by Houghton, Market, and Allen Streets. It includes buildings originally used as maintenance sheds, a freight depot, roundhouse, and the main office building that served as the Central Vermont's headquarters. The latter structure, built in the 1870s and located on the north side of Lake Street, is the dominant feature of the complex, distinguished by its Second Empire architecture and pair of 3-1/2 story mansard-roofed towers. North of that building stands a c. 1900 switch house which now serves as the depot for the Amtrak station, and north of that is a large roundhouse. On the south side of Lake Street is a large complex of maintenance facilities, which have mostly been repurposed to other commercial and industrial uses.

The Central Vermont Railroad was formed in 1860 by consolidating a number of shorter lines, some of which had been bankrupted, into a single entity providing service from Montreal across Vermont and southern New England to the port cities of Boston, Massachusetts, New London, Connecticut, and later New York City. St. Albans was supposedly chosen as the headquarters site of the new railroad by J. Gregory Smith, a St. Albans native who became the railroad's first president. The property where its facilities are located had previously been developed on a smaller scale by the predecessor Vermont and Canada Railroad. Many of the former maintenance buildings, used for the construction and maintenance of the company's rolling stock, were built in the 1860s, along with the surviving headquarters building. By the turn of the 20th century, the CVR was Vermont's largest railroad operator. During the 20th century, its passenger business declined, and the four-track passenger depot, set just west of the headquarters, was demolished in 1963.

== See also ==
- National Register of Historic Places listings in Franklin County, Vermont
