= Vermonter (train) =

Amtrak passenger train in the northeast United States

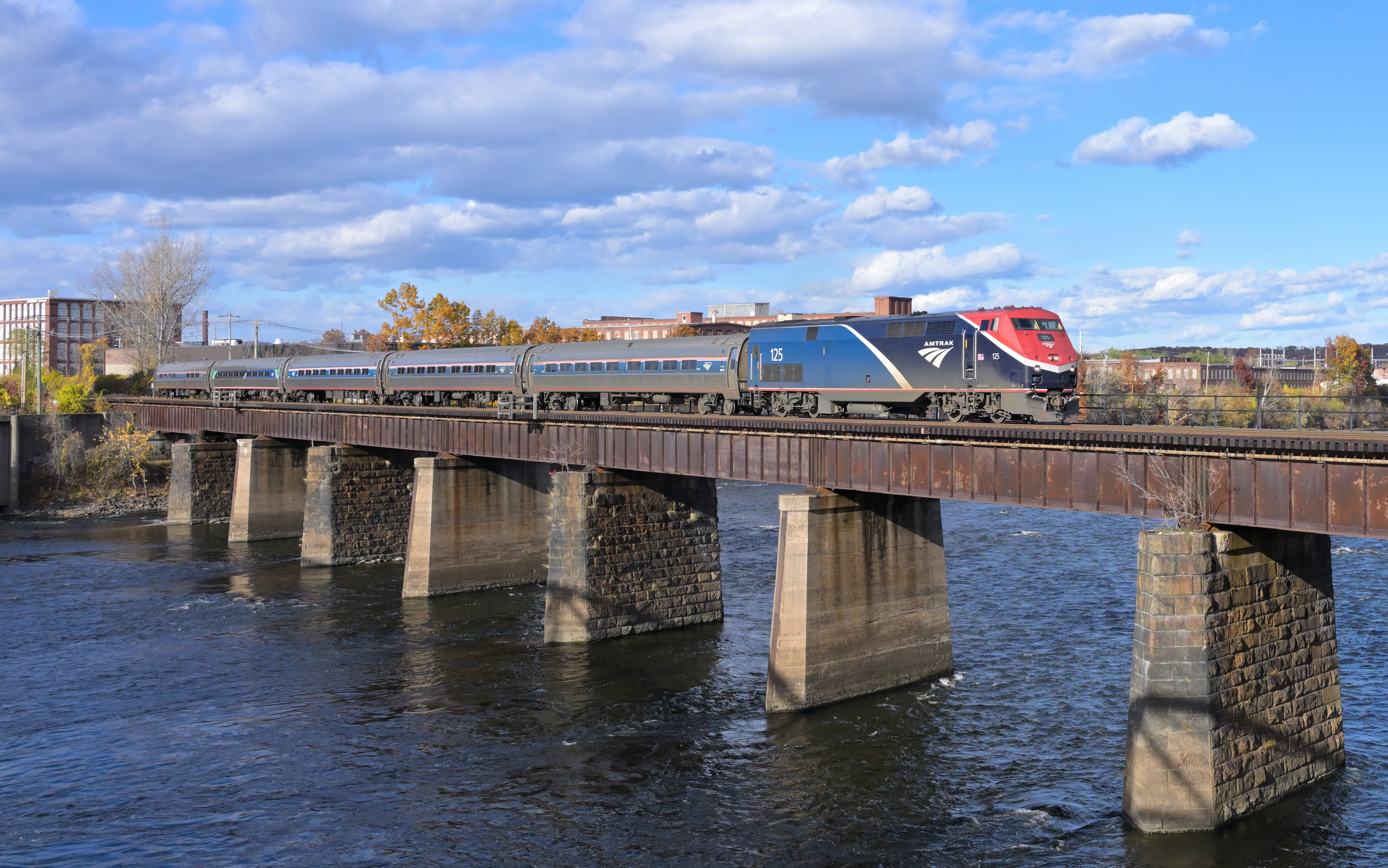
- The Vermonter in Holyoke, Massachusetts in 2025

Overview
- Service type: Inter-city rail
- Locale: New England, Mid-Atlantic states
- Predecessor: Montrealer
- First service: April 1, 1995
- Current operators: Amtrak in partnership with CTDOT, MassDOT and VTrans
- Annual ridership: 115,940 (FY 25) ▲1.2% (Note: Amtrak's Fiscal Year (FY) runs from October 1 of the prior year to September 30 of the named year.)

Route
- Termini: St. Albans, Vermont; Washington, D.C.
- Stops: 29 (weekdays); 30 (weekends)
- Distance travelled: 611 miles (983 km)
- Average journey time: 12 hours, 40 minutes (northbound); 12 hours, 57 minutes (southbound)
- Service frequency: Daily
- Train number: 54-57

On-board services
- Classes: Coach Class; Business Class
- Disabled access: All cars, all stations
- Catering facilities: Café
- Baggage facilities: Overhead racks

Technical
- Rolling stock: Amfleet cars
- Track gauge: 4 ft 8 1/2 in (1,435 mm) standard gauge
- Electrification: Overhead line: 12.5 kV AC at 60 Hz (New Haven–New York); 12 kV AC at 25 Hz (New York–Washington)
- Operating speed: 48 mph (77 km/h) (avg.); 125 mph (201 km/h) (top)
- Track owners: NECR, MassDOT, MNCR, Amtrak

The Vermonter is a passenger train operated by Amtrak between St. Albans, Vermont, and Washington, D.C., via New York City. It replaced the overnight Montrealer, which terminated in Montreal until 1995. Amtrak receives funding from the states of Connecticut, Massachusetts, and Vermont for Vermonter operations north of New Haven.

Ridership has steadily increased since pre-COVID ridership peaked in 2019 at 99,280. After falling to just 18,585 riders in FY21, Ridership rebounded 369.6% in 2022, followed by an increase of 14.5% in FY23 and a further 14.6% in FY24. During fiscal year 2025, the Vermonter carried 115,940 passengers (not including riders between New Haven and Washington, D.C.), a 1.2% increase from FY24. Despite the increase in ridership, the route still operated at a $3,600,000 loss for FY25. Revenue from all sources was $9,400,000 with $3,300,000 in revenue coming from ticket sales.

== History ==
=== Montrealer ===
The Vermonter was preceded by an overnight train between Montreal and Washington that was known as the Montrealer, which was inaugurated in 1924 as a joint service of the Pennsylvania Railroad, the New Haven Railroad, the Boston & Maine Railroad, the Central Vermont Railway and the Canadian National Railway. Another train, the Ambassador, ran the same route during the daytime, but terminated in New York City. Both services used the Boston and Maine's Connecticut River Line south of Vernon, Vermont, rather than the route prior to 2014 over the New England Central. Amtrak took over the train in 1971, and continued operating it until 1995 (excepting a brief suspension from 1987 to 1989).

Starting around 1940, the Central Vermont Railway operated a train between St. Albans and White River Junction also called the Vermonter. It departed St. Albans in the evening, arriving around midnight or later in White River Junction. Sleeper cars were transferred to Boston or New York City-bound trains. It left White River Junction in the middle of the night, arriving in St. Albans in the early morning. The train was discontinued on November 5, 1965. This service lends its name to the modern incarnation of the Vermonter.

=== Vermonter ===
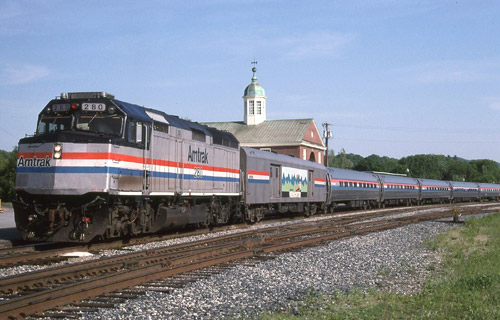
The Vermonter at White River Junction, Vermont, in 1996

The Vermonter replaced the Montrealer on April 1, 1995, bringing daytime Amtrak service to Vermont.

Business Class was added to replace the sleeping cars that were taken out of service upon the change to the Vermonter. The route was changed to allow travelers from Vermont to again stop in Springfield and Hartford. This was made possible by the use of cab cars, or engineer positions on both ends, so that the train could travel east from Springfield to Palmer, Massachusetts, and reverse direction to continue north on the Central Vermont. This detour added an hour of running time, but at the time was judged more practical than seeking to use the direct route over the then-decayed former Boston and Maine Railroad trackage owned by the Guilford Rail System. The train travels from Washington to New Haven on the Northeast Corridor, where electric locomotives are substituted for the diesel locomotives used north of that location.

Vermont declined to pay for continuing the Vermonter to Montreal due to high labor and terminal costs in Montreal. For a time, Amtrak offered passengers a connecting Amtrak Thruway bus service, operated by Vermont Transit, which met the train at St. Albans for connections to and from Montreal. Ridership plunged when the train schedule was moved two hours earlier, requiring a southbound departure before 5:00 a.m. The schedule was returned to its previous position, but the service was dropped by Vermont Transit (which had been running it without a subsidy as part of its regular schedule) on October 30, 2005.

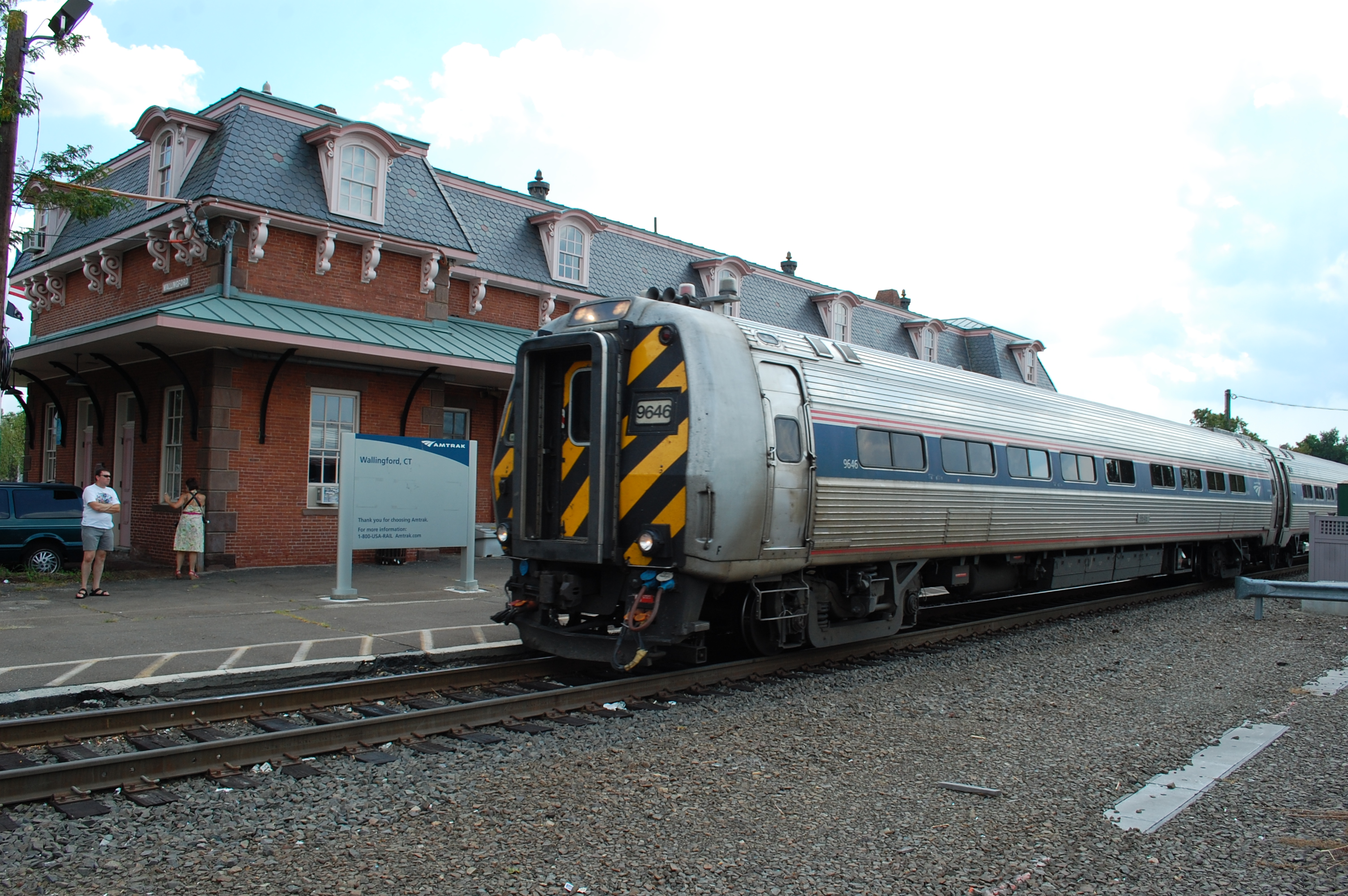
Vermonter at Wallingford, Connecticut

On October 30, 2006, the Vermonter began stopping at the towns of Wallingford and Windsor Locks (near Bradley International Airport) in Connecticut for the first time.

In the late 2000s, Amtrak and the State of Vermont considered the purchase of diesel multiple unit (DMU) trainsets for use on the New Haven–St. Albans stretch of the line, with Amtrak offering a $2 million grant to help make the switch and market the new service. The new cars would purportedly have saved $4.25 million over three years, being four times more fuel efficient than a locomotive-hauled train. In 2008, the Vermont state legislature approved the purchase of five cars from Colorado Railcar at a cost of $18.2 million, but the company closed while the decision was awaiting approval of Governor Jim Douglas. With no other DMU designs available that were capable of operating in mixed traffic with other trains, the plan was dropped.

On November 9, 2010, the State of Vermont, Amtrak, and New England Central began a $70 million project to increase train speeds along the route in Vermont to 59 miles per hour (95 km/h) between St. Albans and White River Junction, Vermont, and to 79 miles per hour (127 km/h) between White River Junction and Vernon, Vermont.

On October 5, 2012, the Federal Railroad Administration announced the completion of track work within the states of Vermont and New Hampshire for the above-mentioned stimulus plan. Within the states of Vermont and New Hampshire 190 miles (310 km) of track were refurbished. The track work included installation of continuous welded rail, road-crossing improvements, ballast replacement, tie replacement, bridge repair and renovation, and embankment improvements. The top speed of the line within Vermont was increased to 79 miles per hour (127 km/h). The Massachusetts portion of the track work was completed in 2015.

On October 5, 2015, the southbound Vermonter derailed in Northfield, Vermont, after striking a rock slide. Five cars and the engine derailed; the engine and an empty car slid down an embankment. Five passengers and two crew members were injured, one seriously.

Starting June 9, 2018, the Vermonter no longer serves the Berlin and Wallingford stations in Connecticut. These locations are served by other Amtrak trains and by the new Hartford Line commuter rail service.

In March 2020, the Vermonter was truncated to New Haven as part of a reduced service plan due to the COVID-19 pandemic. The move was forced after the pandemic prompted Vermont Governor Phil Scott to declare a state of emergency. The Vermonter resumed its full route on July 19, 2021, with $1 promotional fares on that date for travel within Vermont.

=== 2014 route change ===
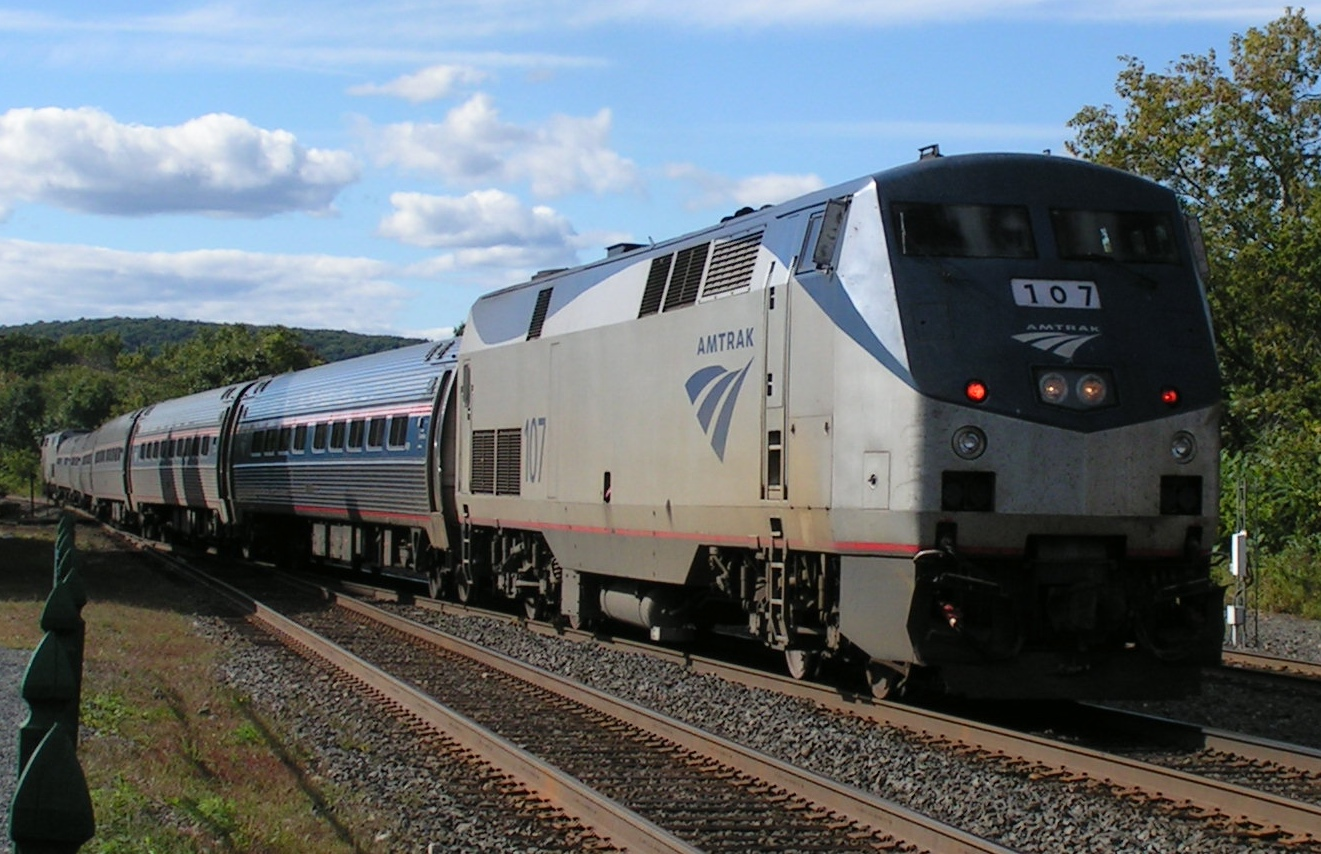
A Vermonter backing up at Palmer in 2007. Visible are two GE P42DCs and six Amfleet cars.

Until 1987, the Montrealer traveled on the Connecticut River Line between Springfield and Brattleboro with a stop in Northampton. Due to the deteriorating condition of the tracks in that section, Amtrak ceased service by the train.

When the Vermonter service restored train service between Springfield's Union Station, Brattleboro and points north in 1995, the Vermonter traveled a somewhat-indirect route: east to Palmer, Massachusetts, and then north up the east side of the Connecticut River via Amherst, Massachusetts. It used CSX Transportation's Boston Subdivision between Springfield and Palmer. At Palmer, it made a backup move on to the New England Central Railroad (NECR), as no direct track connection existed. Massachusetts later rehabilitated the more-direct Connecticut River Line route with $10 million in state and $73 million in federal American Recovery and Reinvestment Act funds.

During rehabilitation of the Connecticut River Line, Vermonter service was restored to it on December 29, 2014. With the re-route, the train ceased stopping at Amherst, but a stop was restored to Northampton and, for the first time for Amtrak, a stop at Greenfield was added. The re-route and consequent elimination of the backup move saved about 25 minutes of travel time between Springfield and Brattleboro when the line rehabilitation was completed, in early 2015.

Although the backup move at Palmer is eliminated by the re-route, a short backup move at Springfield is still required due to the layout of the tracks. The tracks at Springfield Union Station run east-west, so the northbound Vermonter needs to curve into the station, back out, and switch back onto the tracks continuing north; the opposite move occurs for southbound trains.

In January 2015, the number of Vermonter riders using the two new stations (in Northampton and Greenfield) was up 84 percent compared to the equivalent station in Amherst the previous year. An infill stop in Holyoke was added on August 27, 2015.

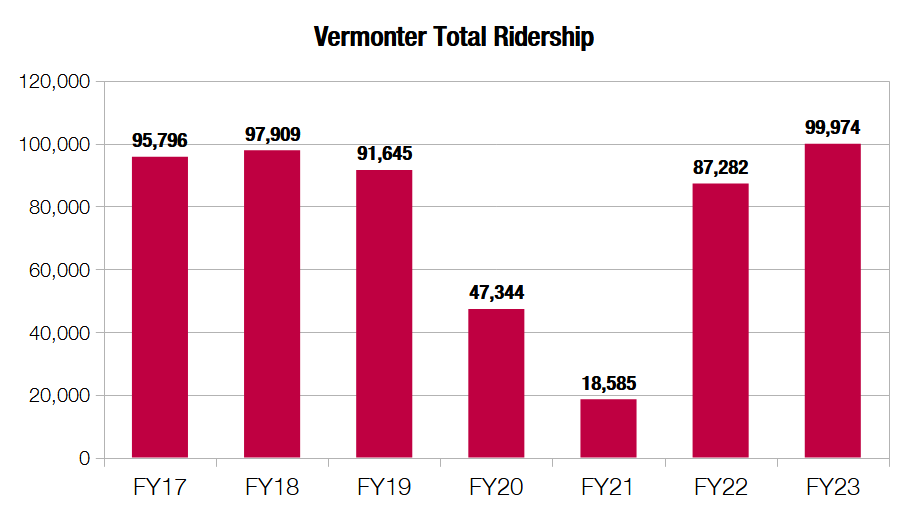
Vermonter Total Ridership by Year (FY17-FY23)

On March 26, 2020, service north of New Haven was temporarily suspended. On November 30, 2020, service was cut back further from New Haven to New York. This was done in response to the COVID-19 pandemic. Service to St. Albans resumed on July 19, 2021.

=== Planned extension to Montreal ===
Efforts have been underway for many years to extend the Vermonter to Montreal. In 2012, the Federal Railroad Administration awarded $7.9 million to allow for the upgrade of the existing freight rail line between St. Albans and the Canada–US border. Work on this project was completed in late 2014.

On March 16, 2015, Canada and the United States signed the "Agreement on Land, Rail, Marine, and Air Transport Preclearance Between the Government of the United States of America and the Government of Canada". The agreement would allow for the establishment of a preclearance customs and immigration facility within Central Station in Montreal that could be used by both an extended Vermonter and Amtrak's existing Adirondack train.

Before the Vermonter can be extended to Montreal, the United States Congress must pass enabling legislation for the preclearance agreement and the Parliament of Canada must ratify the agreement. Construction of a preclearance facility in Central Station is expected to take about three years: one year for planning and permitting and two years for construction. Construction of the preclearance facility is not expected to start until after the preclearance agreement has been approved by both governments. Enabling legislation was enacted by the United States on December 16, 2016, as the Promoting Travel, Commerce, and National Security Act of 2016. As of late 2018, logistics have delayed the extended route's introduction until at least 2023. As of late 2021, according to Vermont transportation officials, while the United States remained active on the project, interest and engagement from regional and federal authorities on the Canadian side had frozen.

In 2021, the Vermont Agency of Transportation studied potential infrastructure upgrades that would allow the Vermonter to reach 79 mph (127 km/h) on sections in Vermont, up from 59 mph (95 km/h). Saving around 1 hour 30 minutes between New Haven and Montreal, the upgrades are forecast to incentivize an additional 31,100 to 40,900 riders per year by 2040. A key component to increasing the speed limit would be the installation of centralized traffic control from Greenfield to Brattleboro and from White River Junction to the border. In 2026, officials indicated that it would be several years before construction of the preclearance facility at Montreal would begin.

On August 14, 2026, the Federal Railroad Administration awarded a $4 million Consolidated Rail Infrastructure and Safety Improvement grant to Vermont's Northwest Regional Planning Commission to study NECR's 112-year-old bridge over Lake Champlain between Alburgh and Swanton. Rail traffic on the bridge was limited to 5 mph (8 km/h), which would not be sufficient for passenger service The study will develop a long-term solution for the bridge, which could include major rehabilitation or replacement.

== Operation ==
=== Equipment ===
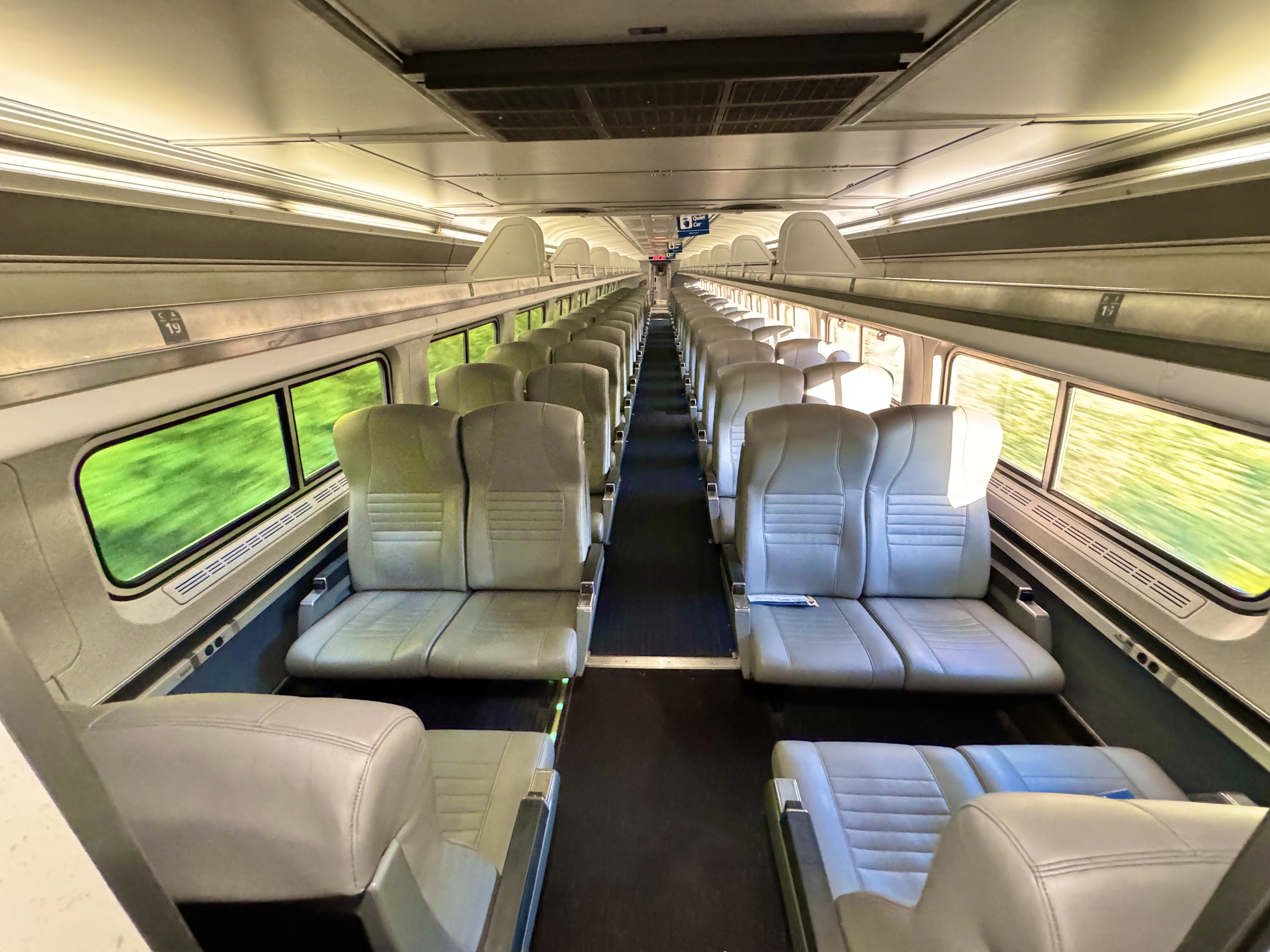
A coach car aboard the Vermonter as it rolls through Braintree, Vermont

A typical Vermonter consists of a locomotive, a Amfleet club car (with 1×2 Business Class seating, a food service area, and a lounge area with booths), and four Amfleet coaches.

Between St. Albans and New Haven, trains are pulled by a GE Genesis diesel locomotive at speeds up to 110 miles per hour (177 km/h). Between New Haven and Washington, the service operates over the Northeast Corridor which has overhead electric lines and trains are pulled by Siemens ACS-64 electric locomotives at speeds up to 125 miles per hour (201 km/h).

By 2031, the train's existing equipment is expected to be replaced by Amtrak Airo trainsets, Amtrak's branding for trainsets combining Siemens Venture passenger cars with a Siemens Charger diesel-electric locomotive. The trainsets for the Vermonter will include six passenger cars with a food service area and a mix of 2×2 Coach Class and 1×2 Business Class seating. The car nearest the locomotive will be an "Auxiliary Power Vehicle" (APV) equipped with a pantograph to draw power from overhead lines and supply electricity to four electric traction motors in the APV and four in the locomotive. The design is intended to allow near-seamless transitions between diesel and electric operation, eliminating the need for a time-consuming locomotive change in New Haven.

=== Classes of service ===
All classes of service include complimentary Wi-Fi, an electric outlet (120 V, 60 Hz AC) at each seat, reading lamps, fold-out tray tables. Reservations are required on all trains, tickets may be purchased online, from an agent at some stations, a ticketing machine at most stations, or, at a higher cost, from the conductor on the train.

- Coach Class: 2×2 seating. Passengers self-select seats on a first-come, first-served basis.
- Business Class: 1×2 seating with more legroom than coach. Passengers receive complimentary soft drinks. Seats assigned in advance.

=== Route ===
Map of the Vermonter route

The Vermonter uses Amtrak and CTDOT's electrified Northeast Corridor line from Washington, D.C., to New Haven, Connecticut. After switching to a diesel locomotive at New Haven, it then uses the Amtrak-owned New Haven–Springfield Line north to Springfield, Massachusetts, and the MassDOT-owned Connecticut River Line between Springfield and Northfield, Massachusetts. From Northfield to St. Albans, Vermont, it traverses New England Central Railroad trackage. Weekend trains have an additional stop at Metropark station in Iselin, New Jersey.

== Stations ==
State	Mile (km)	Location	Station	Connections
Vermont	0 (0)	St. Albans	St. Albans	Green Mountain Transit: 96, 109, 110, 115, 116
Vermont	24 (39)	Essex Junction	Essex Junction	Green Mountain Transit: 2, 4
Vermont	47 (76)	Waterbury	Waterbury	Green Mountain Transit: 83, 86, 100
Vermont	56 (90)	Montpelier	Montpelier	
Vermont	86 (138)	Randolph	Randolph	Intercity bus: Tri-Valley Transit
Vermont	118 (190)	White River Junction	White River Junction	Green Mountain Railroad; Tri-Valley Transit: 89er Advance Transit: Orange Line
Vermont	131 (211)	Windsor	Windsor	
New Hampshire	140 (230)	Claremont	Claremont	
Vermont	157 (253)	Bellows Falls	Bellows Falls	The Current: 2, 53, 55, 57; Intercity bus: Greyhound
Vermont	181 (291)	Brattleboro	Brattleboro; Union Station	The Current: 4, 5, 7, 7S, 10, 11, 53, Brattleboro White Line
Massachusetts	205 (330)	Greenfield	John W. Olver; Transit Center	Amtrak: Valley Flyer; FRTA: 20, 21, 24, 31, 32, 41; Intercity bus: Greyhound
Massachusetts	224 (360)	Northampton	Northampton; Union Station	Amtrak: Valley Flyer; PVTA: B48, G73E, R41, R44
Massachusetts	235 (378)	Holyoke	Holyoke	Amtrak: Valley Flyer; PVTA: R24, R29, T24, X90
Massachusetts	245 (394)	Springfield	Springfield; Union Station	Amtrak: Lake Shore Limited, Northeast Regional, Hartford Line, Valley Flyer; CTrail: Hartford Line; PVTA Bus: B4, B6, B7, B7S, B12, B17, G1, G2, G2E, G3, P20, P20E, P21, P21E, R10, R14, X92, LOOP; Intercity bus: Greyhound, Peter Pan Bus Lines
Connecticut	260 (420)	Windsor Locks	Windsor Locks	Amtrak: Hartford Line, Northeast Regional, Valley Flyer; CTrail: Hartford Line; CTtransit Bus: 24, 96, 905
Connecticut	271 (436)	Hartford	Hartford; Union Station	Amtrak: Hartford Line, Northeast Regional, Valley Flyer; CTrail: Hartford Line; CTfastrak: 101 Hartford/New Britain, 102 Hartford/New Britain/Bristol, 128 Hartford/Westfarms-New Britain; CTtransit Bus: 30, 45X, 62, 64, 66, 72, 74, 82, 83, 84, 901, 902, 903, 904, 905, SC, DASH, PPB
Connecticut	289 (465)	Meriden	Meriden; Transit Center	Amtrak: Hartford Line, Northeast Regional, Valley Flyer; CTrail: Hartford Line; CTtransit Bus: 215, 561, 563, 564, 565, 950
Connecticut	308 (496)	New Haven	New Haven; Union Station	Amtrak: Acela, Hartford Line, Northeast Regional; CTrail: Hartford Line, Shore Line East; Metro-North: ■ New Haven Line; CTtransit New Haven; Intercity bus: Greyhound, Peter Pan
Connecticut	321 (517)	Bridgeport	Bridgeport	Amtrak: Northeast Regional; Metro-North: ■ New Haven Line, ■ Waterbury Branch; Greater Bridgeport Transit Authority
Connecticut	344 (554)	Stamford	Stamford; Transportation Center	Amtrak: Acela, Northeast Regional; Metro-North: ■ New Haven Line, ■ New Canaan Branch; CTtransit Stamford; Intercity bus: Greyhound
New York	379 (610)	New York	New York; Penn Station	Amtrak (long-distance): Cardinal, Crescent, Lake Shore Limited, Palmetto, Silver Meteor; Amtrak (intercity): Acela, Adirondack, Berkshire Flyer, Carolinian, Empire Service, Ethan Allen Express, Keystone Service, Maple Leaf, Northeast Regional, Pennsylvanian; Long Island Rail Road: ■ City Terminal Zone, ■ Port Washington Branch; NJ Transit: ■ North Jersey Coast Line, ■ Northeast Corridor Line, ■ Gladstone Branch, ■ Montclair–Boonton Line, ■ Morristown Line; NYC Subway: MTA Bus
New Jersey	390 (630)	Newark	Newark; Penn Station	Amtrak: Acela, Cardinal, Carolinian, Crescent, Keystone Service, Palmetto, Pennsylvanian, Silver Meteor; Newark Light Rail; NJ Transit Rail: ■ North Jersey Coast Line, ■ Northeast Corridor Line, ■ Raritan Valley Line; PATH: NWK-WTC; NJ Transit Bus; Intercity bus: Greyhound, Coach USA, Fullington Trailways
New Jersey	404 (650)	Iselin	Metropark	Amtrak: Acela, Crescent, Keystone Service, Northeast Regional, Palmetto; NJ Transit Rail: ■ Northeast Corridor Line; NJ Transit Bus
New Jersey	437 (703)	Trenton	Trenton; Transit Center	Amtrak: Cardinal, Carolinian, Crescent, Keystone Service, Northeast Regional, Palmetto, Pennsylvanian, Silver Meteor; NJ Transit Rail: ■ Northeast Corridor Line, ■ River Line; SEPTA Regional Rail: ■ Trenton Line; NJ Transit Bus, SEPTA Suburban Bus
Pennsylvania	470 (760)	Philadelphia	30th Street Station	Amtrak: Acela, Cardinal, Carolinian, Crescent, Keystone Service, Northeast Regional, Palmetto, Pennsylvanian, Silver Meteor; SEPTA Regional Rail: all routes NJ Transit Rail: ■ Atlantic City Line; SEPTA Metro: SEPTA City Bus, SEPTA Suburban Bus, New Jersey Transit Bus; Intercity bus: Megabus, Martz Trailways
Delaware	496 (798)	Wilmington	Wilmington	Amtrak: Acela, Cardinal, Carolinian, Crescent, Northeast Regional, Palmetto, Silver Meteor; SEPTA Regional Rail: ■ Wilmington/Newark Line; DART First State; Intercity bus: Greyhound
Maryland	564 (908)	Baltimore	Baltimore; Penn Station	Amtrak: Acela, Cardinal, Carolinian, Crescent, Northeast Regional, Palmetto, Silver Meteor; MARC: ■ Penn Line; Light RailLink; MTA Maryland, Charm City Circulator
Maryland	575 (925)	Linthicum	BWI Airport	Amtrak: Acela, Crescent, Northeast Regional; MARC: ■ Penn Line; Shuttle to Baltimore/Washington International Airport; MTA Maryland, UMBC Transit
Maryland	596 (959)	New Carrollton	New Carrollton	Amtrak: Northeast Regional; MARC: ■ Penn Line; Metro: Orange Line, Silver Line; Metrobus, TheBus, MTA Maryland; Intercity bus: Greyhound
District of Columbia	605 (974)	Washington	Washington; Union Station	Amtrak: Acela, Cardinal, Carolinian, Crescent, Floridian, Northeast Regional, Palmetto, Silver Meteor; MARC: ■ Brunswick Line, ■ Camden Line, ■ Penn Line; VRE: ■ Manassas Line, ■ Fredericksburg Line; Metro: Red Line; Metrobus, MTA Maryland, Loudoun County Transit, PRTC; Intercity bus: Greyhound, Megabus, Amtrak Thruway, BestBus, Peter Pan, OurBus

== See also ==
- Adirondack (train)
- Ethan Allen Express
- Maple Leaf (train)
