= Northfield station (Vermont) =

- Central Vermont Railway Depot
- U.S. National Register of Historic Places
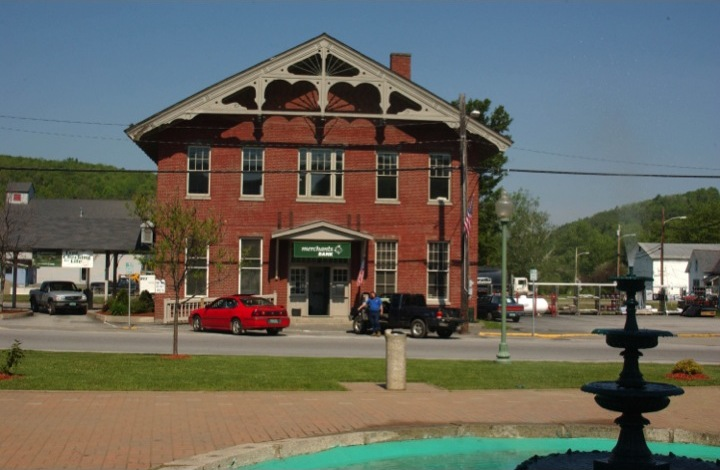

- Location within Vermont Location within the United States
- Location: W end of Depot Sq; Northfield, Vermont
- Coordinates: 44°8′55″N 72°39′30″W
- Built: 1852
- NRHP reference No.: 75000145
- Added to NRHP: April 1, 1975

The Central Vermont Railway Depot is a historic former train station at Depot Square in the village of Northfield, Vermont. Built in 1852, it is believed to be the oldest surviving railroad station in the state. It was listed on the National Register of Historic Places in 1975.

== Description and history ==
Situated on the west end of Northfield's Depot Square green, the Central Vermont Railway Depot was once part of a relatively large complex of buildings built by the Central Vermont Railroad, including the Northfield Wood Company and common railyard buildings. Today, many of these buildings still stand; some have been converted into small offices by modern companies (such as TDS Telecom), others are used as storage by a local hardware and lumber store, while many remain vacant. In the 1970s, the decline of industry in the area took its toll on the station, and it was forced to cease operation. After several years of increasing disrepair, the side wings were demolished. As of 2006, the two nearest rail stations still in operation are in Randolph to the south, and Montpelier to the north. Roxbury, a small village 10 miles (16 km) south of Northfield, had a rail station as well, which closed shortly after the Central Vermont Railway Depot. The depot building is currently occupied by a Merchant's Bank location.

The depot is a two-story masonry structure, built out of brick laid in common bond, which rest on a cut stone foundation. It is covered by a gabled roof with unusually deep eaves (4 feet (1.2 m)) supported by decorative rafter ends. Windows are mainly double-hung sash, set in rectangular openings with granite sills and lintels. The window above the main entrance (facing the Depot Square oval) is a Palladian-style three-part window. The gable above the front facade is decorated with Stick style woodwork, as is that on the rear (track-facing) side. The depot was built in 1852, but underwent significant alteration in the late 1890s. At that time, side wings were removed, and the Victorian Stick style decorations were added. A canopy over the platform between the depot and the tracks was removed in the mid-20th century.

== See also ==
- National Register of Historic Places listings in Washington County, Vermont

Preceding station	Central Vermont Railway	Following station
Roxbury toward New London	Main Line	Riverton toward St. Johns
