= West Milton Bridge =

- U.S. National Register of Historic Places
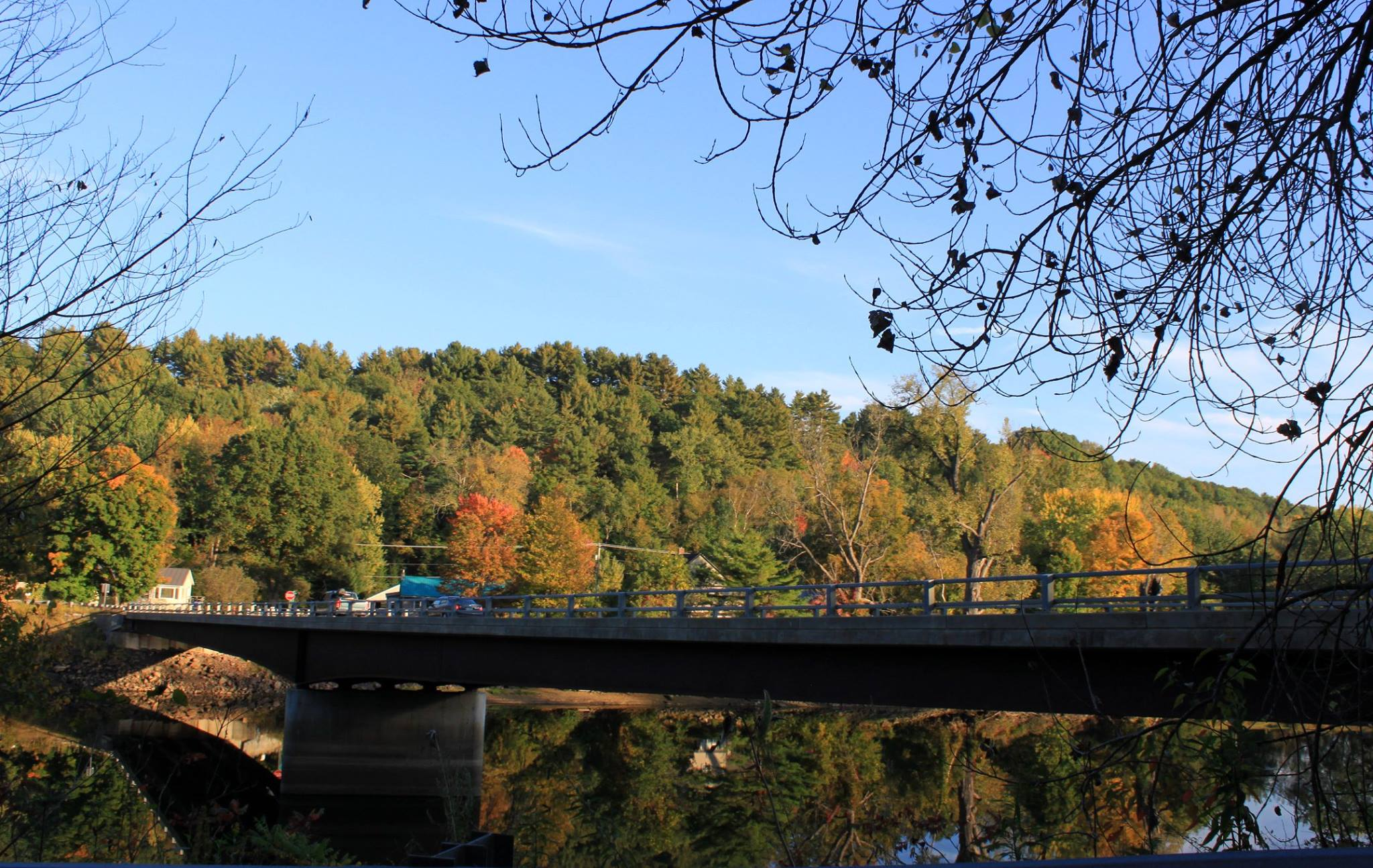
- The modern bridge in 2014

- Location within Vermont Location within the United States
- Location: Bear Trap Rd. over the Lamoille River, Milton, Vermont
- Coordinates: 44°37′56″N 73°10′18″W
- Area: less than one acre
- Built: 1902
- Built by: United Construction Co.
- Architectural style: Double-span through truss
- MPS: Metal Truss, Masonry, and Concrete Bridges in Vermont MPS
- NRHP reference No.: 92001173
- Added to NRHP: September 8, 1992

The West Milton Bridge is a steel girder bridge carrying Bear Trap Road across the Lamoille River in Milton, Vermont, United States. It was built as a replacement for a 1902 Pennsylvania truss bridge, which was relocated to the site of the Swanton Covered Railroad Bridge, and is listed on the National Register of Historic Places.

== Setting ==
The West Milton Bridge is located in the small rural village of West Milton, which is little more than a strip of residences and rural businesses on the eastern shore of the Lamoille River, which empties into Lake Champlain approximately one mile to the west.

== Historic bridge ==
The former West Milton Bridge was a two-span Pennsylvania truss bridge, with an overall length of 329 feet (100 m) (the individual spans each being 162 feet (49 m)) and 18 feet (5.5 m) wide, carrying a single lane of traffic. The portal clearance was 14 feet (4.3 m). The bridge was built in 1902, and its trusses are among a small number of surviving Pennsylvania trusses in the state. The bridge is also notable for surviving the state's devastating 1927 floods, which destroyed more than 1,200 bridges. The trusses were manufactured by the American Bridge Company, and the bridge was assembled by the United Construction Company of Albany, New York.

The Swanton Covered Railroad Bridge, spanning the Missisquoi River, was built in 1895. By 1973, when it was listed on the National Register, it had been taken out of service and was in deteriorating condition. It was destroyed by fire in 1987. The trusses of the West Milton Bridge were moved to its location, and now form part of a multi-use trail.

== See also ==
- National Register of Historic Places listings in Chittenden County, Vermont
- List of bridges on the National Register of Historic Places in Vermont
