= St. Albans station (Vermont) =

Amtrak station in St. Albans, Vermont

St. Albans, VT
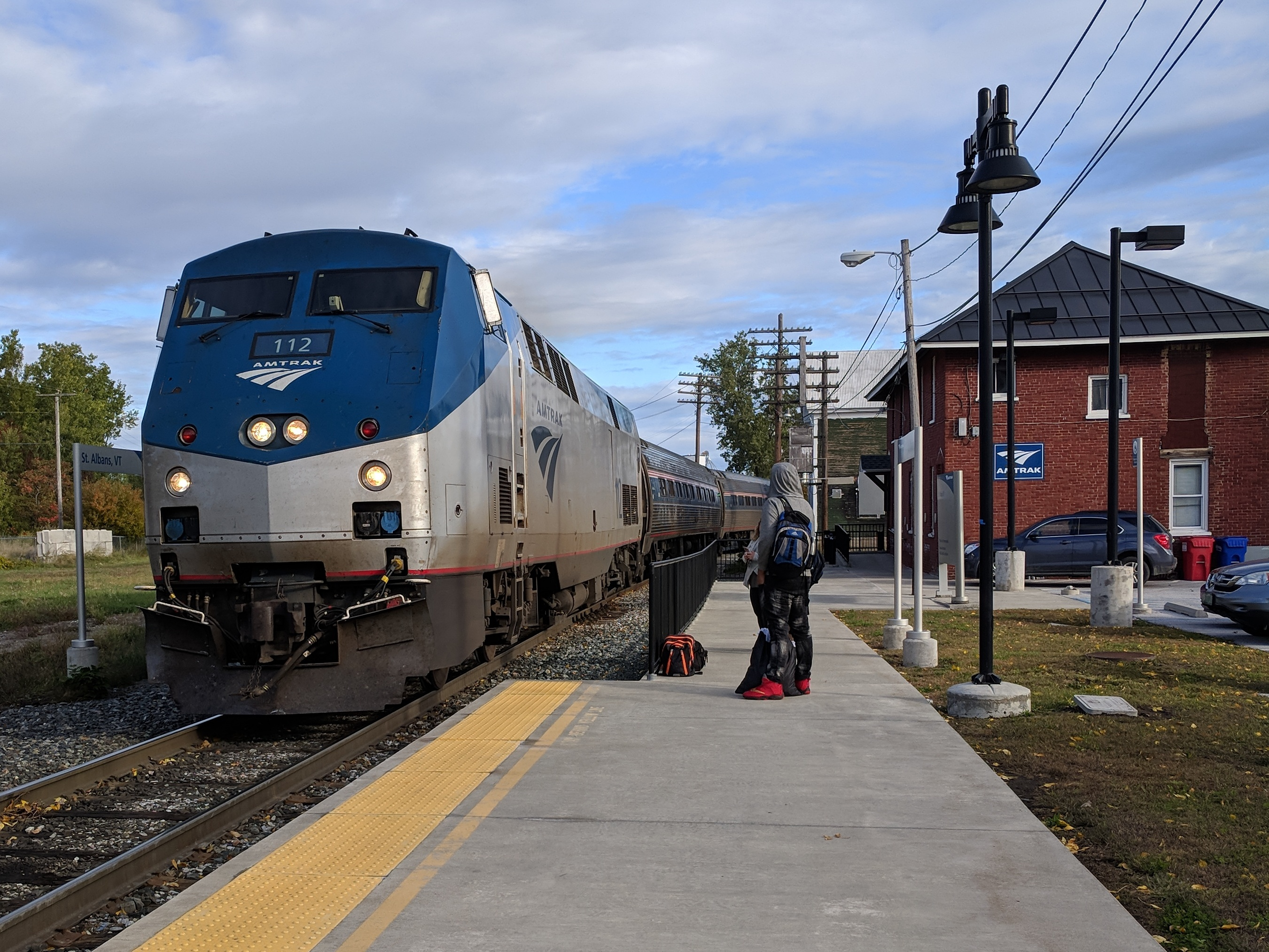
- The Vermonter at St. Albans in October 2018

General information
- Location: 40 Federal Street; St. Albans, Vermont; United States
- Coordinates: 44°48′44″N 73°05′10″W
- Line: New England Central Railroad
- Platforms: 1 side platform
- Tracks: 1
- Connections: Green Mountain Transit (GMT): 96, 109, 110, 115, 116

Construction
- Accessible: Yes

Other information
- Station code: Amtrak: SAB

History
- Opened: January 10, 1851; September 29, 1972; July 19, 1989
- Closed: September 6, 1966; April 6, 1987
- Rebuilt: June 1867

Passengers
- FY 2025: 3,954 (Amtrak)

Services
Preceding station	Amtrak	Following station
Essex Junction toward Washington, D.C.	Vermonter	Terminus
Former services
Preceding station	Amtrak	Following station
Essex Junction toward Washington, D.C.	Montrealer	Saint-Lambert toward Montreal
Preceding station	Central Vermont Railway	Following station
Oakland toward New London	Main Line	North Junction toward St. Johns
Terminus	Swanton Subdivision	North Junction toward East Alburgh
Terminus	Richford Subdivision	Chadwick toward Richford
Location

St. Albans station is an Amtrak train station in St. Albans, Vermont, United States. It is the northern terminus of the daily Vermonter service.

Service to St. Albans on the Vermont Central Railroad began in 1851. A new station with a large trainshed and an adjacent office building were completed in 1867 as part of major construction of the railroad's main shops. Service under the Central Vermont Railway (later part of the Grand Trunk Railway and Canadian National Railway) continued until 1966; the station was demolished in 1963. Amtrak service resumed in 1972 using a former switch house as a station building. The station has been served by the Montrealer from 1972 to 1987 and 1989 to 1995, and by the Vermonter since 1995.

The office building is used as the headquarters of the New England Central Railroad, successor of the Central Vermont. The office building and current station building are part of the Central Vermont Railroad Headquarters, which was listed on the National Register of Historic Places in 1974.

== History ==
=== Construction ===
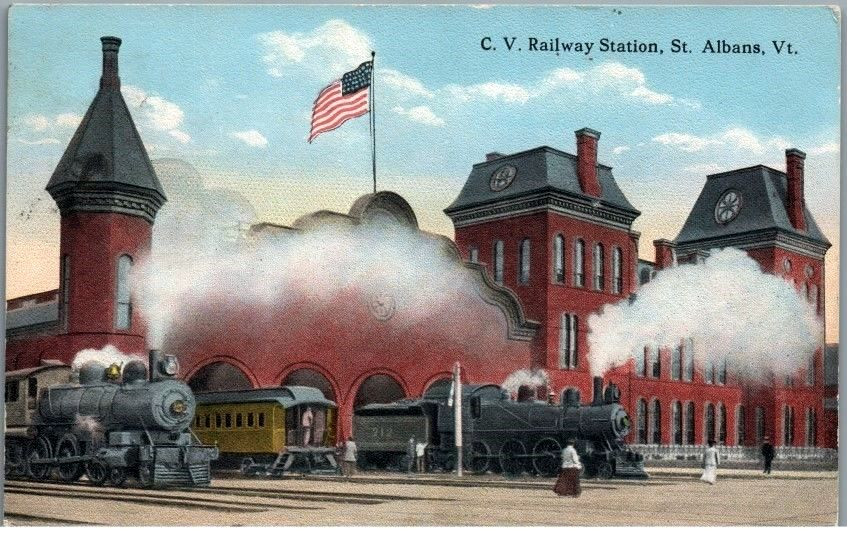
The trainshed and office building in the early 20th century

The Vermont and Canada Railroad, under control of the Vermont Central Railroad (VC), began service between Essex Junction and Rouses Point through St. Albans on January 10, 1851. The original VC combination depot (passenger and freight services in one building) has two platform tracks. In 1862, the VC began construction of a major expansion of its main shops in St. Albans, hometown of VC president John Gregory Smith.

Among the buildings constructed were a new station and adjacent office building, which were begun in 1866 and completed in June 1867. The brick station building, measuring 70 feet (21 m) by 22 feet (6.7 m), was attached to a four-track trainshed. The three-story red brick Second Empire office has two square towers at its southern corners. Both the towers and the main building have mansard roofs. The office building included indoor plumbing and hot-air central heating. Most passenger facilities were located in the station building, but the office building included a customs office on the first floor.

=== Declining service ===
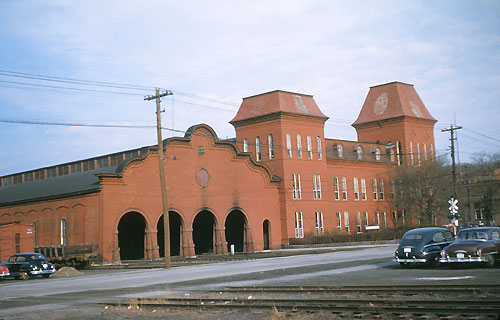
The trainshed and office building in 1956

The Vermont Central was reorganized as the Central Vermont Railway (CV) in 1873. On July 1, 1873, the CV-owned Missisquoi Railroad (later the Richmond Branch) opened as a branch line from St. Albans. The struggling CV became part of the Grand Trunk Railway in 1896. The Grand Trunk was in turn merged into the Canadian National Railway (CN) in 1923.

Four chimneys on the south facade of the office building were removed in 1915. A tower on the southwest corner of the trainshed was removed in 1923. Passenger service on the Richmond Branch ended on November 11, 1938. The CN demolished the station and trainshed in 1963, and passenger service ended with the discontinuance of the Montrealer on September 6, 1966. A local preservation group was formed in 1970; with the office building and remaining yard facilities placed on the National Register of Historic Places on January 21, 1974, as the Central Vermont Railroad Headquarters.

=== Amtrak service ===
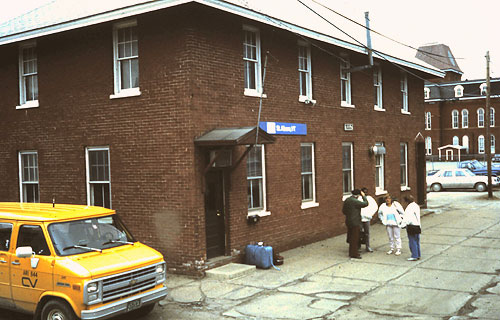
The Amtrak station building in 1987

Amtrak took over most intercity passenger service in the United States in 1971. A revived Montrealer began serving St. Albans on September 29, 1972. A small brick building north of the former trainshed, constructed around 1900 as a switch tower and yard office, was put into use as the new station building. The Montrealer was suspended from April 6, 1987, to July 19, 1989. It was curtailed to St. Albans as the Vermonter on April 2, 1995. The Vermonter uses the remaining wye connection of the 1990-abandoned Richmond Branch north of the station to reverse direction. The CV was sold and renamed as the New England Central Railroad (NECR) in 1995; the NECR continues to use the office building as its headquarters.

In March 2020, the station was temporarily closed and Vermonter service was suspended indefinitely north of New Haven, both part of a reduced service plan due to the coronavirus pandemic. Service was restored in July 2021.
