= Saint-Jean-d'Iberville station =

Railway station in Quebec, Canada

Coordinates: 45.3029°N 73.2541°W

Saint-Jean-d'Iberville
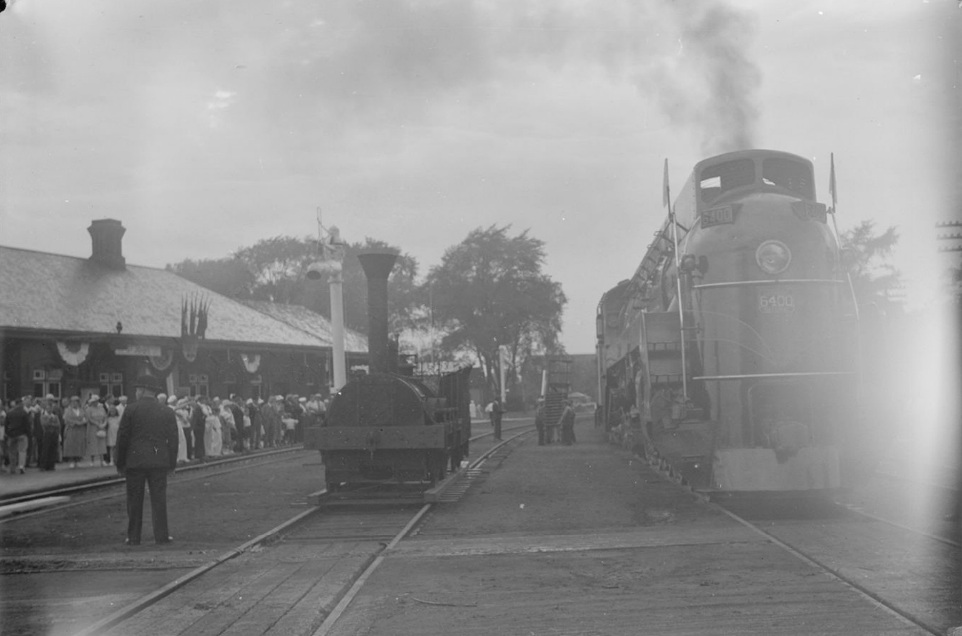
- In celebration of the 100th anniversary of the first train in Canada, a replica of an old steam engine used by The Champlain & St. Lawrence Railway was brought into the Saint-Jean-sur-Richelieu railway station in 1936

General information
- Location: 31 Frontenac Street, Saint-Jean-sur-Richelieu, Quebec; Canada
- Line: Rouses Point Subdivision

History
- Opened: 1890

National Historic Site of Canada
- Official name: Saint-Jean-d'Iberville Railway Station (Grand Trunk) National Historic Site of Canada
- Designated: 1976
- Former names: St. Johns
Former services post-1946
Preceding station	Canadian National Railway	Following station
St. Lambert toward Montreal	Central Vermont Route	Grand Ligne toward East Alburgh
St. Lambert toward Montreal	Green Mountain Flyer / Mount Royal	Rouses Point toward New York or Boston
Lacadie toward Montreal	St. Johns services	Grande Ligne toward Rouses Point
Lacadie toward Montreal	St. Johns services	Iberville toward Waterloo
Former services pre-1946
Preceding station	Canadian National Railway	Following station
St. Lambert toward Montreal	Central Vermont Route	through to CV
St. Lambert toward Montreal	Green Mountain Flyer / Mount Royal	Rouses Point toward New York or Boston
Lacadie toward Montreal	St. Johns services	Terminus
Lacadie toward Montreal	St. Johns services	Iberville toward Waterloo
Preceding station	Central Vermont Railway	Following station
through to CN	Main Line	Iberville toward New London
Location

Saint-Jean-d'Iberville station (French: Gare du Grand Tronc à Saint-Jean-d'Iberville，pronounced [ɡaʁ dy ɡʁɑ̃ tʁɔ̃ a sɛ̃ ʒɑ̃ dibɛʁvil]) is a former railway station in Saint-Jean-sur-Richelieu, Quebec, Canada. The station was built in 1890 by the Grand Trunk Railway and is located at 31 Frontenac Street.

Until September 3, 1966 the Boston & Maine's Montreal to Boston and New York Ambassador made daily stops at the station. The company's night train, Washingtonian southbound to Washington and Montrealer northbound to Montreal made nightly stops at the station until September 6, 1966. The station was omitted from stops when Amtrak reinstated the Montrealer in 1972.

It was recognized as a National Historic Site of Canada on June 15, 1976. Today it operates as a town tourism office.
