= Central Vermont Railway =

Railroad in the US and Canada

Overview
- Parent company: Canadian National Railway
- Reporting mark: CV
- Locale: Connecticut, Massachusetts, New Hampshire, Vermont, New York, and Quebec
- Dates of operation: 1848–1995
- Successor: New England Central

Technical
- Track gauge: 4 ft 8 1/2 in (1,435 mm) standard gauge
- Previous gauge: Originally built to 5 ft 6 in (1,676 mm)

The Central Vermont Railway (reporting mark CV) was a railroad that operated in the U.S. states of Connecticut, Massachusetts, New Hampshire, New York, and Vermont, as well as the Canadian province of Quebec. After decades of ownership by Canadian National Railway, the company was spun off under the name New England Central Railroad in 1995.

It connected Montreal, Quebec, with New London, Connecticut, using a route along the shores of Lake Champlain, through the Green Mountains and along the Connecticut River valley. It also connected Montreal to Boston, in eastern Massachusetts, through a junction with the Boston and Maine Railroad at White River Junction, Vermont.

== History ==
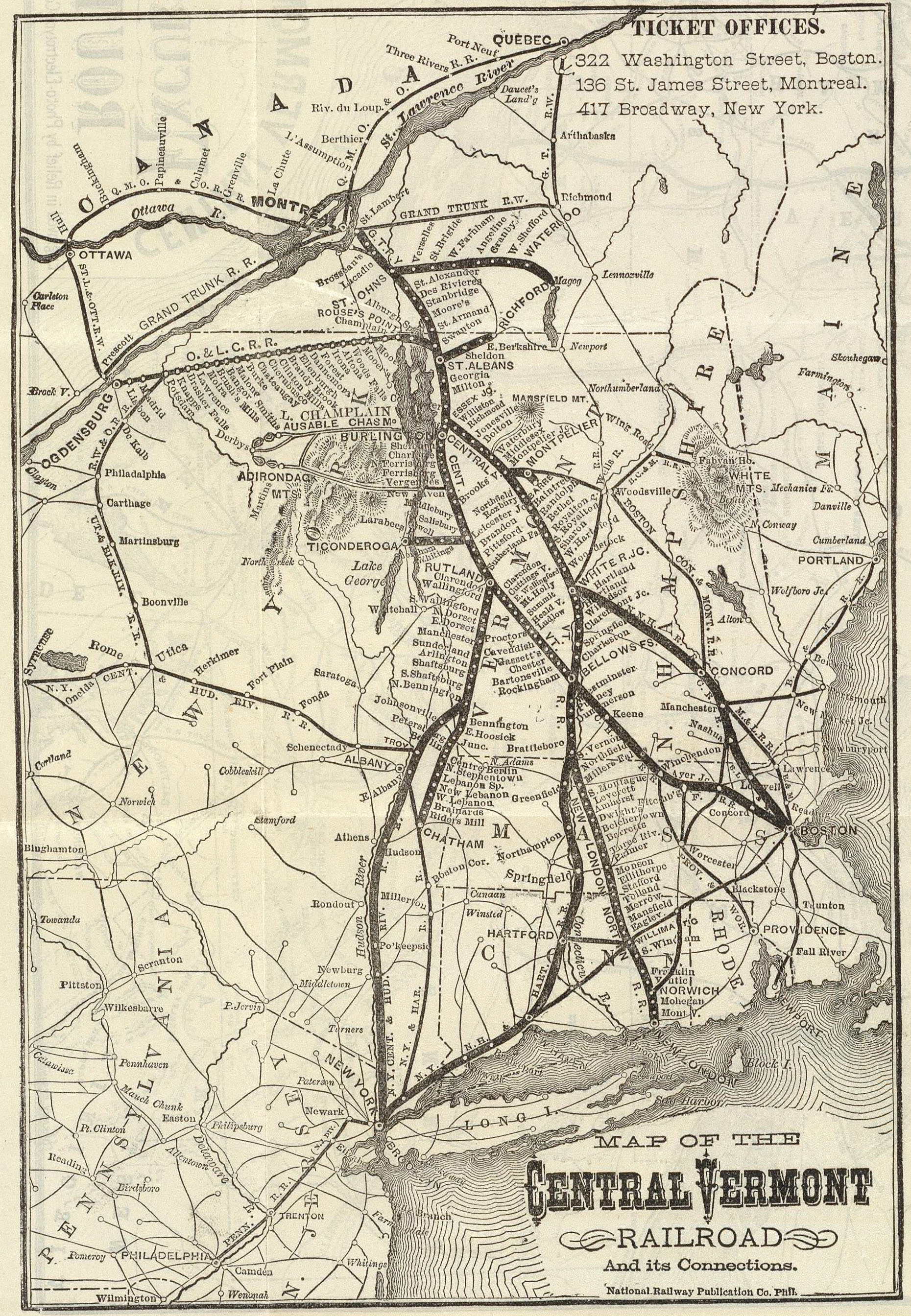
1879 map

The Vermont Central Railroad was chartered October 31, 1843, to build a line across the center of Vermont, running from Burlington on Lake Champlain east to the capital Montpelier, and then southeast and south to Windsor on the Connecticut River. Initial plans had the main line running through Montpelier. However, due to the difficulty of building through the Williamstown Gulf, a narrow valley south of Barre, Vermont, and to land interests of Charles Paine in Northfield, Vermont, a course to the west was selected. The state capital was to be served by a short branch line.

Construction began on December 15, 1845, and the first section, from White River Junction west to Bethel, opened on June 26, 1848. Subsequent sections opened to Roxbury on September 17, 1848, Northfield on October 10, 1848, Montpelier (including the branch from Montpelier Junction) on June 20, 1849, Middlesex on August 30, 1849, Waterbury on September 29, 1849, and the full distance to Burlington on December 31, 1849. The part along the Connecticut River from Hartford south to Windsor opened on February 13, 1849.

The Vermont and Canada Railroad was chartered October 31, 1845, as a continuation of the Vermont Central north and west to Rouses Point, New York, splitting at Essex Junction, Vermont (east of Burlington) and running north via St. Albans and Swanton. A branch split at Swanton and ran north to the border with Canada. On August 24, 1849, the Vermont Central leased the Vermont and Canada, and it was completed in 1851. However, the Vermont Central defaulted on rental payments, and the Vermont and Canada returned to its original owners on June 28, 1852. The lease was later reinstated.

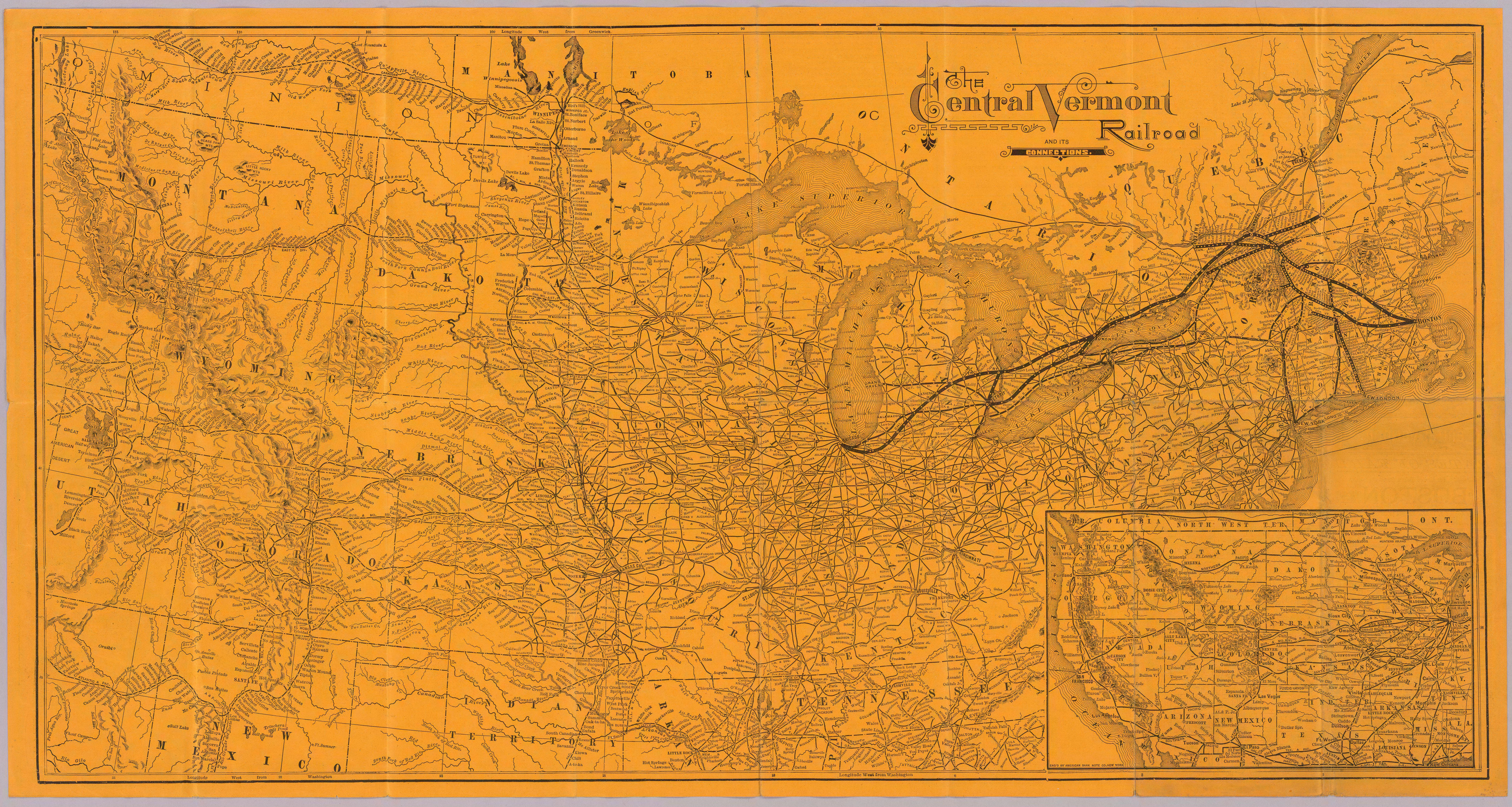
1887 map with connections

The Montreal and Vermont Junction Railway was chartered in 1860 and opened in the 1860s, extending the Vermont and Canada's branch from the international border north to St. Johns, Quebec, on the Grand Trunk Railway's Montreal and Champlain Railroad. From opening, it was operated as an extension of the Vermont and Canada.

The Sullivan County Railroad continued south from Windsor to Bellows Falls, Vermont, where it met the Cheshire Railroad toward Boston. At first it was operated by the Central Vermont, but later the Boston and Maine Railroad gained control of it, giving trackage rights to the Central Vermont. Similarly, the Vermont Valley Railroad, running south from Bellows Falls to the New London Northern Railroad in Brattleboro, was originally owned by the Rutland Railroad and later by the B&M.

In 1867 the Vermont Central leased the Stanstead, Shefford and Chambly Railroad, running east from St. Johns to Waterloo, Quebec. The Waterloo and Magog Railway was later built as an extension from Waterloo south to Magog.

The Vermont Central leased the Ogdensburg and Lake Champlain Railroad on March 1, 1870, extending its line from Rouses Point west to Ogdensburg, New York. On January 1, 1871, the Vermont Central leased the Rutland Railroad system, giving it routes from Burlington to Bellows Falls, Vermont, and Chatham, New York. The New London Northern Railroad was leased on December 1, 1871. On November 2, 1872, the name was changed to the Central Vermont Railroad.

Though the Missisquoi Railroad was chartered as an independent entity in 1867, the Central Vermont RR gained control of it shortly thereafter. It was formally leased in July 1873, providing a branch from St. Albans northeast to Richford, Vermont. It was operated until November 15, 1877, when the Connecticut and Passumpsic Rivers Railroad took it over. The company was reorganized in December 1886 as the Missisquoi Valley Railway, and was once again leased to the Central Vermont.

The Montpelier and White River Railroad opened in 1876 and was leased to the Central Vermont, running from the end of the Montpelier Branch south to and beyond Barre.

The Consolidated Railway was formed on June 30, 1884, to consolidate the 'Central Vermont' and 'Vermont and Canada', and to settle litigation between the two companies. A new Central Vermont Railroad was formed on July 1, 1884 to take over from the Consolidated Railway.

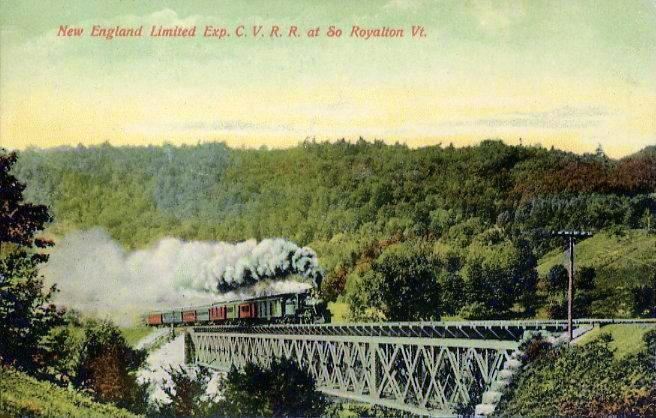
New England Limited Express at South Royalton in 1909

In 1889, the Burlington and Lamoille Railroad was reorganized as the Burlington and Lamoille Valley Railroad and leased by the Central Vermont. This provided a branch from Essex Junction to the Lamoille Valley Railroad at Cambridge Junction in Cambridge, Vermont, and a quickly abandoned redundant line from Essex Junction west to Burlington. This second connection crossed the Winooski River near Essex Junction and connected to the Rutland Railroad at the south end of Burlington near the present-day terminus of I-189.

The Montreal and Province Line Railway was formed in 1896 as a reorganization of the Montreal, Portland and Boston Railroad. Originally planned as a branch of the Portland and Ogdensburg Railroad to Montreal, and operated by the Connecticut and Passumpsic Rivers Railroad, it was taken over by the Central Vermont upon reorganization. The main line ran from the Grand Trunk Railway's Montreal and Champlain Railroad at Saint-Lambert, across the St. Lawrence River from Montreal, southeast to Farnham on the Stanstead, Shefford and Chambly Railroad, with an extension continuing southeast to Frelighsburg. A branch went east from Marieville to St. Cesaire.

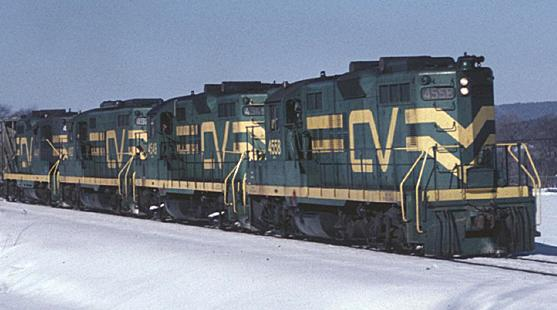
CV locomotives

In 1896, the Central Vermont entered receivership, and the Rutland Railroad was separated. The Grand Trunk Railway bought the bankrupt company on March 20. The Ogdensburg and Lake Champlain Railroad lease ended in 1898, and that company was leased by the Rutland in 1901. The Central Vermont Railroad was sold at foreclosure on March 21, 1899, and was reorganized as the Central Vermont Railway on May 1. During this process, on April 15, 1899, it purchased the Missisquoi Valley Railroad outright.

On July 12, 1920, the entire Grand Trunk system was placed under the control of a "Board of Management" by the federal Department of Railways and Canals in Canada after several years of financial difficulties. After several years of legal battles by Grand Trunk shareholders, intent on preventing the federal government from nationalizing the company, the company was nationalized on January 20, 1923, and fully merged into the Crown corporation Canadian National Railway.

=== CN and NECR: 1923-present ===
On December 12, 1927, in the aftermath of the Great Vermont Flood of 1927, the Central Vermont Railway entered receivership again, and was reorganized January 31, 1930, to form a new company of the same name.

While the Central Vermont was no longer independent, it kept much of its corporate identity and was run as a separate railroad from the rest of the CN system. As the grip of the Great Depression eased, the railroad became a relatively successful arm of the CN network until the postwar period. It moved a wide range of freight from general merchandise and furniture to milk and agricultural products.

During the 1950s, diesels from CN began to appear on the Central Vermont, with the last steam locomotive ending service in 1957. The 1960s were an especially-rough period due to declining traffic, rising costs, and falling revenues.

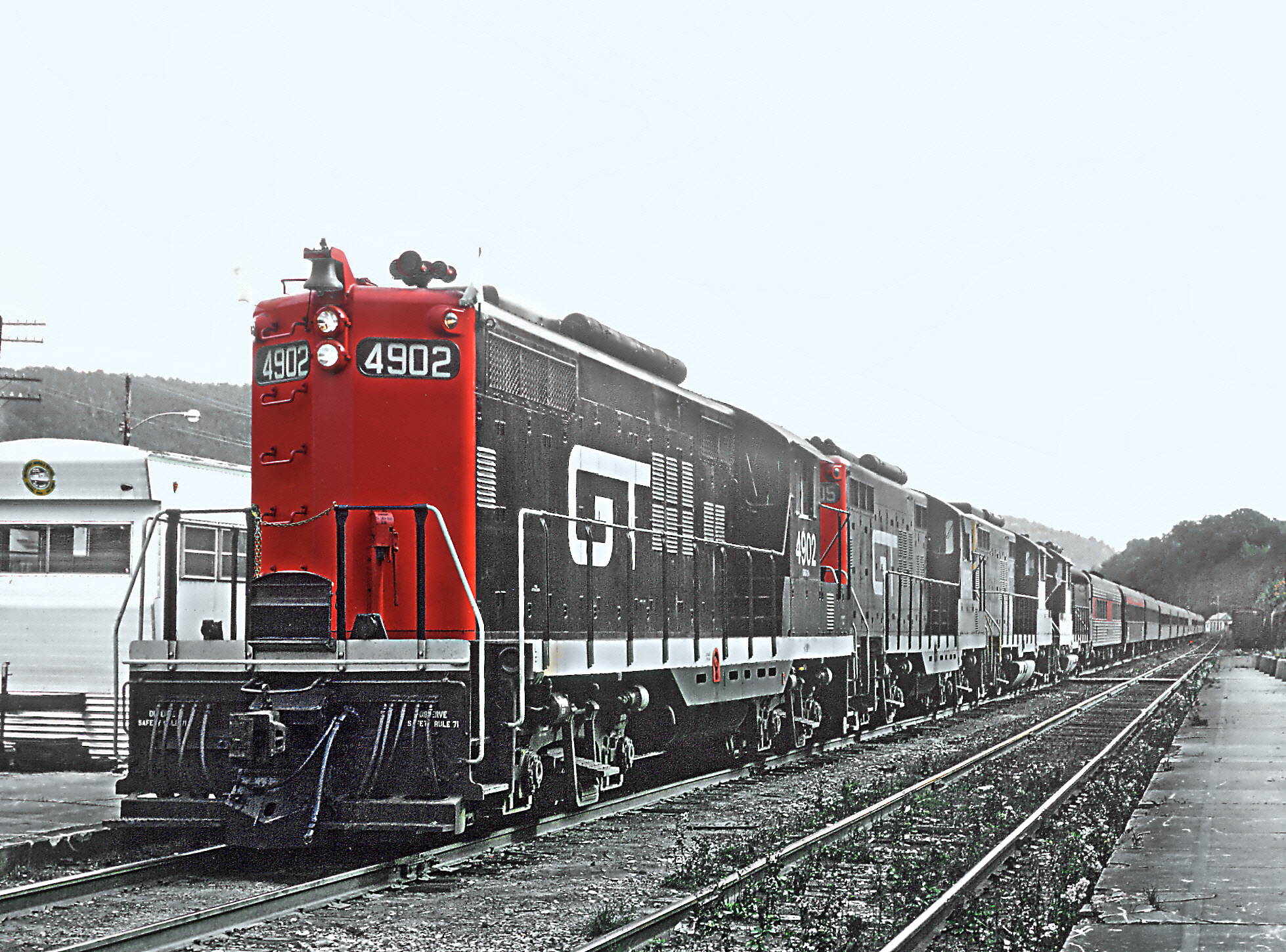
Central Vermont Railway engine in Brattleboro, Vermont in 1968

Under the Grand Trunk and later the Canadian National, the Central Vermont system saw many of its unprofitable branch lines abandoned. The CN continued to operate the CV as a modestly successful system; however, in the process leading up to the privatization of the CN, which took place on November 28, 1995, several non-core routes were identified for sale, one of then being the CV.

On February 3, 1995, the CN sold the CV mainline from New London, Connecticut, to East Alburg, Vermont, to shortline operating company RailTex, which renamed the operation the New England Central Railroad. RailTex was merged into RailAmerica in 2000. Genesee & Wyoming acquired RailAmerica at the end of 2012. Operations have continued as before.

== Divisions and branches ==
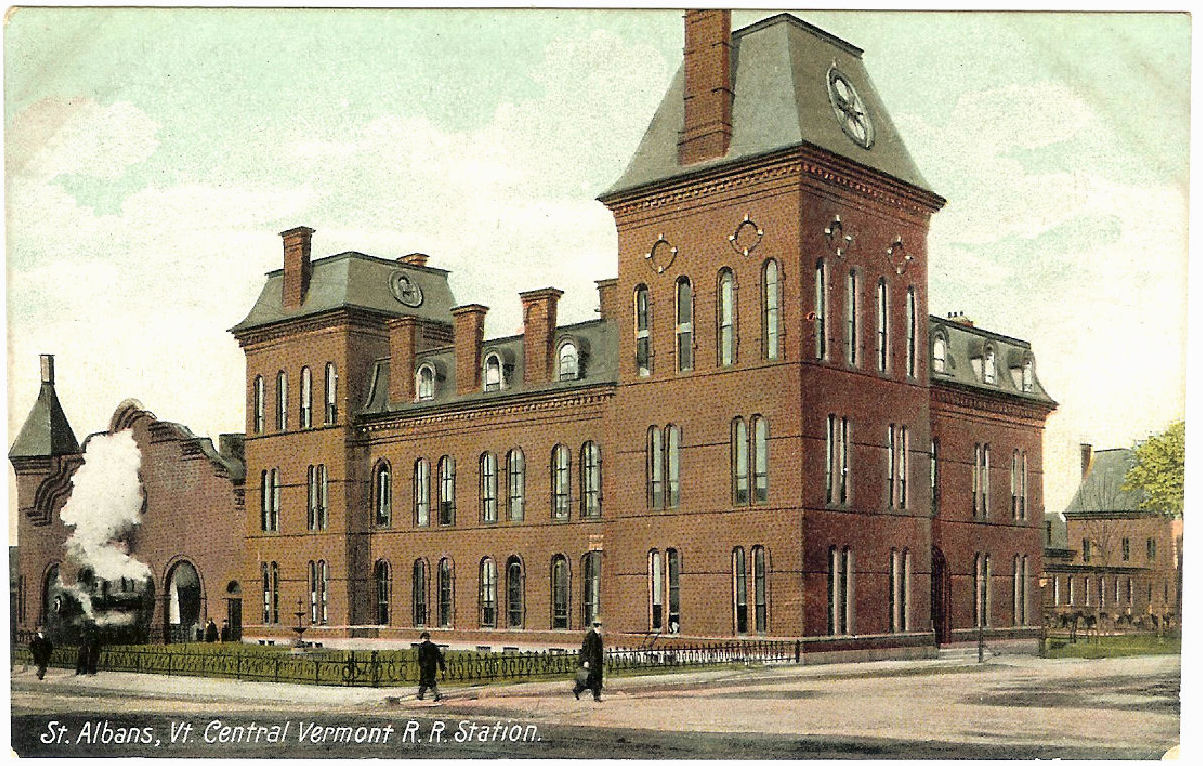
Central Vermont Railway Station in St. Albans

=== Richford Branch ===
This line was formed as the Missisquoi Railroad, then became the Missisquoi Valley Railroad, and then the Missisquoi Valley Division, before gaining its final name. Operations continued on the entire 27.48-mile (44.22 km) length until 1984, when a derailment on the bridge spanning the Missisquoi River near Sheldon, Vermont, forced the dismantlement of one of three spans. Operations continued on the east end, while the Lamoille Valley Railroad operated on the isolated west end of the line to Richford occasionally after 1989. In 1990 the tracks from St. Albans to the bridge were pulled up.

The following stops were made on the branch from west to east:

- Saint Albans, Vermont (interchange with the Central Vermont Railway)
- Green's Corners, Vermont
- Sheldon Springs, Vermont
- Sheldon, Vermont (interchange with the Missisquoi Pulp and Paper Company)
- North Sheldon, Vermont
- Sheldon Junction, Vermont (interchange with the Saint Johnsbury and Lake Champlain Railroad)
- East Frankin, Vermont
- Enosburg Falls, Vermont
- North Enosburg, Vermont
- East Berkshire, Vermont
- Richford, Vermont (interchange with the Canadian Pacific Railway)

== Passenger trains ==
While the CV operated local trains exclusively on its own tracks in its early years, most of its later passenger trains were operated jointly with other railroads such as the Boston and Maine Railroad, the New Haven and the CV's owner, the Canadian National Railway.

- The Montrealer ran on the same route but as an overnight service that extended to Washington, DC. The service began on June 15, 1924 but ended on September 6, 1966. Its southbound run was named the Washingtonian.
- The Ambassador ran between New York City, Springfield, White River Junction and Montreal on a day-time schedule from 1926 until September 3, 1966. It had a section to Boston until 1956.
- The New Englander also began in 1926, connecting Boston with Montreal overnight. In its later years, the train combined with the B&M's Red Wing in White River Junction and operated as a section of the Montrealer from Montreal to White River Junction. It was discontinued sometime after 1953.
- The Vermonter ran between St. Albans and White River Junction from around 1940 until November 5, 1965. The train left St. Albans in the evening and arrived in White River Junction around midnight or later. Sleeper cars were transferred to the Montrealer for service to New York City. Northbound trains left White River Junction in the middle of the night to arrive in St. Albans early in the morning. This service lends its name to the modern incarnation of the Vermonter.

Until 1947, the CV operated local trains between Brattleboro and New London using a Brill self-propelled car for one daily round-trip and steam-powered mixed train. After the late 1930's, the CV operated two local trains between White River Junction to St. Albans. Like the New London service, a Brill car operated one round-trip while a steam engine operated the other train. After the CV shifted its trains from East Alburgh to Canadian National's track in Cantic, the Brill cars operated a local service from St. Albans to St. Jean and after 1949, this service ran to Montreal Central Station until its 1953 termination. The CV also operated a local service between White River Junction and Springfield for several months per year with the Boston and Maine Railroad operating the service for the remaining months as mileage-equalization exercise.

The demise of the Montrealer ended all passenger service on the CV. However on September 30, 1972, Amtrak restored the Montrealer as a result of a federal mandate to resume train service to Canada, returning passenger service to CV tracks between the Canadian border and Windsor, VT. In 1989, the Montrealer was rerouted to the CV’s main line which had not seen passenger trains operate between Northfield, MA and New London, CT since 1947. The previous route along the Connecticut River had deteriorated due to lack of maintenance. In 1995, the overnight Montrealer was replaced with day-time Vermonter, reusing the name of a previous CV-operated train, and the service was rerouted to the Hartford Line, with the train reversing in Palmer to access the CV main line. In 2014, the Connecticut River Line was rebuilt and reopened to passenger trains and passenger service was dropped from the now former CV track in Massachusetts.
