= Holyoke station =

Train station in Massachusetts, U.S.

Holyoke, MA
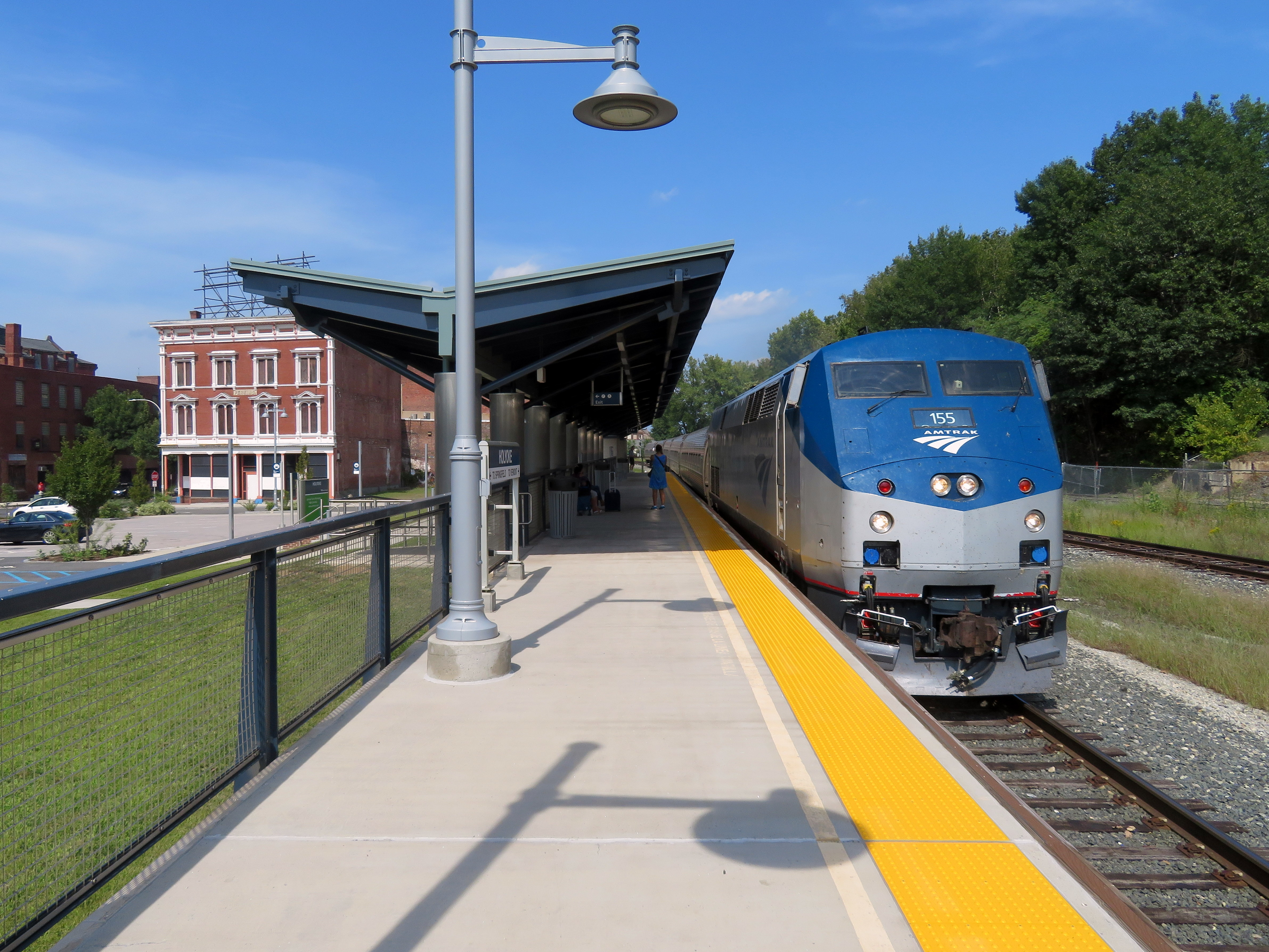
- The southbound Vermonter at Holyoke in August 2018

General information
- Location: 74 Main Street; Holyoke, Massachusetts; United States
- Coordinates: 42.20405°N 72.60236°W
- Owner: City of Holyoke
- Line: Connecticut River Line
- Platforms: 1 side platform
- Tracks: 1
- Train operators: Amtrak
- Connections: PVTA: G19, R29

Construction
- Parking: 25 spaces
- Cycle facilities: Racks
- Accessible: Yes
- Architect: Michael Baker International

Other information
- Station code: Amtrak: HLK

History
- Opened: 1845 (original station); August 27, 2015 (new platform)
- Closed: 1966
- Rebuilt: 1885

Passengers
- FY 2025: 2,698 (Amtrak)

Services
Preceding station	Amtrak	Following station
Springfield toward New Haven	Valley Flyer	Northampton toward Greenfield
Springfield toward Washington, D.C.	Vermonter	Northampton toward St. Albans
Location

Holyoke station is an Amtrak intercity train station near the corner of Main and Dwight streets in Holyoke, Massachusetts, United States. The station opened on August 27, 2015, eight months after Amtrak's Vermonter service was re-routed to the Connecticut River Line through the Pioneer Valley.

The first railroad station in Holyoke had opened in 1845, followed by the H.H. Richardson-designed Connecticut River Railroad Station in 1885. Though passenger service to Holyoke ended in 1966, the 1885 depot is still extant. The opening of the new station restored passenger rail service to Holyoke for the first time in 49 years, and to the Dwight and Main streets site for the first time in 130 years. A pilot program added two daily Amtrak Shuttle round trips in August 2019 under the Valley Flyer moniker.

== History ==
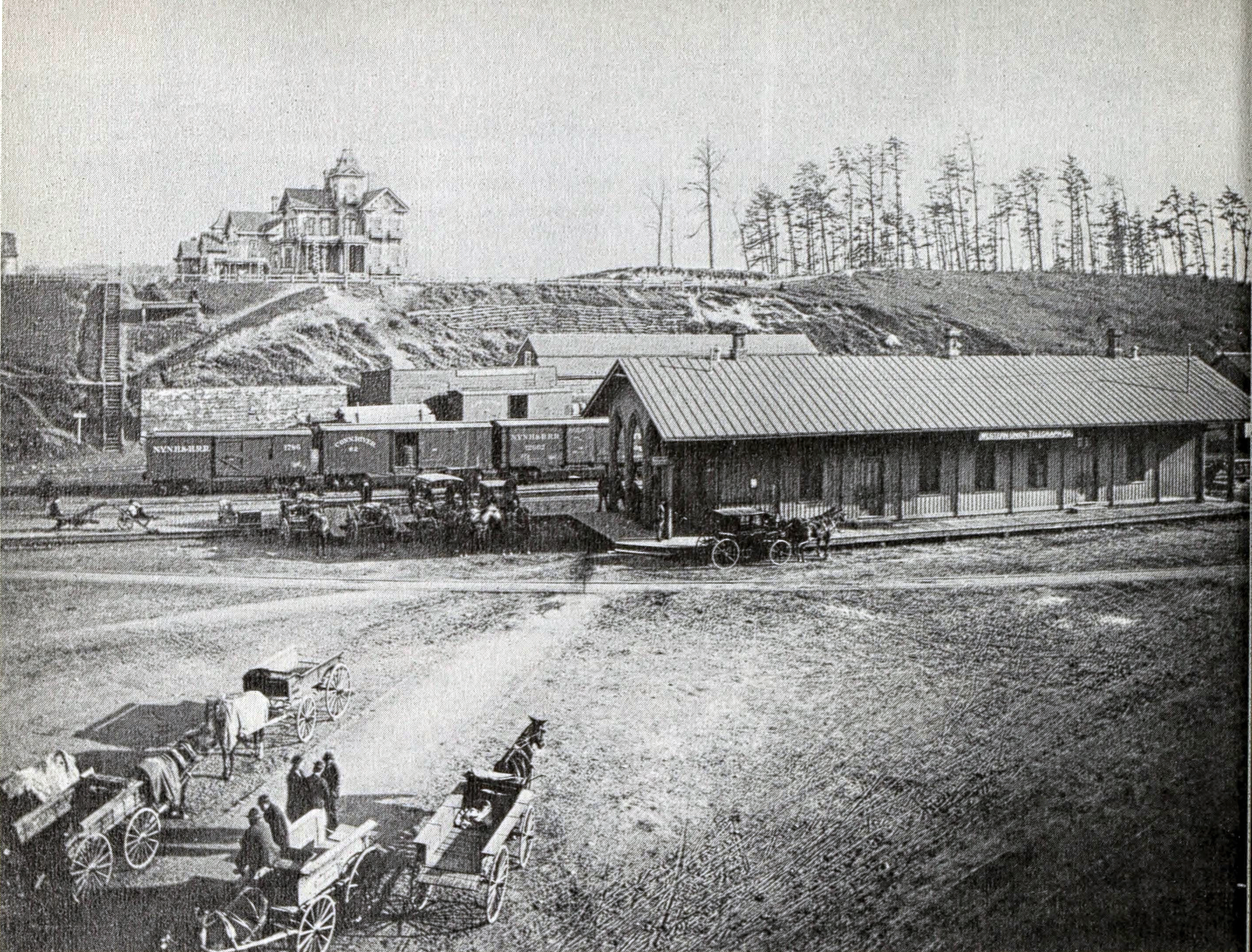
The original depot, c. 1880

The Connecticut River Railroad opened to passenger service between Springfield and Northampton in late 1845; trains reached Deerfield in August 1846, Greenfield in December 1847, and the junction with the Central Vermont Railway in January 1849. When the Vermont and Massachusetts Railroad reached Brattleboro in 1850, the Connecticut River Railroad began running through service from Springfield to Brattleboro. Over the next century, the line was host to a mix of local and long-distance passenger and freight service. It became part of the route for numerous New York-Montreal trains as early as the 1860s, and was acquired by the Boston and Maine Railroad in 1893.

Holyoke's original train depot, which was located near Dwight and Main Streets, was a modest wooden structure that served both passenger and freight needs. The site of the original depot is today occupied by an automobile repair shop and dealership.

=== Connecticut River Railroad station ===
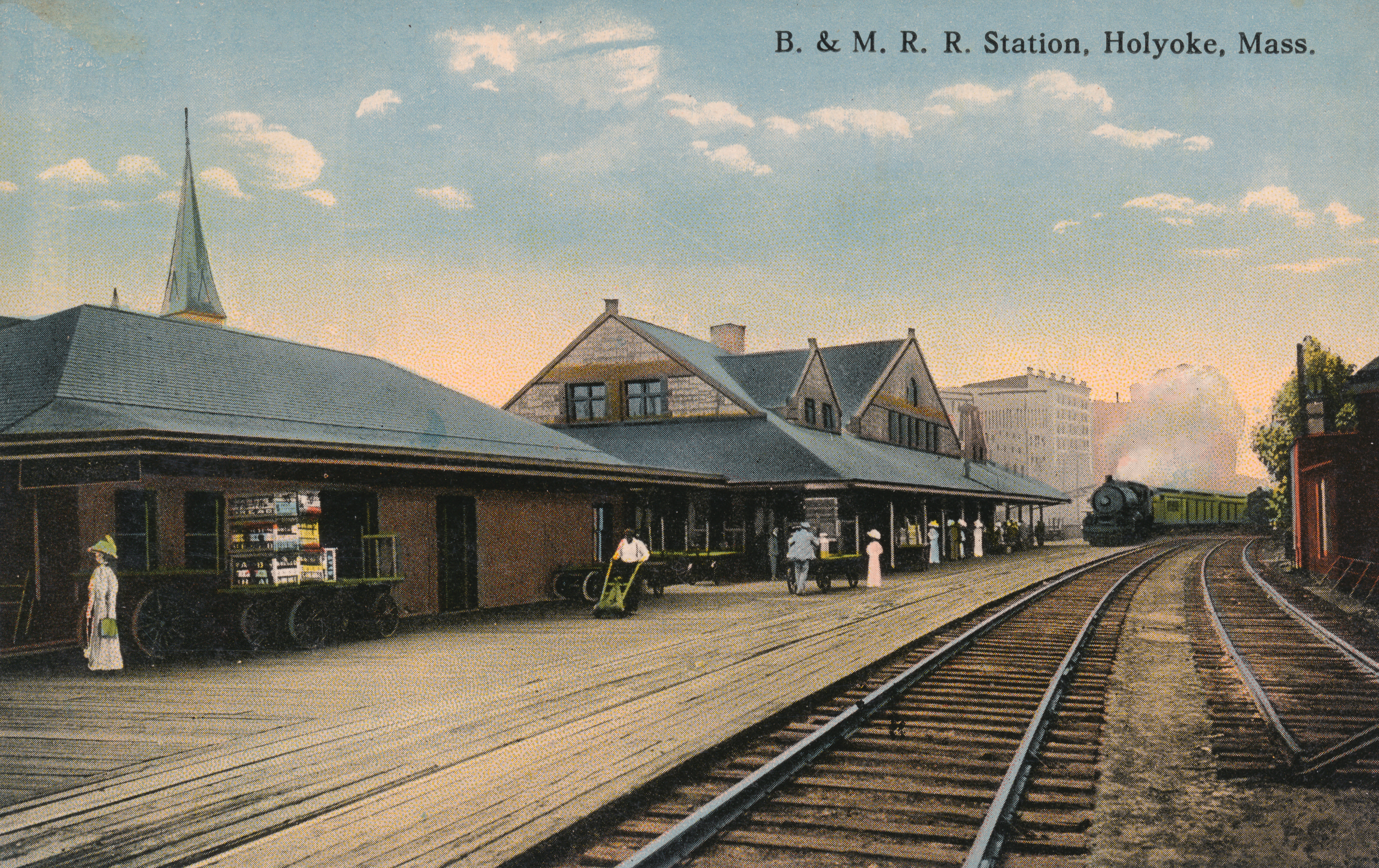
The former station, c. 1904

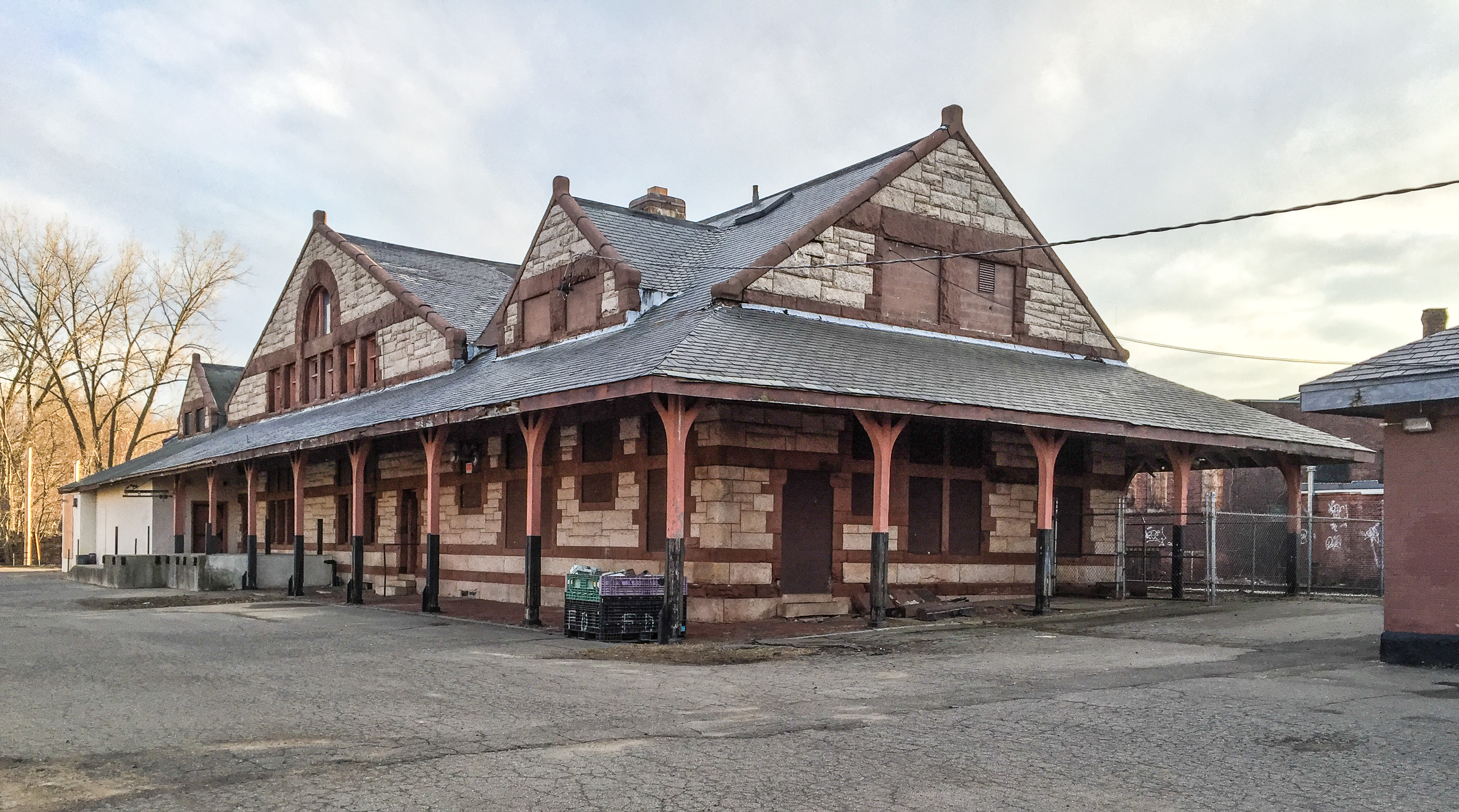
The former station in disrepair in 2016

The Connecticut River Railroad Station was built in Holyoke in 1884-5 for the Connecticut River Railroad. Designed by the American architect Henry Hobson Richardson, it was one of the last in his series of Northeastern railroad stations. The station building, which is rectangular in shape, was originally designed with a double-height waiting room lit by high dormers. The building, which was constructed with granite and brownstone, included a slate covered hipped roof with multiple dormers.

In 1965, with passenger service waning, the station was converted into a mechanical shop by Perry's Auto Parts. Long-distance service over the line ended in October 1966, with local service between Springfield and Brattleboro lasting several more months.

In 1972, Amtrak began running the Montrealer, which ran along the line at night, stopping at Northampton but not Holyoke or Greenfield. The Montrealer was discontinued in 1987 due to poor track conditions on the line. Service resumed in 1989 after Amtrak seized control of the line in Vermont from the Boston and Maine Railroad, but the train was rerouted over the Central Vermont Railway through Massachusetts and Connecticut to avoid the still-dilapidated Connecticut River Line which Amtrak did not control. A stop was added at Amherst to replace Northampton. The Montrealer was replaced by the daytime Vermonter in 1995, using the original route through Connecticut but still avoiding the Connecticut River Line in Massachusetts.

In 2004 the structure (along with Richardson's house in Brookline, Massachusetts) was cited as one of the ten most endangered historic sites in Massachusetts. In May 2009, as the building sat littered with graffiti and falling into disrepair, it was purchased from a private owner by the City of Holyoke's Gas & Electric department. Plans to repair the building did not at the time include allowing its use as a rail depot. In August 2014 the Holyoke Office of Planning & Economic Development issued a report detailing a number of potential new uses for the former Connecticut River Railroad station building. Proposed potential uses were divided into four broad themes: Food Uses, Collaborative Workspaces & Commercial Uses, Community & Cultural Uses and Academic Engagement & Educational Uses. On November 10, 2019, the station was sold to a private party for $10,000; no preservation plan was announced at that time.

=== Restoration of passenger service ===
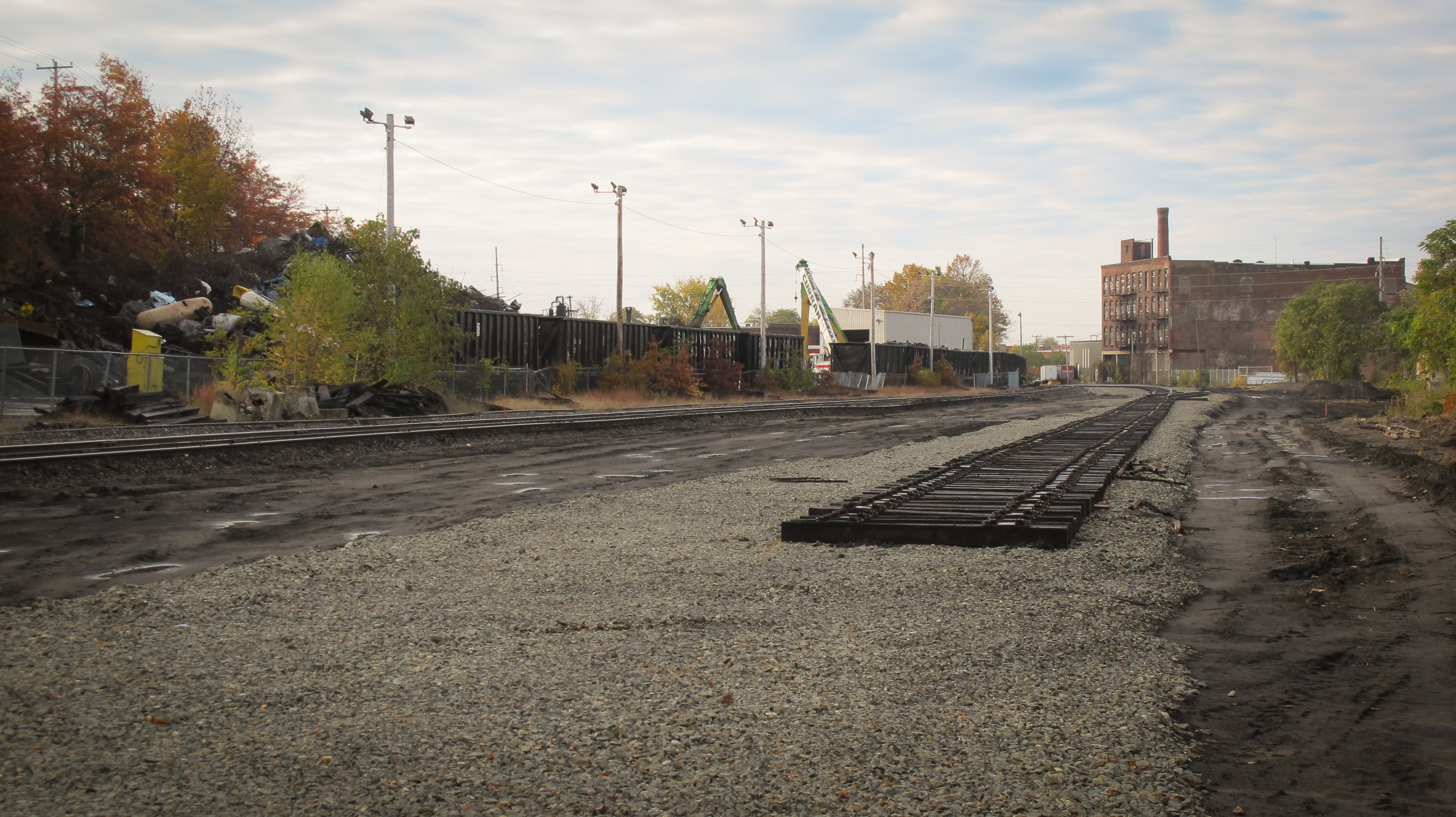
Track work at the new station site in October 2014

In order to shorten travel times on the Vermonter and add additional local service to serve the populated Connecticut River Valley, the Pan Am Railways Connecticut River Line was rebuilt with $73 million in federal money and $10 million in state funds. The Vermonter was rerouted to the line on December 29, 2014, with new station stops in Northampton and Greenfield.

A stop at Holyoke was originally planned to open with Northampton and Greenfield but later delayed. The city considered reactivating the former station building, but instead decided that a site at Dwight Street a block west provided a better place for a modern station design. The new Depot Square Railroad Station, which cost approximately $3.2 million, includes a 400-foot (120 m)-long high level platform, 170-foot-long canopy, and a waiting area and staircase facing Dwight Street. The station has a 25-space parking lot and loop for bus drop off and is fully handicapped accessible. The city first planned a one-car-length "mini-high" platform with a longer stretch of low platform, but changed to the longer high-level platform in 2014. The construction of the new station was funded by a $2 million MassWorks Infrastructure grant from the Commonwealth of Massachusetts.

Construction for the station began in November 2014, and a formal groundbreaking was held on December 22, 2014, one week before the Vermonter was rerouted to the line. The station was then intended to open in April 2015, but construction took longer than expected. Depot Square Railroad Station opened on August 27, 2015. On August 30, 2019, Amtrak extended two daily New Haven–Springfield Shuttle round trips (branded as the Valley Flyer) to Greenfield as a pilot program.
