= John W. Olver Transit Center =

Intermodal transit hub in Franklin County, Massachusetts

John W. Olver Transit Center Greenfield, MA
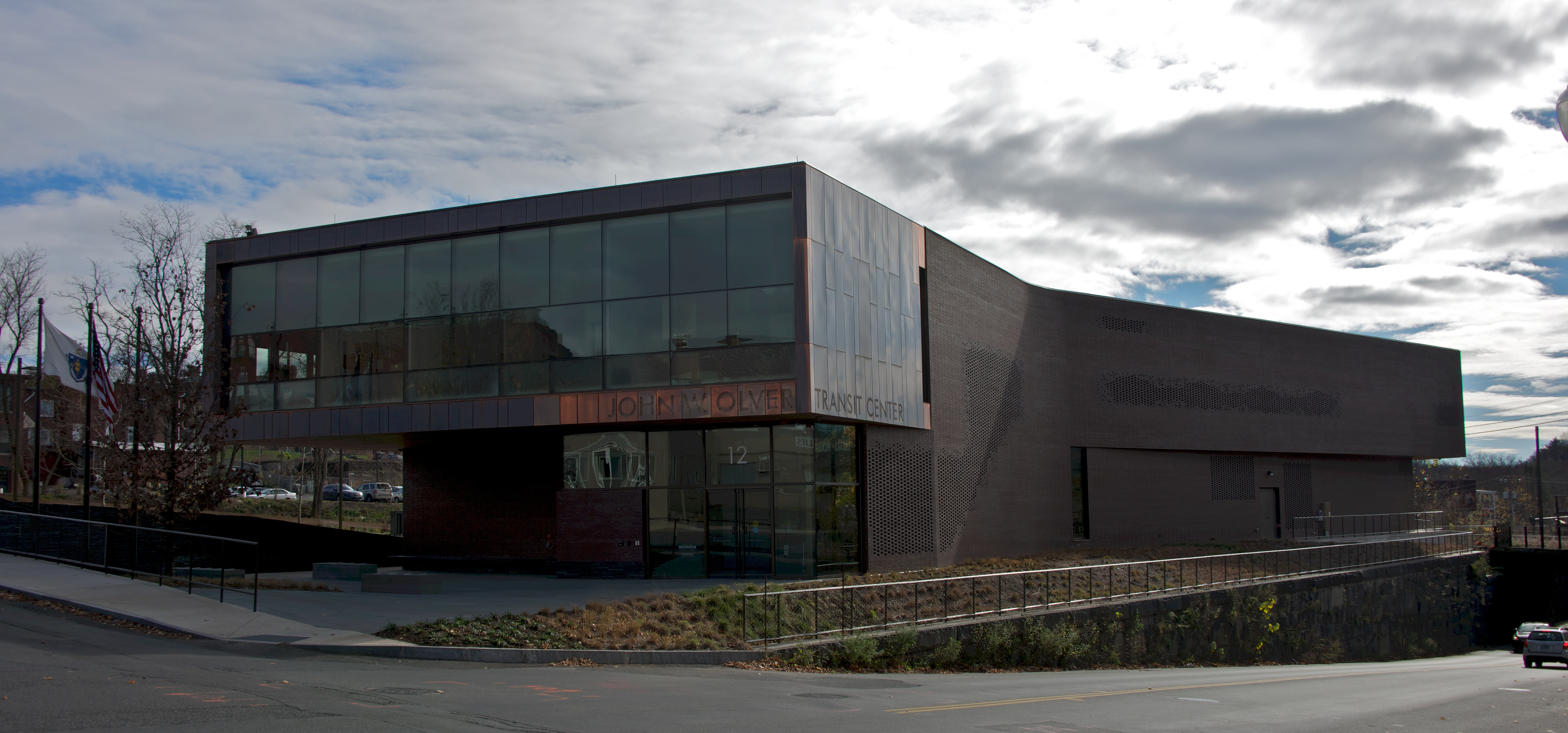
- View of Olver Transit Center from Olive Street

General information
- Location: 12 Olive Street; Greenfield, Massachusetts; United States
- Coordinates: 42°35′09″N 72°36′02″W
- Owner: Franklin Regional Transit Authority
- Line: Connecticut River Line
- Platforms: 1
- Tracks: 2
- Train operators: Amtrak
- Bus stands: 5
- Connections: FRTA: 20, 21, 23, 24, 31, 32, 41; PVTA: PG; Greyhound

Construction
- Parking: 39 short-term spaces
- Cycle facilities: 16 bike rack spaces
- Accessible: Yes
- Architect: Charles Rose Architects

Other information
- Station code: Amtrak: GFD

History
- Opened: May 7, 2012; Rail service: December 29, 2014

Passengers
- FY 2025: 13,291 (Amtrak)

Services
Preceding station	Amtrak	Following station
Northampton toward New Haven	Valley Flyer	Terminus
Northampton toward Washington, D.C.	Vermonter	Brattleboro toward St. Albans
Former services
Preceding station	Boston and Maine Railroad	Following station
West Deerfield toward Troy	Boston – Troy	East Deerfield toward Boston
Deerfield toward Springfield	Springfield – White River Junction	Bernardston toward White River Junction
Location

The John W. Olver Transit Center, also called the JWO Transit Center, is an intermodal transit hub for Franklin County, Massachusetts. Located in Greenfield, it currently serves Franklin Regional Transit Authority (FRTA) local bus routes plus intercity bus service. Amtrak's Greenfield station is also located here, with one daily Vermonter round trip and two daily Valley Flyer round trips, which are extensions of Amtrak-run Hartford Line trains.

Named after long-time western Massachusetts congressman John Olver, the hub is the first zero net energy transit center in the United States. Built with American Recovery and Reinvestment Act funds, the facility was constructed with solar panels, geothermal wells, copper heat screens and other energy efficient technologies. It houses the FRTA offices and the Franklin Regional Council of Governments, the successor organization to the Franklin County county government.

== Amenities ==
Passenger amenities available at the JWO Transit Center are an indoor waiting area, rest rooms, public WiFi service and bicycle racks. Short-term parking is available for a limited number of vehicles and long-term parking is available one block away at the city lot located on Hope Street.

== Services ==
=== Local and regional bus services ===
All FRTA fixed route bus routes connect at JWO Transit Center.

- Route 20: Green Link Connector
- Route 21: Greenfield Community
- Route 23: Amherst/Greenfield
- Route 24: Crosstown Connector
- Route 31: Northampton/Greenfield
- Route 32: Orange/Greenfield
- Route 41: Charlemont/Greenfield

=== Intercity bus service ===
The PVTA runs the PG (Pelham-Greenfield), a minibus service from Pelham through Amherst that runs through the Olver Transit Center, terminating at the Baystate Franklin Medical Center. Greyhound offer limited bus service from the Olver Transit Center; Greyhound provides a single round trip per day from Brattleboro and White River Junction to Springfield and New York City via Greenfield. The station is also served by Link 413 route 903.

=== Amtrak ===
Amtrak's north–south Vermonter service stops daily in the afternoon along with two roundtrip Valley Flyer trains in the morning and night hours. The Amtrak boarding platform, which is handicapped accessible, is located behind the transit center building. A waiting area is available inside the building for passengers, but Amtrak tickets are not available for purchase at the JWO Transit Center.

== Railroad history ==
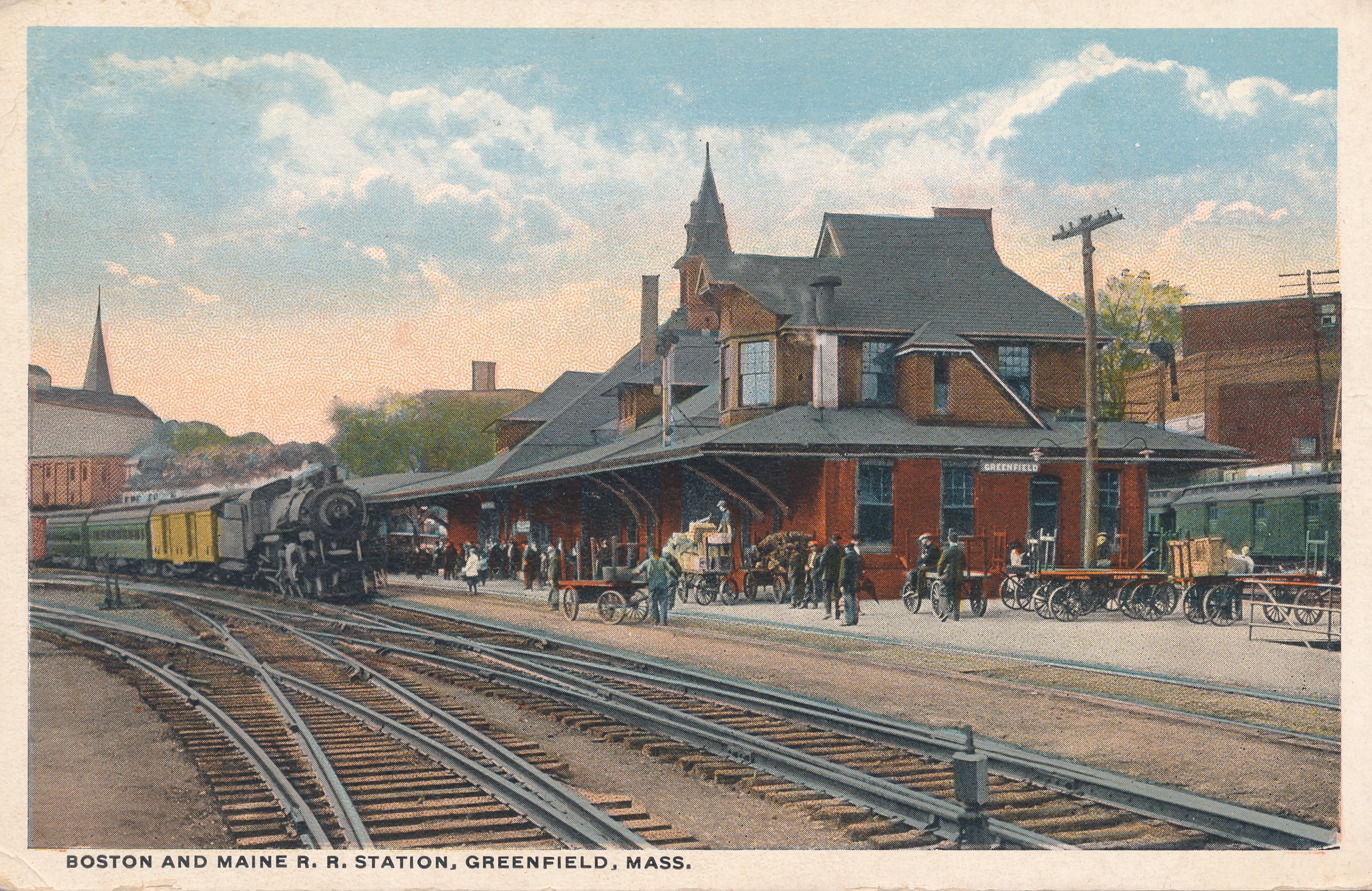
The Boston and Maine Railroad station in Greenfield around 1916

The Connecticut River Railroad (CRRR) opened to passenger service between Springfield and Northampton in late 1845; trains reached Deerfield in August 1846, Greenfield in December 1847, and the junction with the Central Vermont Railway in January 1849. When the Vermont and Massachusetts Railroad reached Brattleboro in 1850, the Connecticut River Railroad began running through service from Springfield to Brattleboro. Service east from Greenfield to Boston was started by the Vermont and Massachusetts Railroad in 1851, and was extended west to Troy, New York through the Hoosac Tunnel in 1875.

The CRRR was host to a mix of local and long-distance passenger and freight service. It became part of the route for crack New York-Montreal trains as early as the 1860s, and was acquired by the Boston and Maine Railroad in 1893. The Fitchburg Railroad was similarly acquired six years later. Under the Boston and Maine, Greenfield was an important local rail hub for the next century.

The former Boston and Maine passenger station was situated on the east side of the Connecticut River Line tracks slightly north of the JWO Transit Center. The station was torn down in April 1966 after many years of being abandoned and due to neglect. The town council voted to tear down the station due to the threat to public safety. The former lot was vacant for many years at the end of Miles Street until the Greenfield Energy Park was opened.

Service between Greenfield and Troy was discontinued in 1958, and all service east to Boston ended in 1960. Long-distance passenger service over the Connecticut River Line ended on September 6, 1966 with the discontinuing of the Pennsylvania Railroad and New Haven's earlier version of the Montrealer. Local service between Springfield and Brattleboro lasting until the end of the year. The Boston and Maine then maintained a Greenfield-Springfield shuttle, then connecting with New Haven RR trains bound for New York City. The Greenfield-Springfield shuttle would also be terminated before the end of 1967. In 1972, Amtrak began running the Montrealer, which ran along the line at night, stopping at Northampton but not Holyoke or Greenfield. The Montrealer was discontinued in 1987 due to poor track conditions on the line.

Service resumed in 1989 after Amtrak seized control of the line in Vermont from the Boston and Maine Railroad, but the train was rerouted over the Central Vermont Railway through Massachusetts and Connecticut to avoid the still-dilapidated Connecticut River Line which Amtrak did not control. A stop was added at Amherst to replace Northampton. The Montrealer was replaced by the daytime Vermonter in 1995, using the original route through Connecticut but still avoiding the Connecticut River Line in Massachusetts.

=== Restoration of service ===
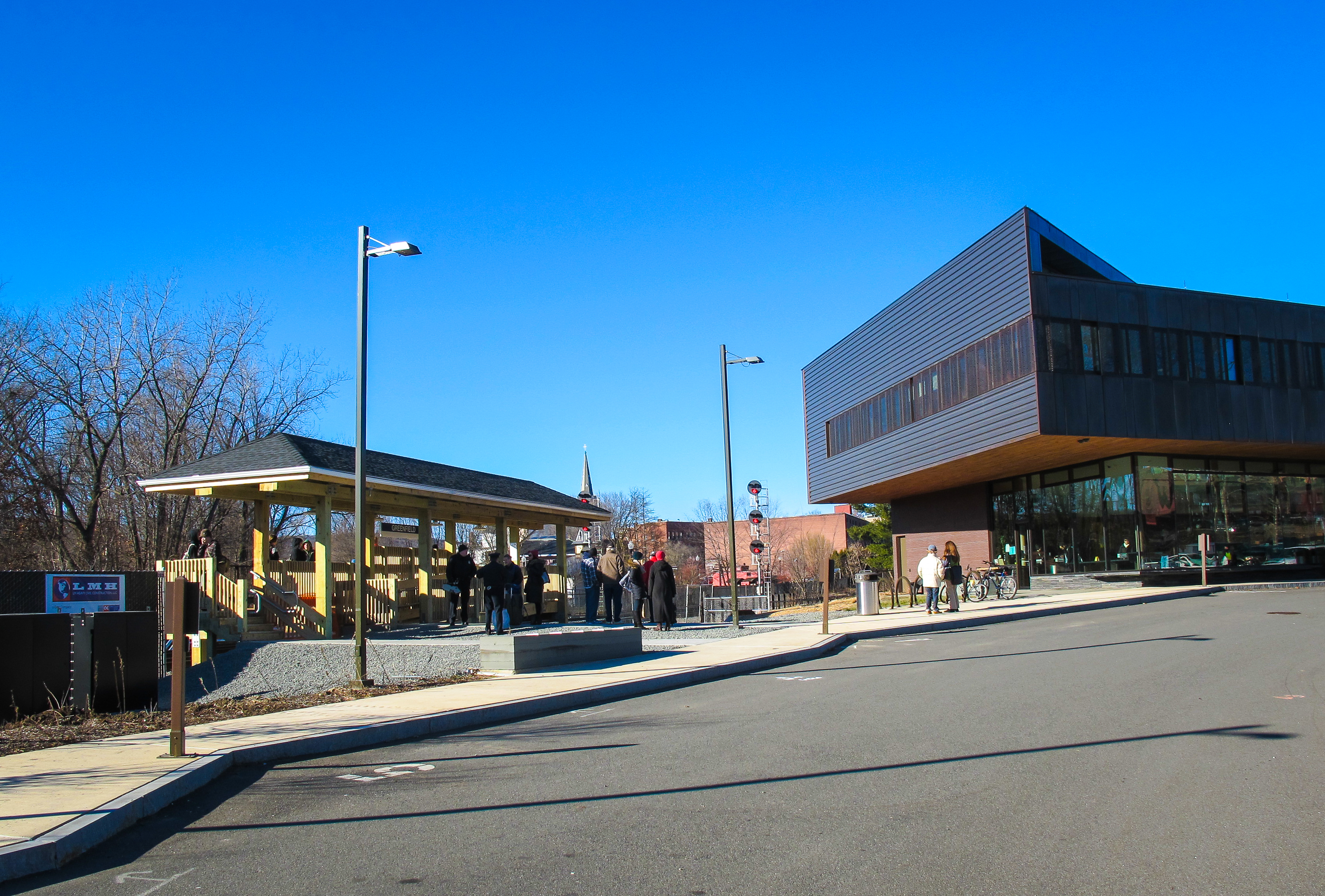
Passengers waiting for the arrival of Amtrak's Vermonter

In order to shorten travel times on the Vermonter and add additional local service to serve the populated Connecticut River Valley, the Connecticut River Line was rebuilt with $73 million in federal American Recovery and Reinvestment Act money and $10 million in state funds.

Construction of an accessible station platform at the Olver Transit Center was to have begun in early 2014 and been largely finished when passenger service began; however, construction was delayed. A temporary accessible wooden platform was completed for the start of Vermonter service on December 29, 2014.

On August 30, 2019, Amtrak extended two daily Hartford Line round trips (branded as Valley Flyer) to Greenfield as a pilot program. In 2022 the Valley Flyer was made a permanent addition to the daily Vermonter service, enabling some commuting by rail and same-day round trips.
