= Union Station (Northampton, Massachusetts) =

Railway station in Northampton, Massachusetts

Northampton, MA
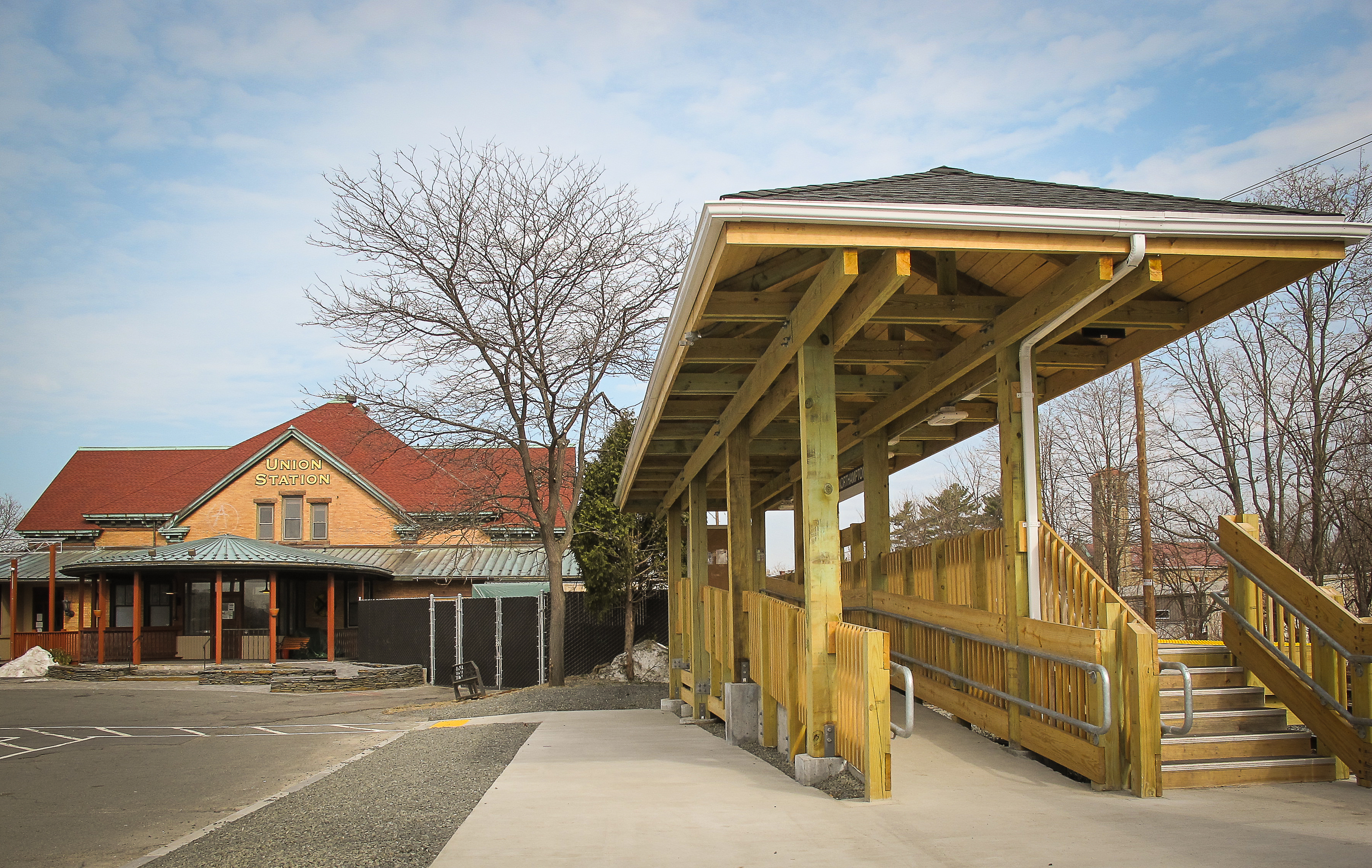
- The historic Union Station building and current station platform

General information
- Location: 125A Pleasant Street; Northampton, Massachusetts; United States
- Coordinates: 42°19′8.3″N 72°37′36.3″W
- Owner: MassDOT (current station); Harmonic Rock Realty LLC (original building)
- Line: Connecticut River Line
- Platforms: 1 side platform
- Tracks: 1
- Train operators: Amtrak
- Connections: Pioneer Valley Transit Authority: 39E, B43, B48, G73E, R41, R42, R44; Link 413: 904

Construction
- Parking: Short-term parking
- Cycle facilities: Bike share (ValleyBike Share), Mass Central Rail Trail, Northampton Rail Trail System
- Accessible: Yes

Other information
- Station code: Amtrak: NHT
- Website: www.amtrak.com/stations/nht

History
- Opened: 1897 (original station); December 29, 2014 (new platform)

Passengers
- FY 2025: 38,907 (Amtrak)

Services
Preceding station	Amtrak	Following station
Holyoke toward New Haven	Valley Flyer	Greenfield Terminus
Holyoke toward Washington, D.C.	Vermonter	Greenfield toward St. Albans
Former services
Preceding station	Amtrak	Following station
Springfield toward Washington, D.C.	Montrealer 1972–1987	Brattleboro toward Montreal
Preceding station	Boston and Maine Railroad	Following station
Terminus	Central Mass Branch	Hadley toward Boston
Mount Tom toward Springfield	Springfield – White River Junction	Hatfield toward White River Junction
Preceding station	New York, New Haven and Hartford Railroad	Following station
Easthampton toward New Haven	Canal Line	Whately toward Shelburne Falls
Florence toward Williamsburgh	Williamsburgh Branch	Terminus
Location

Union Station is a historic building in Northampton, Massachusetts, that served as a train station from 1897 until 1987. Built at the close of the nineteenth century, the structure incorporates many features of the Richardsonian Romanesque architectural style. The buff brick masses of the station are trimmed with red Longmeadow brownstone and hooded by red tile roofs. Steep dormers protrude from the roofline. The interior once featured Italian marble floors, oak woodwork, and a large fireplace.

The building, which is privately owned, was converted in 2013 into a 200-seat banquet facility, a sports bar, and an underground venue known as the Tunnel Bar.

In 2014, passenger rail service at this location was restored when Amtrak's Vermonter began stopping at a new passenger rail boarding platform located just to the south of the Union Station building. In 2019 Amtrak added additional service, with two daily round trips of the Valley Flyer.

== Railway history ==
=== Former service ===
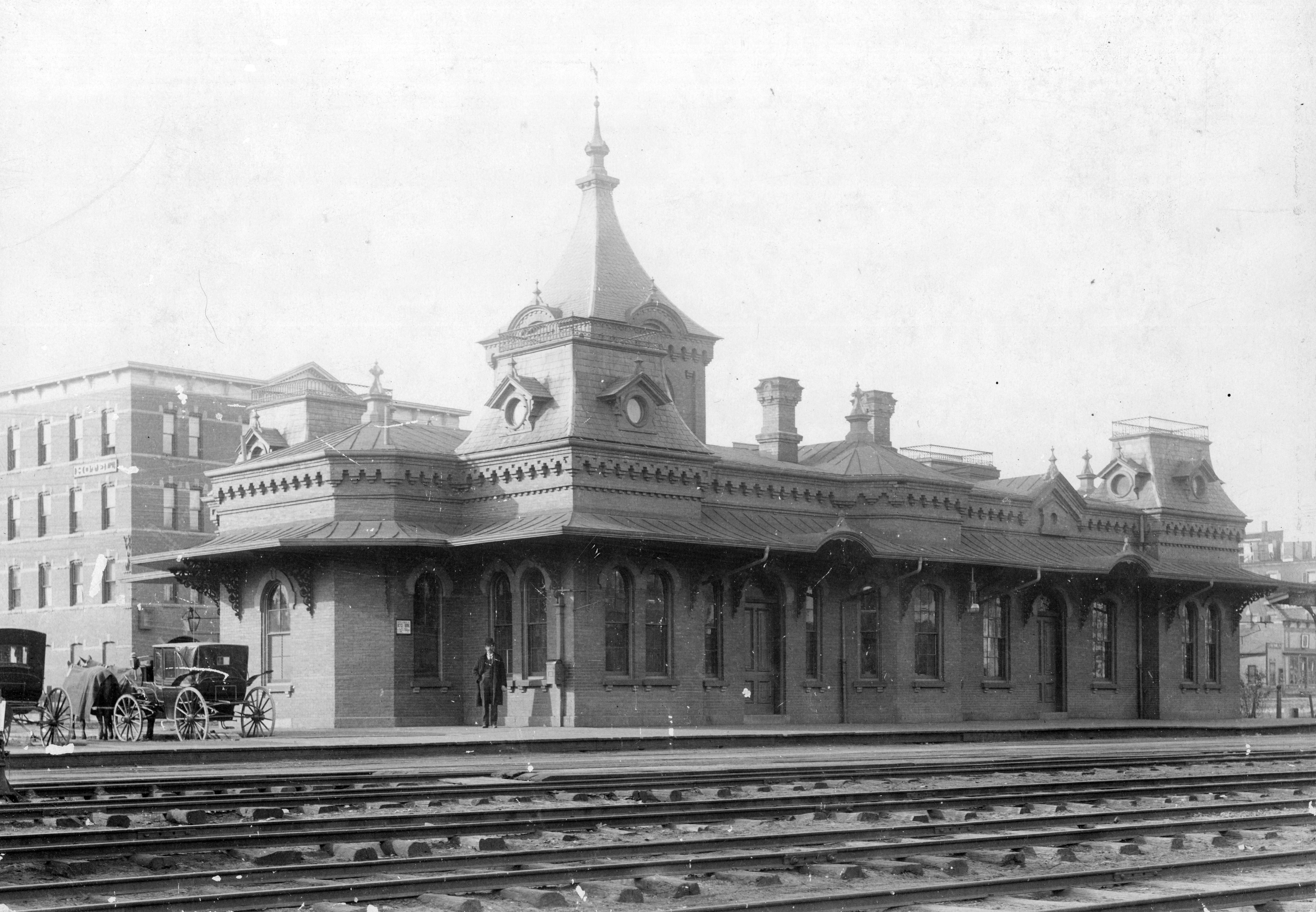
The former Connecticut River Railroad depot, ca. 1880s

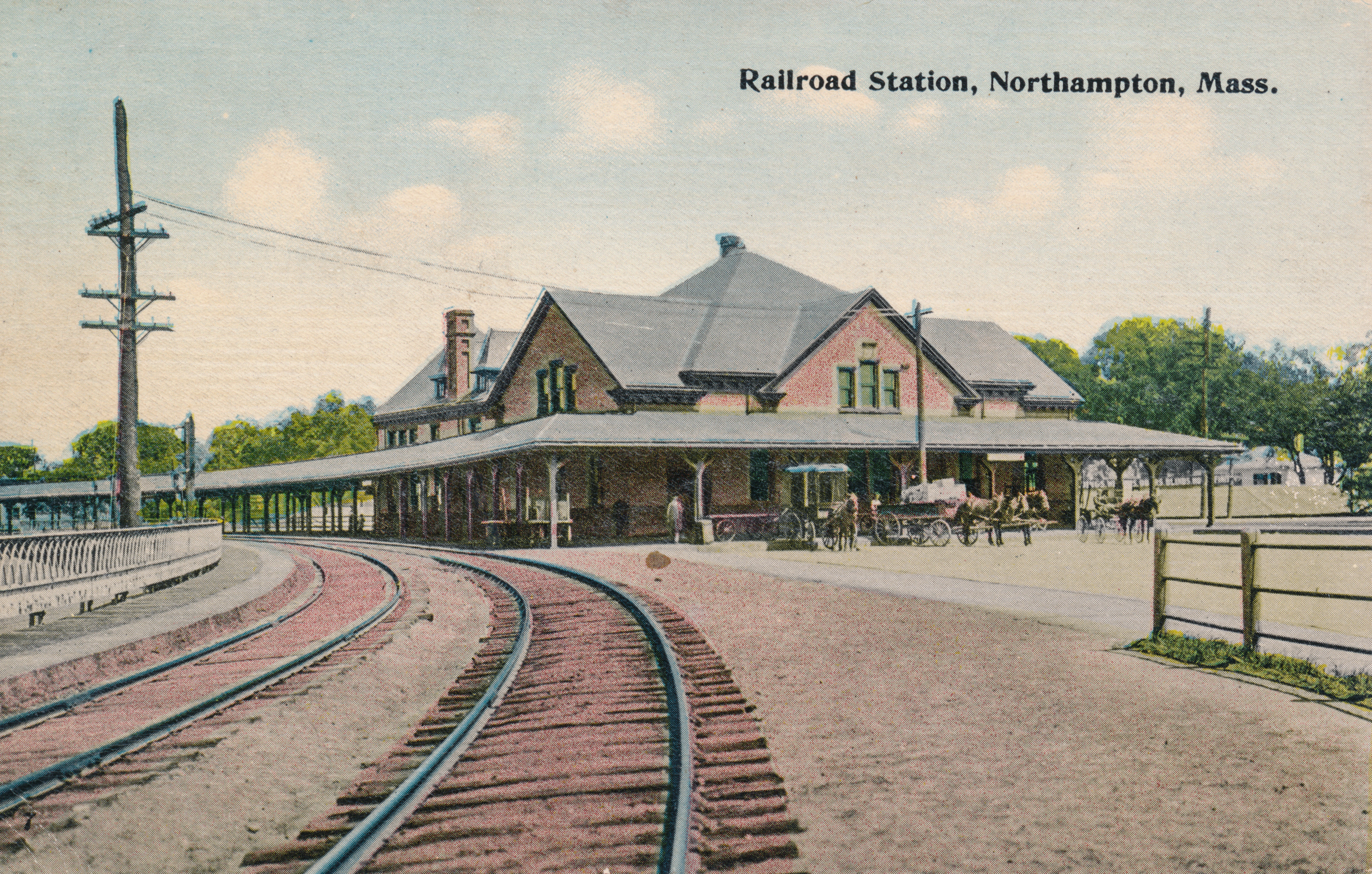
Union Station, ca. 1900

The Connecticut River Railroad opened to passenger service between Springfield and Northampton in late 1845; trains reached Deerfield in August 1846, Greenfield in December 1847, and the junction with the Central Vermont Railway in January 1849. When the Vermont and Massachusetts Railroad reached Brattleboro in 1850, the Connecticut River Railroad began running through service from Springfield to Brattleboro. Over the next century, the line was host to a mix of local and long-distance passenger and freight service. It became part of the route for numerous New York-Montreal trains as early as the 1860s, and was acquired by the Boston and Maine Railroad in 1893. Northampton's Union Station was built in 1896-97 during a project to eliminate grade crossings through downtown Northampton. The station unified two separate stations, serving the Connecticut River mainline, the Central Massachusetts Railroad, the New Haven and Northampton Railroad, and the NH&N's Williamstown Branch. The station opened on Sunday morning December 5, 1897, in time for the departure of the 9:25 a.m. train for Springfield. It was reported that upwards of 2,000 people visited the station on its opening day.

The station was heavily damaged by fire in the early morning hours of October 31, 1928. The fire, which was visible for miles up and down the valley, is said to have attracted a large crowd of late Halloween revelers. Service quickly resumed and the station was rebuilt.

Long-distance passenger service over the line ended in October 1966, with local service between Springfield and Brattleboro lasting several more months. In 1972, Amtrak began running the Montrealer, which ran along the line at night, stopping at Northampton but not Holyoke or Greenfield. The Montrealer was discontinued in 1987 due to poor track conditions on the line.

Montrealer service resumed in 1989 after Amtrak seized control of the line in Vermont from the Boston and Maine Railroad, but the train was rerouted over the Central Vermont Railway through Massachusetts and Connecticut to avoid the still-dilapidated Conn River Line which Amtrak did not control. A stop was added at Amherst to replace Northampton. The Montrealer was replaced by the daytime Vermonter in 1995, using the original route through Connecticut but still avoiding the Connecticut River Line in Massachusetts.

The former station building, associated 200-space parking lot, and the Tunnel Bar that operates under the building in the under-track passage, were purchased by the business entities Harmonic Rock LLC and Notch 8 Inc. in 2013 for $2.55 million. The current owners renovated it into a 200-seat banquet facility and a bar.

=== Restoration of service ===
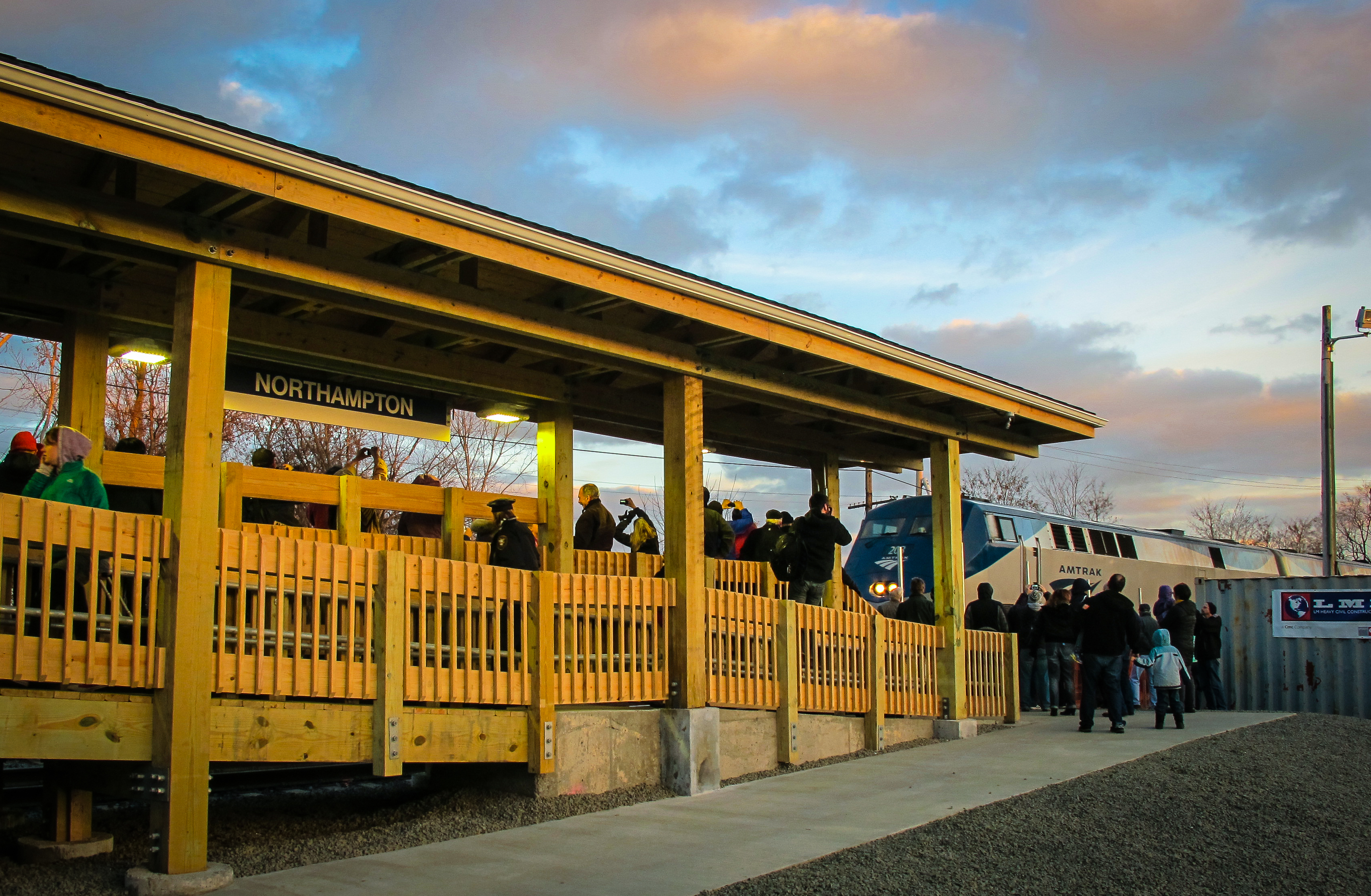
The first northbound Vermonter arriving in Northampton

In order to shorten travel times on the Vermonter and add additional local service to serve the populated Connecticut River Valley, the Conn River Line was rebuilt with $73 million in federal American Recovery and Reinvestment Act money and $10 million in state funds.

The Vermonter was rerouted to the line on December 29, 2014, stopping at Northampton, and Greenfield. A temporary accessible platform was built at Northampton for the start of service, intended to be replaced by a permanent 400-foot (120 m)-long platform by the end of 2015. The permanent platform was planned to be bid in combination with an underpass connecting the Norwottuck Rail Trail (part of the Mass Central Rail Trail) with the Northampton Bikeway north of downtown. However, the underpass was bid separately in 2016. Construction on a smaller project, extended the existing platform to 146 feet (45 m), began in April 2019. The $1.6 million project was nearly complete by mid-June.

In 2016, over 17,000 passengers boarded or alighted at the station, significantly exceeding a 2009 projection of 10,000 annual riders. On August 30, 2019, Amtrak extended two daily Amtrak-operated Hartford Line round trips (branded as the Valley Flyer) to Greenfield as a pilot program.
