= Valley Flyer =

Amtrak train from New Haven, CT to Greenfield, MA

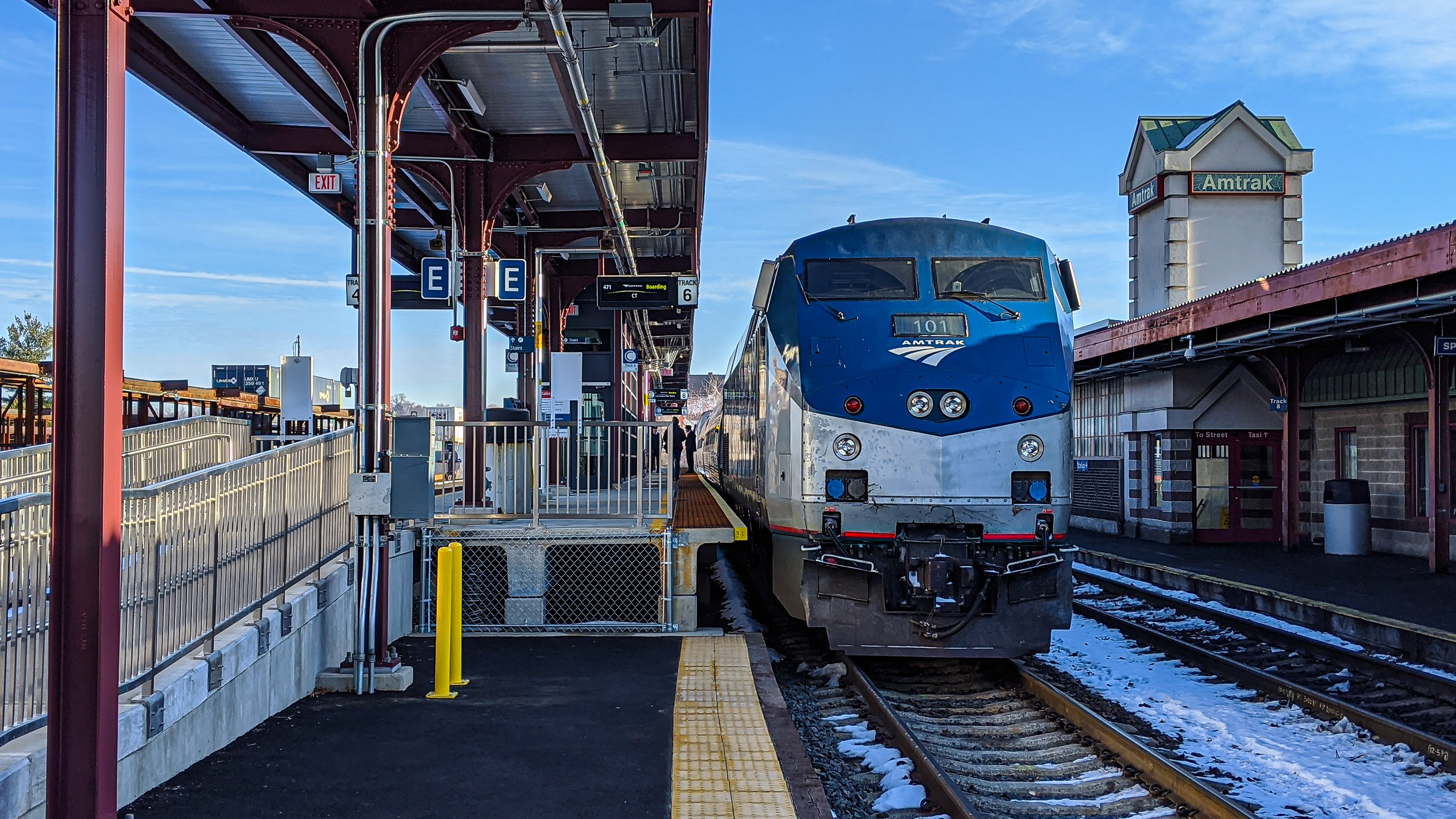
- The Valley Flyer at Springfield in 2020

Overview
- Service type: Inter-city rail
- Status: Operating
- Locale: Connecticut and Massachusetts
- First service: August 30, 2019
- Current operators: Amtrak in partnership with CTDOT and MassDOT
- Website: https://valleyflyer.com

Route
- Termini: New Haven, Connecticut; Greenfield, Massachusetts
- Stops: 12
- Distance travelled: 102 miles (164 km)
- Average journey time: 2 hours, 42-48 minutes
- Service frequency: 2 daily round trips
- Train number: 400, 461, 471, 479, 486, 488, 494, 499

On-board services
- Class: Coach

Technical
- Rolling stock: GE Genesis locomotives, Amfleet coach cars and Ex-Metroliner cab cars
- Track gauge: 4 ft 8 1/2 in (1,435 mm) standard gauge
- Operating speed: Up to 110 mph (180 km/h) (New Haven–Springfield); Up to 79 mph (127 km/h) (Springfield–Greenfield)
- Track owners: Amtrak & MassDOT

The Valley Flyer is a passenger train operated by Amtrak between New Haven, Connecticut and Greenfield, Massachusetts along Amtrak's New Haven–Springfield Line and the Massachusetts Department of Transportation's (MassDOT's) Connecticut River Line.

Valley Flyer trains meet Acela and Northeast Regional services at New Haven Union Station where passengers can typically make a cross-platform transfer between trains. Departures on the Valley Flyer are timed to make day trips between the Connecticut River Valley and New York City possible.

South of Springfield, the Valley Flyer complements the Hartford Line commuter rail service operated by the Connecticut Department of Transportation and the Amtrak Hartford Line service. North of Springfield, it complements Amtrak's Vermonter, offering travelers in the Valley three daily round trips on the Connecticut River Line.

== History ==
On June 12, 2018, Massachusetts Governor Charlie Baker announced that two daily round trip Hartford Line trains (then called New Haven–Springfield Shuttle) would be extended to Greenfield in 2019 as a pilot program. By February 2019, the two-year pilot was expected to begin in June 2019; however, by that May it was delayed to later in the year.

On August 30, 2019, the Valley Flyer program began with a 5:45 am departure south from Greenfield. As a basis for continuing the Valley Flyer permanently, MassDOT set a goal of attracting at least 24,000 new riders per year during the pilot program. To this end, the 2020 Massachusetts state budget provided $250,000 to market the program. Thewatsons—a New York-based ad agency that has worked with Grand Central Terminal and CTrides—was contracted in fall 2019 to create the marketing campaign. From March 30, 2020, to July 26, 2021, one daily round trip was suspended due to the COVID-19 pandemic.

In October 2022, MassDOT and Amtrak announced that the Valley Flyer service had matched projected ridership and would be made permanent.

=== Proposed extension ===
In the 2021 Vermont Rail Plan, VTrans modeled the potential extension of one daily Valley Flyer round-trip north from Greenfield to White River Junction, Vermont, and south from New Haven to Washington. This service would further supplement the Vermonter by doubling its frequency at four stations in Vermont and one in New Hampshire. VTrans forecast that this extension would attract an additional 30,500 to 50,200 riders per year by 2040. VTrans also considered extending a second daily Valley Flyer round-trip north to Brattleboro, but dropped this idea since the station lacks a turning mechanism.

== Service ==
Two New Haven-Greenfield round-trips are offered on weekdays, with southbound trains in the morning and northbound in the evening. On weekends, one similarly scheduled New Haven-Greenfield round-trip is offered, in addition to a reverse round trip between Springfield and Greenfield. Valley Flyer trains meet Acela Express and Northeast Regional services at New Haven Union Station where passengers can typically make a cross-platform transfer between trains. Departures on the Valley Flyer are timed to make day trips between the Connecticut River Valley and New York City possible.

Southbound Valley Flyer trains require an equipment move from the crew base and equipment layover yard at Springfield Union Station to the Olver Transit Center in Greenfield prior to the Greenfield departure as Amtrak does not have any crew or turnaround facilities in the area. Likewise, equipment and crews on northbound trips must dead head back to Springfield after unloading all Greenfield passengers. For the weekend Valley Flyer, tickets are available for these moves (trains 400 and 499.) On weekdays, these trips are dead head moves and are not open to passengers. Another unique operational aspect of the Valley Flyer is the need for the push pull trains to reverse directions twice at Springfield during the trip due to the station’s location just to the east of the intersection between the Amtrak Springfield Line, MassDOT Connecticut River Line, and CSX Berkshire Subdivision.

== Stations ==
State	Milepost (km)	Location	Station	Connections
Massachusetts	102 mi (164 km)	Greenfield	John W. Olver Transit Center	Amtrak: Vermonter; FRTA: 20, 21, 24, 31, 32, 41 PVTA: PG; Greyhound Lines
Massachusetts	83 mi (134 km)	Northampton	Northampton Union Station	Amtrak: Vermonter; PVTA: B48, G73E, R41
Massachusetts	72 mi (116 km)	Holyoke	Holyoke	Amtrak: Vermonter; PVTA: G19, T24, R29
Massachusetts	62 mi (100 km)	Springfield	Springfield Union Station	Amtrak: Lake Shore Limited, Northeast Regional, Vermonter, Hartford Line; CTrail: Hartford Line; PVTA: G1, G2, G3, B4, G5, B6, B7, R10, P11, B12, R14, B17, P20, P21, P21E, G73E, X92, WS, PS; Greyhound Lines, Peter Pan Bus Lines
Connecticut	47.4 mi (76.3 km)	Windsor Locks	Windsor Locks	Amtrak: Northeast Regional, Vermonter, Hartford Line; CTrail: Hartford Line
Connecticut	42.9 mi (69.0 km)	Windsor	Windsor	Amtrak: Northeast Regional, Hartford Line; CTrail: Hartford Line
Connecticut	36.7 mi (59.1 km)	Hartford	Hartford Union Station	Amtrak: Northeast Regional, Vermonter, Hartford Line; CTrail: Hartford Line; CTfastrak
Connecticut	26.1 mi (42.0 km)	Berlin	Berlin	Amtrak: Northeast Regional, Hartford Line; CTrail: Hartford Line
Connecticut	18.7 mi (30.1 km)	Meriden	Meriden Transit Center	Amtrak: Northeast Regional, Vermonter, Hartford Line; CTrail: Hartford Line
Connecticut	13.0 mi (20.9 km)	Wallingford	Wallingford	Amtrak: Northeast Regional, Hartford Line; CTrail: Hartford Line
Connecticut	0.6 mi (0.97 km)	New Haven	New Haven State Street	Amtrak: Northeast Regional, Hartford Line; CTrail: Hartford Line, Shore Line East; Metro-North Railroad: ■ New Haven Line
Connecticut	0 mi (0 km)	New Haven	New Haven Union Station	Amtrak: Acela, Hartford Line, Northeast Regional, Vermonter; CTrail: Hartford Line, Shore Line East; Metro-North Railroad: ■ New Haven Line; Local bus: CTtransit New Haven; Intercity bus: Greyhound, Peter Pan
