= Willimantic station =

Former railway station in Willimantic, Connecticut, US

Willimantic
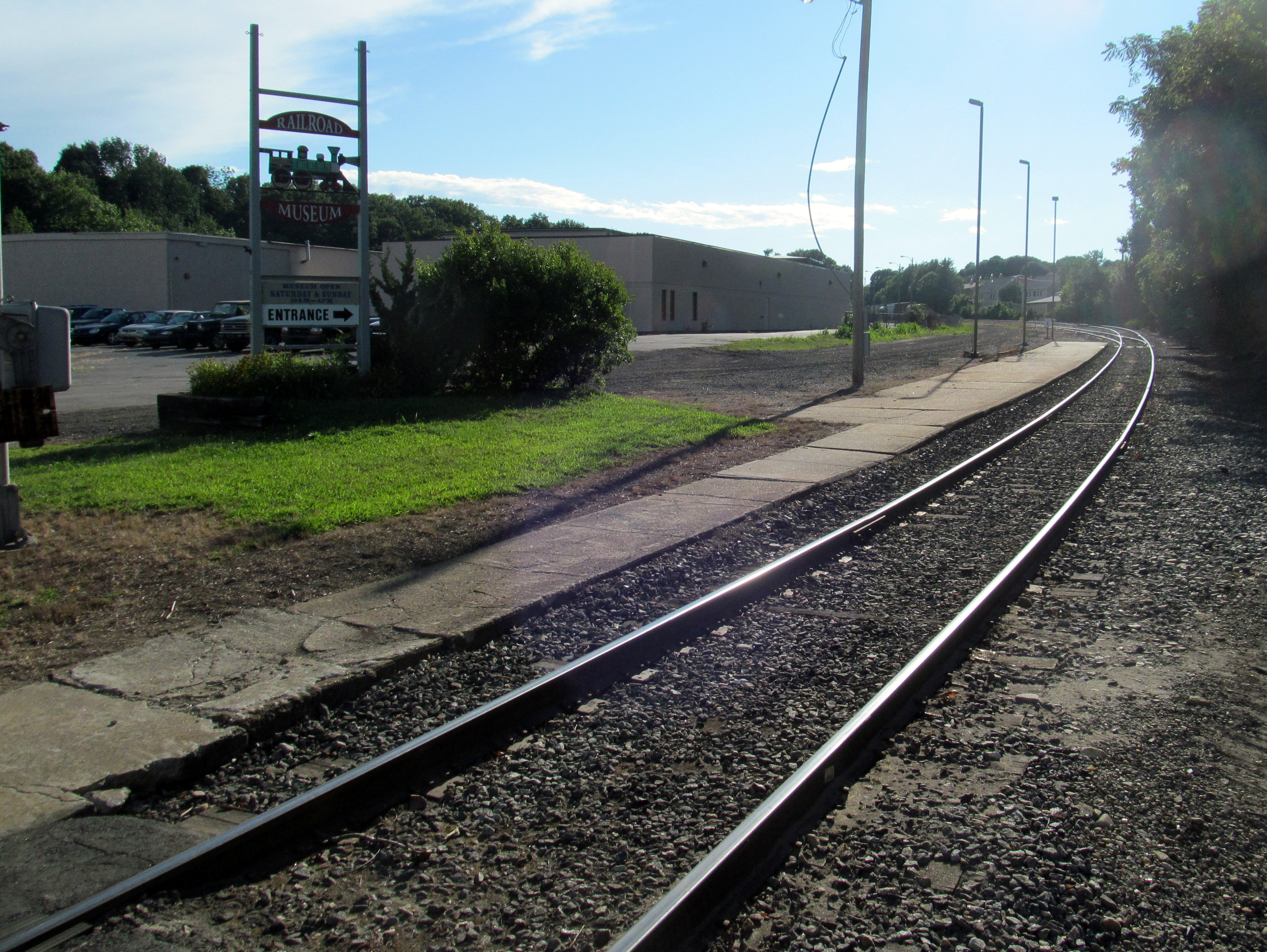
- Former station platform in August 2013

General information
- Location: 55 Bridge Street, Willimantic, Connecticut
- Coordinates: 41°42′45.5″N 72°13′10.3″W
- Line: New England Central Railroad
- Platforms: 1 side platform
- Tracks: 1

Construction
- Parking: Yes
- Accessible: No

Other information
- Station code: WIM

History
- Opened: 1849; November 1991
- Closed: 1955; 1995

Passengers
- 1994: 3,000

Former services
Preceding station	Amtrak	Following station
New London toward Washington, D.C.	Montrealer	Amherst toward Montreal
Location

Willimantic is a former intercity rail station located in Willimantic, Connecticut. Amtrak service to Willimantic began in 1991 with the Montrealer; it was closed in 1995 when the service was replaced by the Vermonter and no longer ran through Willimantic. The station consisted of an illuminated concrete platform alongside a parking lot (the platform remains intact as of 2024). The former station site is about one mile east of the Connecticut Eastern Railroad Museum, which was established the in 1995, the same year the station closed.

Amtrak schedules would refer to the stop as "Willimantic, CT (Storrs)", since this was the closest railroad station to the University of Connecticut Storrs Campus (located approximately 7 miles north of Willimantic).

== History ==
Before Amtrak, passenger rail service existed in Willimantic until 1955.

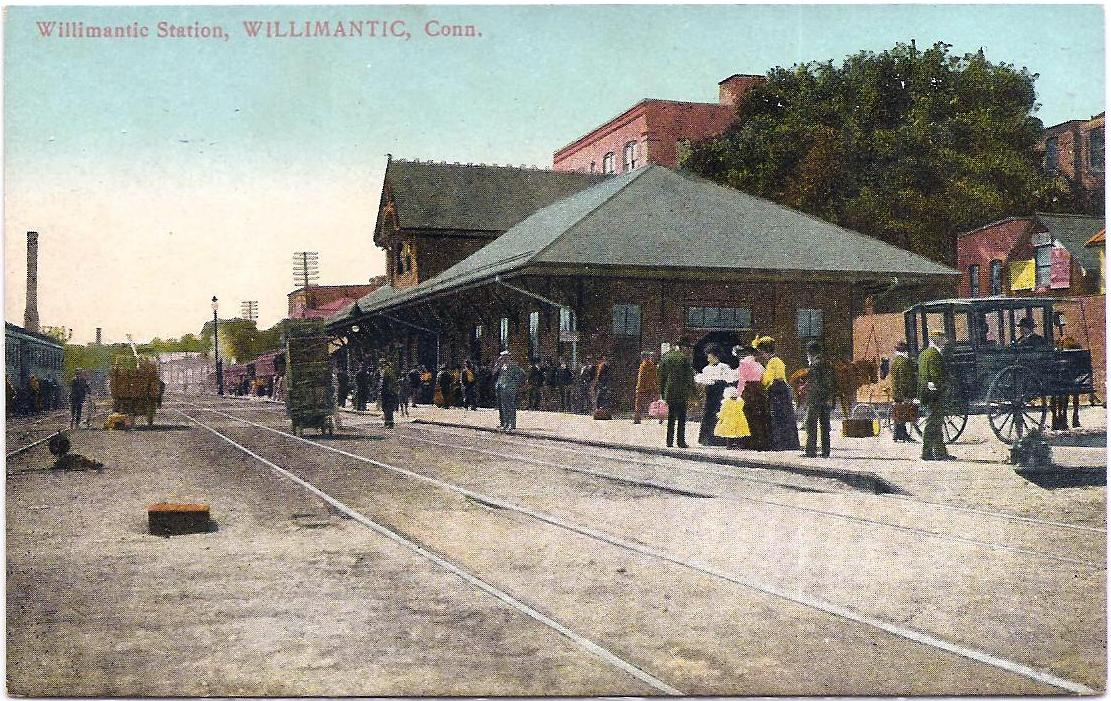
The original station in downtown Willimantic
