= Amherst station (Massachusetts) =

Former railway station in Amherst, Massachusetts, US

Amherst
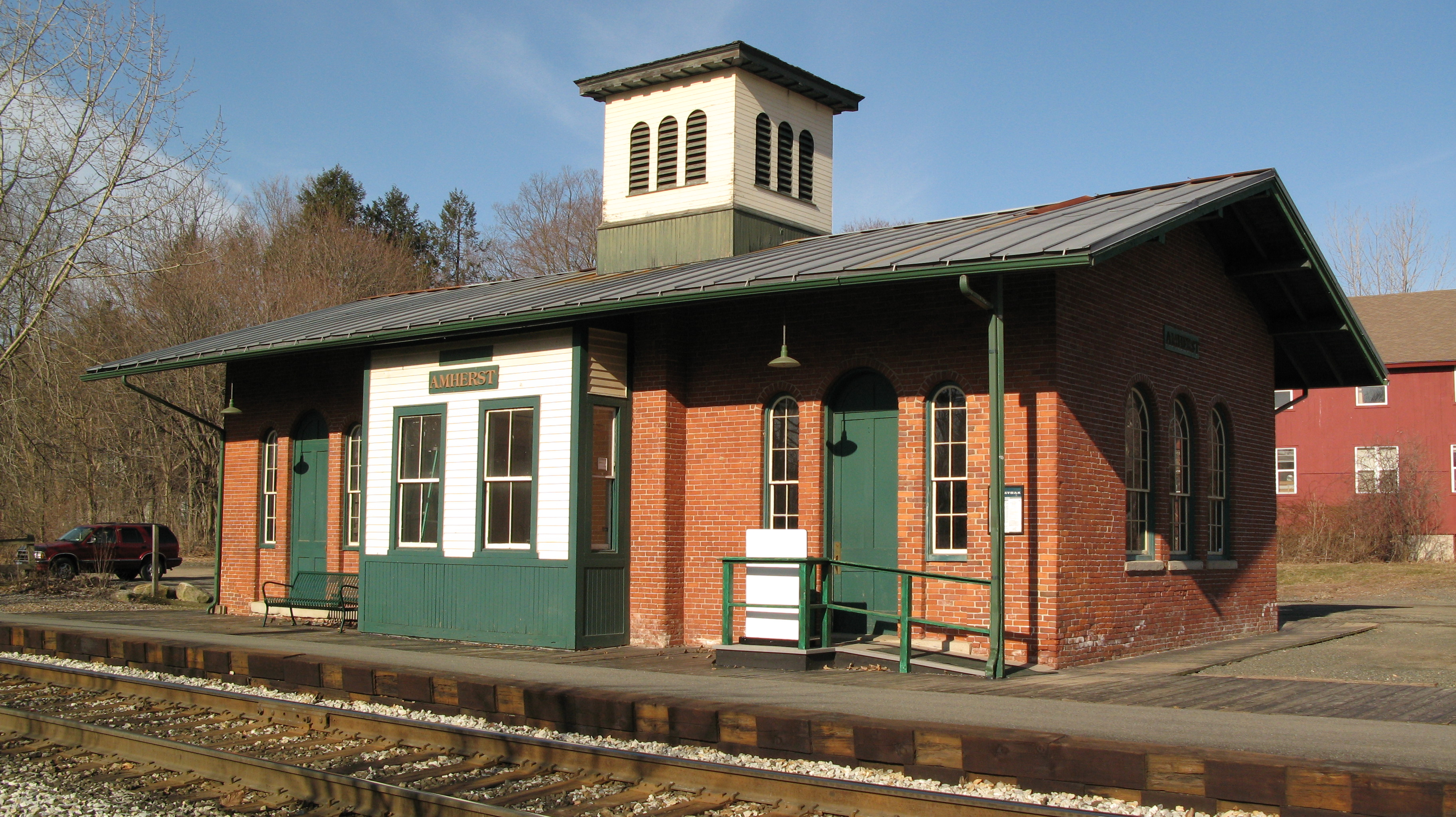
- Amherst station in February 2008

General information
- Location: 13 Railroad Street, Amherst, Massachusetts
- Coordinates: 42°22′30″N 72°30′41″W
- Line: New England Central Railroad
- Platforms: 1 side platform
- Tracks: 1

Construction
- Accessible: No

Other information
- Station code: AMM

History
- Opened: 1853, July 18, 1989
- Closed: 1966; December 28, 2014
- Rebuilt: 1992

Passengers
- FY2014: 14,124 (last year of service)

Former services
Preceding station	Amtrak	Following station
Springfield toward Washington, D.C.	Vermonter 1995–2014	Brattleboro toward St. Albans
Willimantic toward Washington, D.C.	Montrealer 1989–1995	Brattleboro toward Montreal
Preceding station	Central Vermont Railway	Following station
Norwottuck toward New London	Main Line	Cushman toward St. Johns
Location

Amherst is a former intercity rail station located in Amherst, Massachusetts. The station was built by the Amherst and Belchertown Railroad in 1853; it was served by the Central Vermont Railway until 1947. Amtrak service began in 1989 with the Montrealer; it was replaced by the Vermonter in 1995. The station was closed on December 28, 2014, when the Vermonter was rerouted to the faster Connecticut River Line to the west. It is listed on the National Register of Historic Places as a contributing property to the Dickinson Historic District.

== History ==
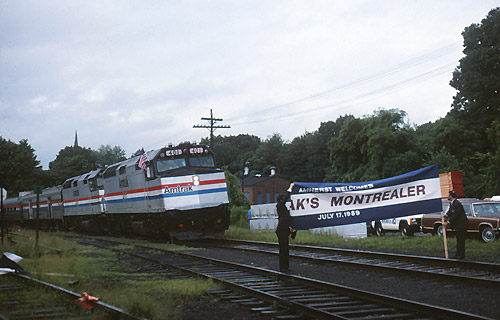
A special train celebrating the return of the Montrealer poses with a ceremonial barrier at Amherst station on July 17, 1989, the day before regular service began

The station was built in 1853 by the Amherst and Belchertown Railroad—the only brick station on the line. Service began in May 1853 under lease to the New London, Willimantic and Palmer Railroad (NLW&P). Amherst was the northern terminus of the line until 1867, when the New London Northern Railroad (NLN)—which had taken over the bankrupt companies—completed an extension to Millers Falls on the Vermont and Massachusetts Railroad. The line became part of the Vermont Central Railroad in 1871, which was taken over in 1873 by the Central Vermont Railroad (after 1899, the Central Vermont Railway [CV]). The Central Massachusetts Railroad, which paralleled the NLN south of downtown Amherst, had its own station—the building of which is also still extant—located on South Pleasant Street.

Passenger service on the CV south of the Vermont state line ended on September 27, 1947; the station was modified for other uses. On July 18, 1989, the Amtrak Montrealer (which had been discontinued in 1987 due to poor track conditions on the Connecticut River Line in Massachusetts and the CV in Vermont) was restored on a new routing via Amherst, with a stop there. The building, which is privately owned, was restored to its original condition in 1992. The interior was split between a passenger waiting area and a commercial space. On April 1, 1995, the Montrealer was cut back to St. Albans, Vermont and renamed as the Vermonter.

In 2014, the Connecticut River Line was rebuilt for renewed passenger service. On December 29, 2014, the Vermonter was rerouted to that line, serving stops at Northampton, Greenfield, and later Holyoke. The last day of service to Amherst was December 28.
