= Connecticut River Line =

Railway line in the United States of America

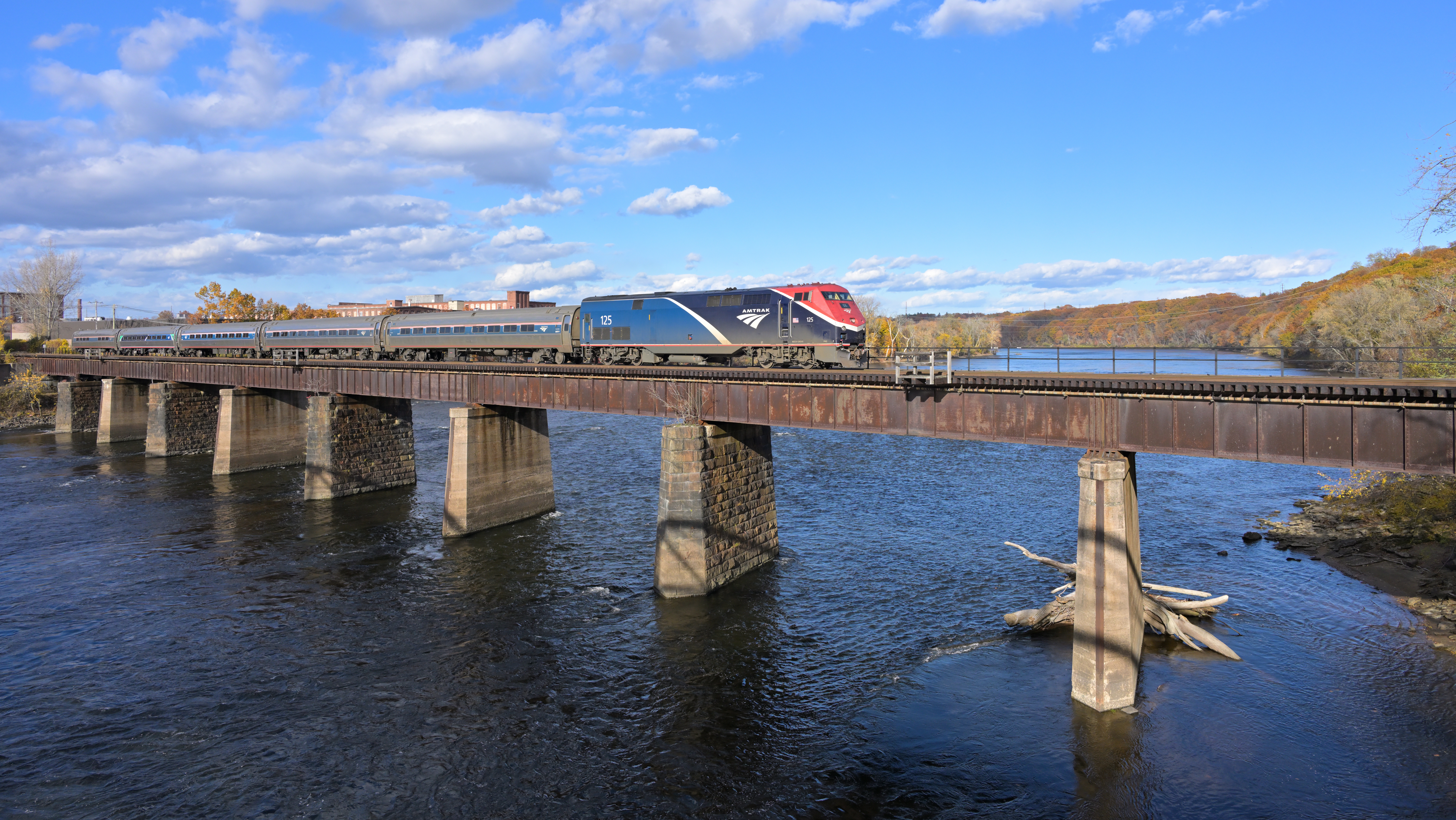
- A southbound Amtrak Vermonter crosses the Connecticut River between Holyoke and Chicopee in Massachusetts

Overview
- Owner: MassDOT
- Locale: Western Massachusetts
- Termini: Springfield, Massachusetts; East Northfield, Massachusetts
- Stations: 4

Service
- Type: Regional rail Freight rail
- System: Amtrak; Pan Am Southern
- Services: Vermonter; Valley Flyer

Technical
- Line length: 50 mi (80 km)
- Number of tracks: 1-2
- Track gauge: 1,435 mm (4 ft 8 1/2 in) standard gauge
- Operating speed: 79 mph (127 km/h)

The Connecticut River Line (colloquially known as the Conn River Line) is a railroad line owned by the Massachusetts Department of Transportation (MassDOT), running between Springfield and East Northfield, Massachusetts.

Freight rail service along the line is operated by Berkshire and Eastern Railroad, and passenger rail service is operated by Amtrak. The line is dispatched and operated on behalf of MassDOT by the Berkshire and Eastern Railroad, a subsidiary of Genesee & Wyoming.

== History ==
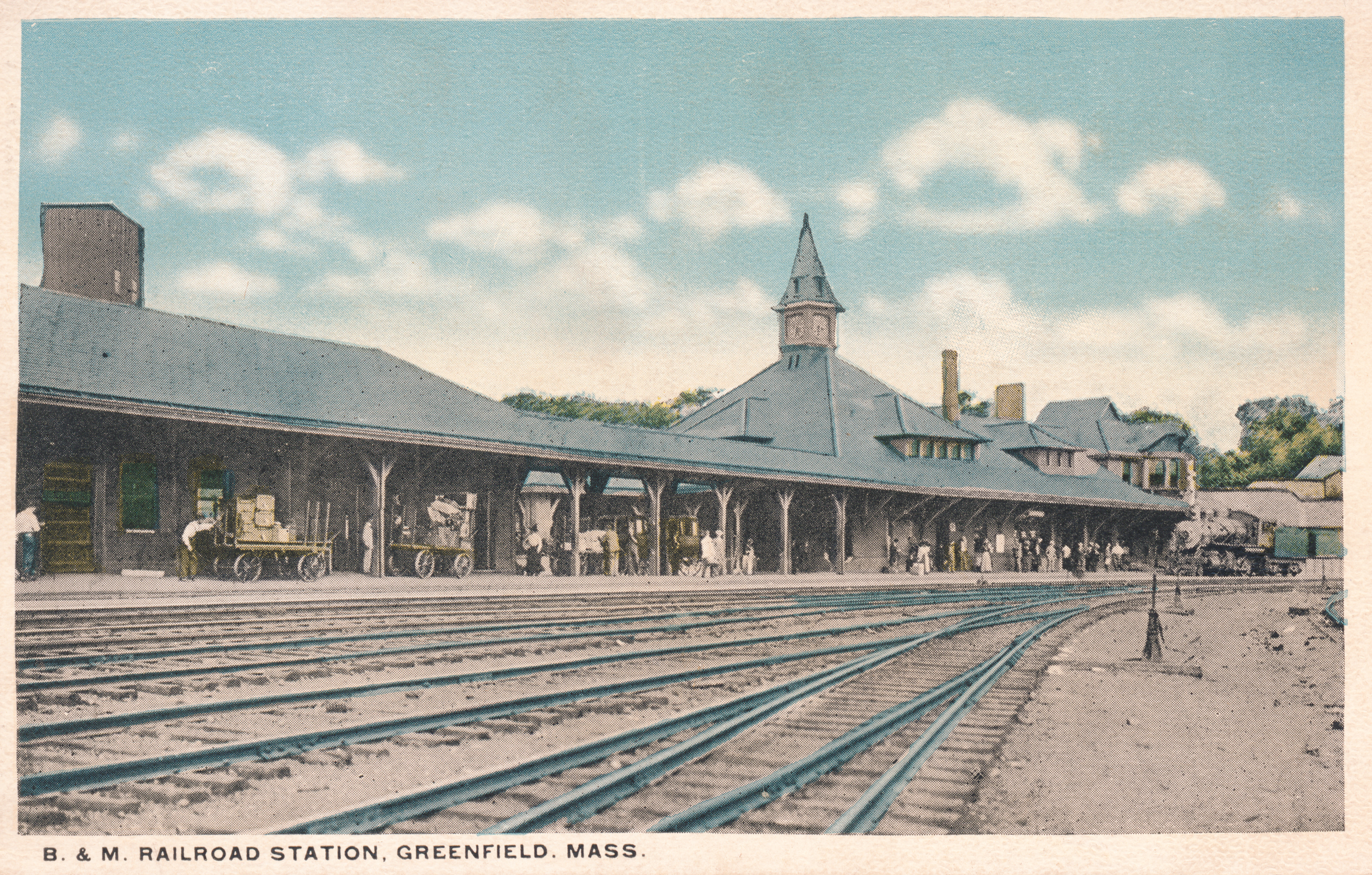
Greenfield station around 1900

The original line between Springfield and Northampton was built by the Northampton and Springfield Railroad (chartered in 1842) during the early 1840s. While the line was under construction, the rail company merged with another company building a line from Greenfield, Massachusetts, south to Northampton. The Connecticut River Railroad (CRRR) was then formed in 1845 by the merger of the Northampton and Springfield Railroad with the Greenfield and Northampton Railroad.

The line opened between Springfield and Northampton in 1845 and by the following summer was extended to Deerfield, and then to Greenfield in November 1846. In 1849, the line was extended further north to the Massachusetts-Vermont state line, where it met the Brattleboro line of the Vermont and Massachusetts Railroad (which later became part of the Fitchburg Railroad).

The line became part of the Boston and Maine Corporation (B&M) in 1893 when the CRRR was acquired by the B&M. In 1983 the line became part of Guilford Rail System (which later became Pan Am Railways). Pan Am Railways sold the line to the Massachusetts Department of Transportation in late 2014, but retained an exclusive common carrier freight easement over the line and continued to maintain and dispatch the line under a contract with MassDOT. The Berkshire and Eastern Railroad took over Pan Am's operations on the line in September 2023.

=== Decline of service ===
Several local trains were dropped during systemwide cuts on May 18, 1958. Most local service ended on June 14, 1959; stops at Brightwood, Riverside, Mount Tom, Whately, and Deerfield were dropped. Local passengers were allowed to use the four daily through trains for service to Holyoke, Northampton, South Deerfield, and Greenfield; limited Friday and Sunday service to serve college students was also retained. The Springfield–Greenfield sections of two daily through trains were dropped on April 29, 1962, leaving just two daily round trips – the Montrealer/Washingtonian and Ambassador. Those trains were cut on September 6, 1966, ending through passenger service over the line. Limited local service (one southbound Friday trip, and two Sunday round trips) between Springfield and Brattleboro lasted until later that year.

In 1972, Amtrak began running the Montrealer along the line at night, stopping at Northampton but not Holyoke or Greenfield. The Montrealer was discontinued in 1987 due to poor track conditions on the line. Service resumed in 1989 after Amtrak seized control of the line in Vermont from the Boston and Maine Railroad, but the train was rerouted over the Central Vermont Railway through Massachusetts and Connecticut to avoid the still-dilapidated Connecticut River Line, because Guilford Rail System refused to improve poor track conditions. A stop was added at Amherst to replace Northampton. The Montrealer was replaced by the daytime Vermonter in 1995, using the original route through Connecticut but still avoiding the Conn River Line in Massachusetts.

Freight service along the Connecticut River line has for many years been operated by Pan Am Railways. In recent years the line has been operated at FRA Class I levels, with freight trains limited to a maximum speed of 10 miles per hour (16 km/h). Due to these conditions, there are only a few remaining online customers. One of the largest potential customers, Yankee Candle, despite being on the other side of the road, receives wax shipments via truck from a competing railroad's depot further south.

=== Reconstruction and resumed service ===
In order to shorten travel times on the Vermonter and add additional local service to the populated Connecticut River Valley, the Connecticut River Line was rebuilt with $73 million in federal American Recovery and Reinvestment Act of 2009 money and $10 million in state funds. The restoration work on the line included the replacement of about 95,000 ties; installation of 49 miles (79 km) of new continuously welded rail; new active warning signals and crossing gates at 23 public grade crossings and four private crossings; upgrades to six bridges; and the first phase of a new signal installation. Restoration work began in August 2012 and was scheduled to be completed in 2016.

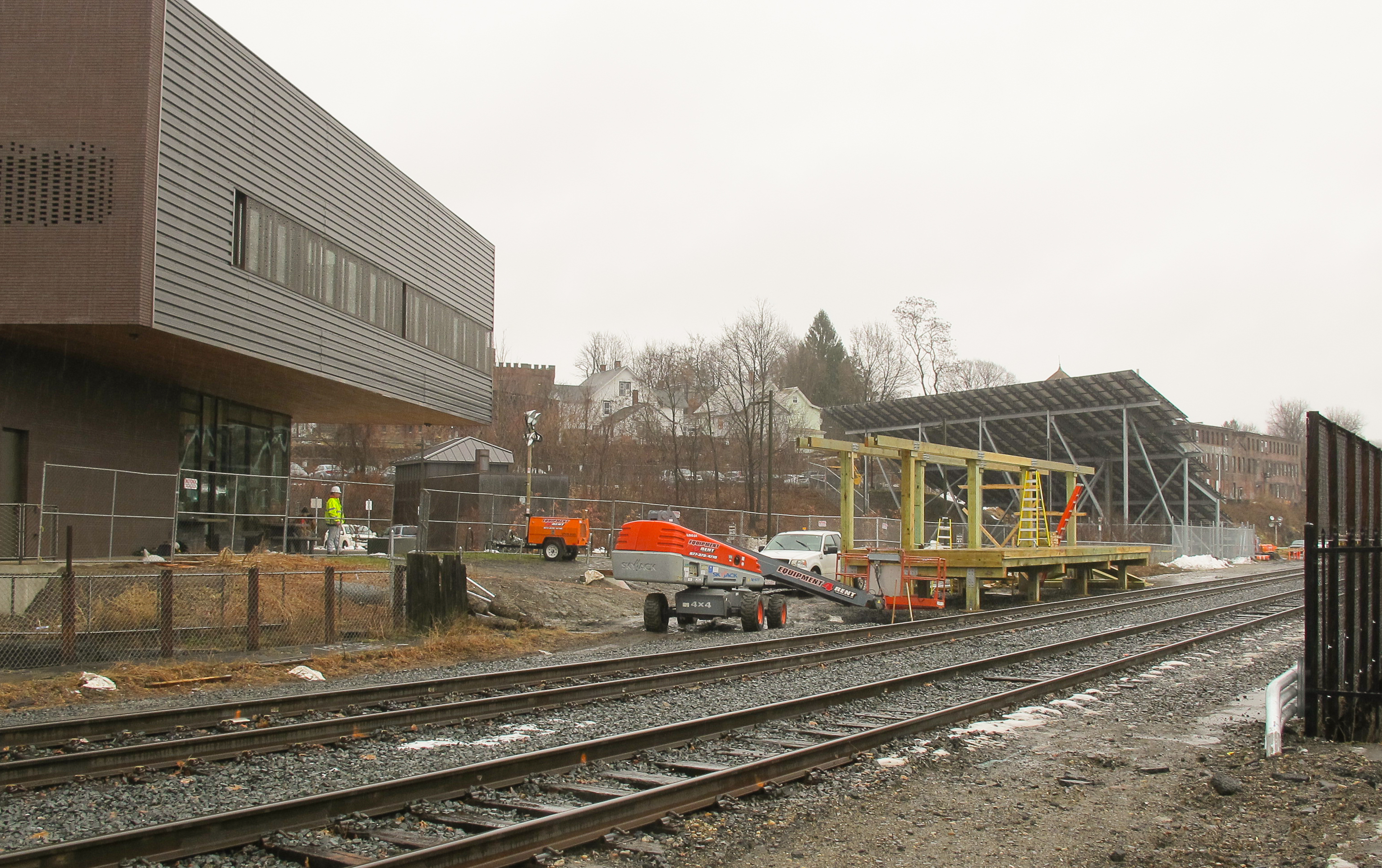
Platform work at Greenfield in December 2014

A 100-person Norfolk Southern Railway work crew began major track work on July 7, 2014, intending to complete the line's upgrade over the summer. The arrival of the NS crew allowed the Pan Am crews, who had previously started the track work, to focus on grade crossings and other work on the line.

Commuter rail service has been proposed for the corridor, running between Springfield and Greenfield with four daily round trips. A 2014 state transportation funding bill included $30 million for acquiring used MBTA Commuter Rail rolling stock and new locomotives for the service. On August 20, 2014, the state finalized a $17 million deal to purchase the line from Pan Am Southern.

In 2014, following several years of planning and construction, the original mainline was restored to modern standards, with a maximum authorized speed of 79 miles per hour (127 km/h) for passenger trains on the long straight sections of track between Hatfield and Deerfield. The Vermonter was rerouted to the line on December 29, 2014, stopping at Northampton and Greenfield. New handicapped-accessible platforms have been built at both of these stations. A station stop in Holyoke was added in the summer of 2015.

In February 2016, Massachusetts Secretary of Transportation Stephanie Pollack said that MassDOT was looking at starting a pilot commuter service as early as 2017. In June 2018, Governor Charlie Baker announced that two Amtrak Shuttle round trips would be extended to Greenfield in 2019 as a pilot program. The service began August 31, 2019, and is operated under the Valley Flyer moniker.

In October 2022, MassDOT and Amtrak announced that the Valley Flyer service had matched projected ridership and would be made permanent.

== Stations ==
All stations are located in Massachusetts.

Milepost (km)	Station	Location	Current station opened	Line services		Connections
Milepost (km)	Station	Location	Current station opened	VF	VT	Connections
0 mi (0 km)	Springfield Union Station	Springfield	1926	●	●	Amtrak: Lake Shore Limited, Hartford Line (non-Valley Flyer service), Northeast Regional; CT Rail: Hartford Line; Pioneer Valley Transit Authority: 1, 2, 3, 4, 5, 6, 7, 10, 11E, 12E, 14, 17, 20, 20E, 21, 21E, 92
10 mi (16 km)	Holyoke	Holyoke	August 27, 2015	●	●	Pioneer Valley Transit Authority: R24, R29, T24, X90
21 mi (34 km)	Northampton	Northampton	December 29, 2014	●	●	Pioneer Valley Transit Authority: B48, R41, R44
40 mi (64 km)	John W. Olver Transit Center	Greenfield	December 29, 2014	●	●	Franklin Regional Transit Authority: 21, 22, 23, 31, 32, 41; Greyhound Lines

== See also ==
- Connecticut River Railroad
- Northern New England Corridor
- East-West Passenger Rail
