= Union Station (Brattleboro, Vermont) =

Railway station in Brattleboro, Vermont

Brattleboro, VT
- The Vermonter at the current Brattleboro station in July 2026. The paved surface to the right of the tracks was the former platform, and the old station building is to the far right.

General information
- Location: 21 Depot Road; Brattleboro, Vermont; United States
- Coordinates: 42.8509°N 72.5566°W
- Line: New England Central Railroad
- Platforms: 1 side platform
- Tracks: 2
- Connections: The Current: 4, 5, 7, 7S, 10, 11, 53, Brattleboro White Line

Construction
- Parking: Yes
- Accessible: Yes

Other information
- Station code: Amtrak: BRA

History
- Opened: February 20, 1849
- Rebuilt: 1880, 1915, June 24, 2024–June 24, 2026

Passengers
- FY 2025: 16,682 (Amtrak)

Services
Preceding station	Amtrak	Following station
Greenfield toward Washington, D.C.	Vermonter	Bellows Falls toward St. Albans
Former services
Preceding station	Amtrak	Following station
Northampton 1972–1987 toward Washington, D.C.	Montrealer	Bellows Falls toward Montreal
Amherst 1987–1995 toward Washington, D.C.	Montrealer	Bellows Falls toward Montreal
Amherst 1995–2014 toward Washington, D.C.	Vermonter	Bellows Falls toward St. Albans
Preceding station	Central Vermont Railway	Following station
Vernon toward New London	Main Line	Bellows Falls toward St. Johns
- Union Station
- U.S. National Register of Historic Places
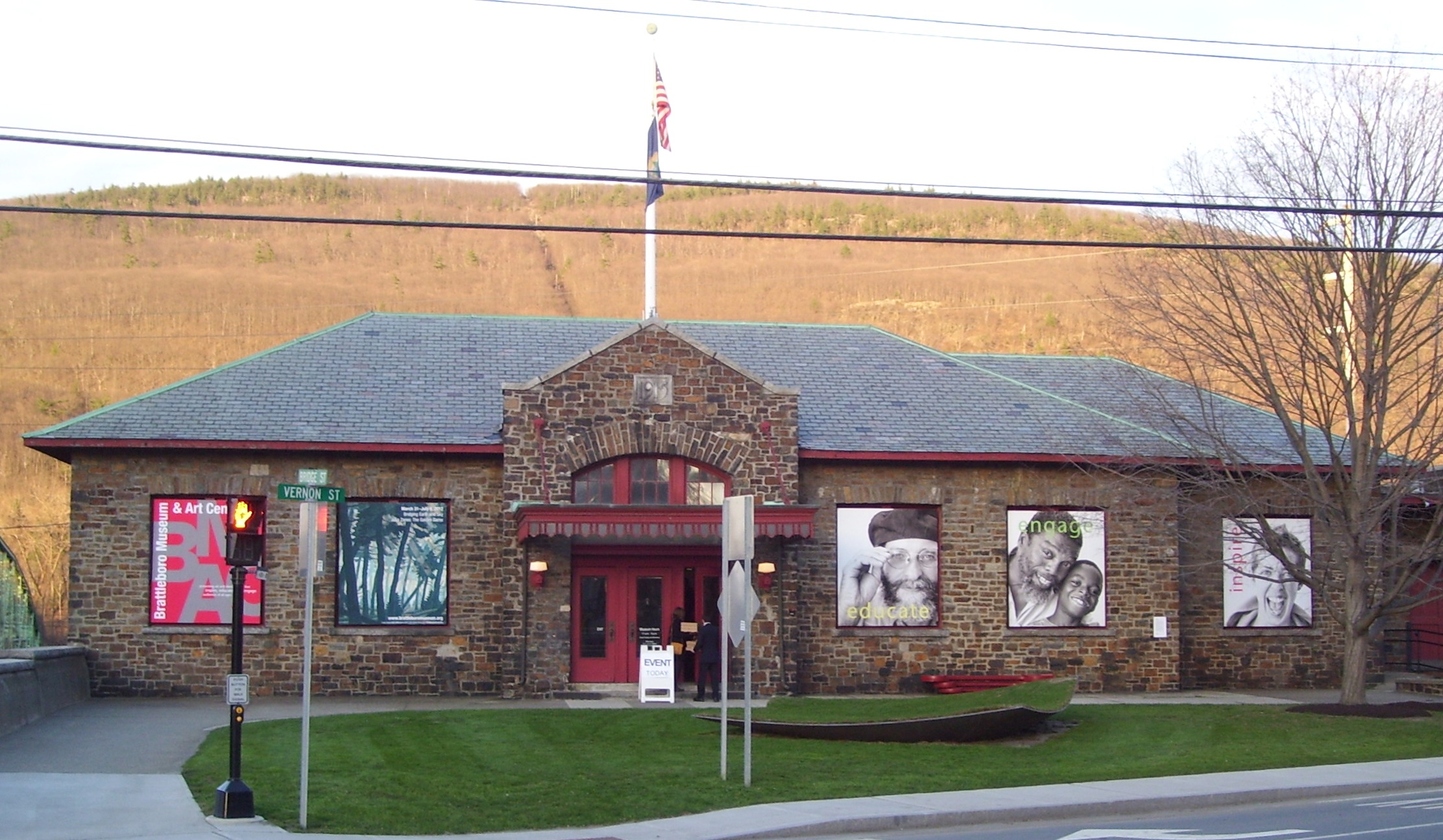
- Brattleboro Museum & Art Center in 2012
- NRHP reference No.: 74000268
- Added to NRHP: June 6, 1974
Location

Union Station is a historic former station building in Brattleboro, Vermont, United States. It operated as a train station from 1915 to 1966, and again from 1972 until 2026. Repurposed as the Brattleboro Museum and Art Center in 1972, the building was added to the National Register of Historic Places in 1974.

Amtrak's passenger station moved in June 2026 to the new, fully accessible, Brattleboro Station, located immediately behind the historic building. The new facility serves Amtrak's daily Vermonter.

== History ==
=== Early stations and Union Station ===
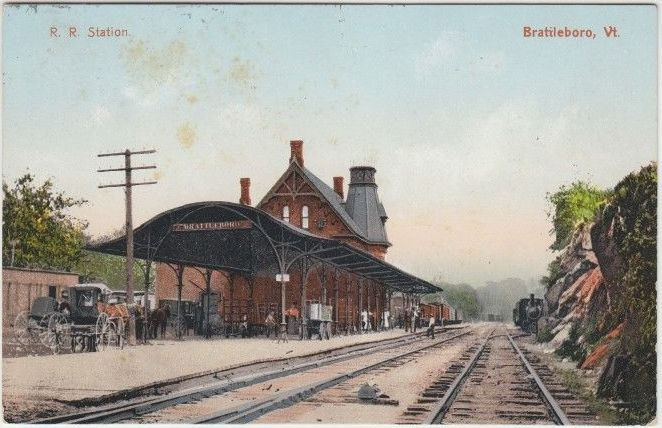
Postcard of the 1880-built station

The Vermont and Massachusetts Railroad opened from the state line at East Northfield, Massachusetts/South Vernon, Vermont to Brattleboro on February 20, 1849. The Vermont Valley Railroad opened between Brattleboro and Bellows Falls in 1851, completing the all-rail route between Burlington, Vermont and Springfield, Massachusetts. The three lines became part of the Central Vermont Railway (CV) in 1873. The first Brattleboro station was a long single-story wooden building, no longer extant.

The Brattleboro and Whitehall Railroad, a CV subsidiary, opened to South Londonberry, Vermont in 1880. A two-story Queen Anne style brick station was built that year to replace the original station. Also in 1880, the Connecticut River Railroad obtained control of the CV mainline between Brattleboro and White River Junction. It was taken over by the Boston and Maine Railroad (B&M) in 1893. The B&M opened the Fort Hill Branch of its subsidiary Ashuelot Railroad between Brattleboro and South Vernon in 1913; it was operated as a second track of the existing CV mainline.

The CV and B&M jointly constructed a union station at Brattleboro in 1915. Built at a cost of $75,000 (equivalent to $1,680,000 in 2024), it was made of quartzite quarried across the river at Wantastiquet Mountain. It was built into a bluff overlooking the Connecticut River, with the first story at track level and the third story facing the street. A footbridge crossed the tracks to reach the northbound platform.

=== Decline and revival ===
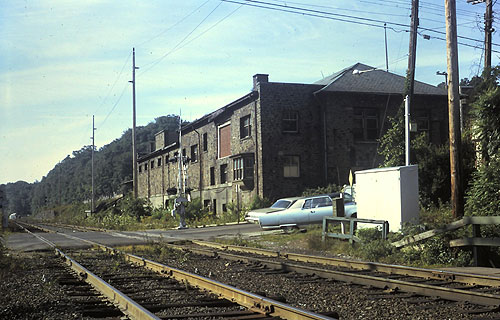
Brattleboro station in 1972, shortly before the Montrealer resumed service

CV passenger service to South Londonberry ended in 1927 and resumed briefly in 1931. It was operated intermittently by a local man from 1933 to 1935; the line was abandoned in 1938. CV/B&M passenger service to Brattleboro ended in September 1966 with the termination of the Montrealer. The Fort Hill Branch was discontinued as a through route in 1970 and abandoned in 1983. In 1972, the town purchased the disused Union Station building for $27,500 (equivalent to $156,000 in 2024); it was converted to the Brattleboro Museum and Art Center, which opened that year.

Amtrak, which took over intercity passenger rail service in the United States in 1971, began operation of the overnight Montrealer on September 30, 1972. Brattleboro was a stop for the Montrealer from its inception, though a ticket office and waiting room did not open in the lower level of the Union Station building until 1973. Union Station was added to the National Register of Historic Places in 1974. The Montrealer was suspended from 1987 to 1989, then replaced by the daytime Vermonter in 1995. A two-phase project planned in the late 1990s was to include a new train station; the first-phase garage and bus station opened downtown in 2003, but the second-phase station was not built.

=== New station ===
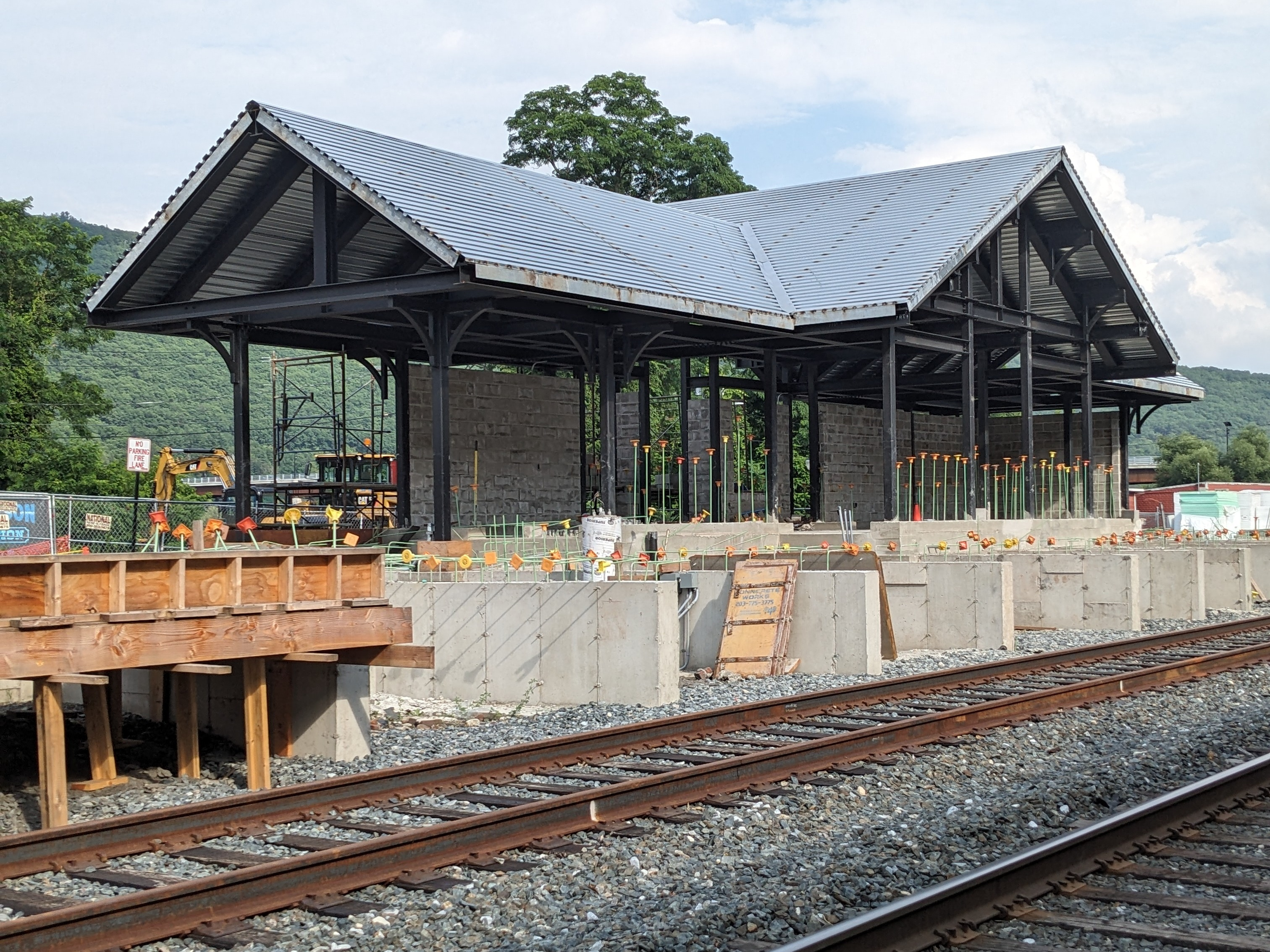
The new station under construction in 2025

Amtrak and the town announced plans in 2020 to build an accessible full-length high-level platform – the first such platform in the state. A $366,000 expansion of the parking area, which involved demolition of the nearby Archery Building, was completed in 2021 ahead of the station project. Contrary to local claims, the small wooden structure on the east side of the tracks was not the original passenger station, but may have originally been a freight house or railroad office.

The building is leased to the museum by the town for $1 per year. Because it does not own the structure, the museum is not able to raise money to repair the building. In 2018, the museum requested that the town sell the building to the museum to allow fundraising. In October 2021, the town proposed to transfer ownership of the station building to the museum for $1, contingent on Amtrak vacating its portion by mid-2024.

Amtrak held a groundbreaking for the new station on June 24, 2024. Construction is expected to last 18 months. Construction cost is expected to be $7.4 million, with a total project cost of $10 million including design and track work. The new platform will be 345 feet (105 m) long. A waiting room with seating and a restroom will be located next to the platform. The new station will include artwork from the Brattleboro Words Project. A sculpture garden is proposed for a parcel between the station and the river. Concrete for the platform was poured in October 2025.

The new station, which is known as Brattleboro Station, opened on June 24, 2026. The station, includes a climate-controlled waiting room, an ADA-accessible restroom a new level boarding platform, which is 345-feet long.
