= Montrealer (train) =

Passenger train operated by Amtrak between New York City and Montreal, Canada

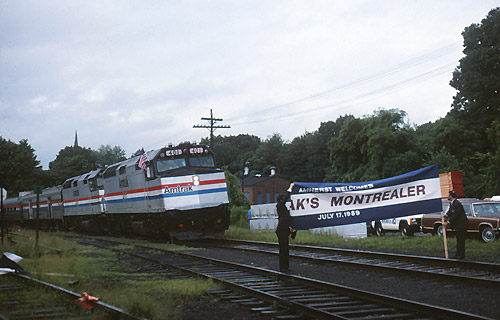
- A special train celebrating the return of the Montrealer poses at Amherst station on July 17, 1989, the day before regular service began.

Overview
- Service type: Inter-city rail
- Status: Discontinued
- Locale: Quebec; New England; Mid-Atlantic states
- First service: June 15, 1924
- Last service: March 31, 1995
- Successor: Vermonter
- Former operators: Amtrak; Boston & Maine; Canadian National; Central Vermont; New Haven Railroad; Pennsylvania Railroad

Route
- Termini: Washington, D.C. Montreal, Quebec
- Stops: 27
- Distance travelled: 666.2 miles (1,072.1 km)
- Service frequency: Daily

On-board services
- Seating arrangements: Reclining seat coaches
- Sleeping arrangements: Sleeping car (1975)
- Catering facilities: Dining car (1975)
- Baggage facilities: Baggage car

The Montrealer was an overnight passenger train between Washington, D.C., United States, and Montreal, Quebec, Canada. The train was operated from 1924 to 1966, and again under Amtrak from 1972 to 1995, except for two years in the 1980s. The train was discontinued in 1995 and replaced by the Vermonter, which provides daytime service as far north as St. Albans, Vermont. Current Amtrak service to Montreal is provided by the daytime Adirondack from New York City via Albany.

== History ==
=== Previous service ===
The original Montrealer entered service on June 15, 1924. The train provided overnight service from Washington, D.C., to New York City and Montreal on a route that passed through New England. The Washingtonian operated over the same route in the southbound direction.

Both trains ran over five railroads: the Pennsylvania Railroad, the New Haven Railroad, the Boston & Maine Railroad, the Central Vermont Railway, and the Canadian National Railway, which worked together to provide the equipment and crews to operate the train.

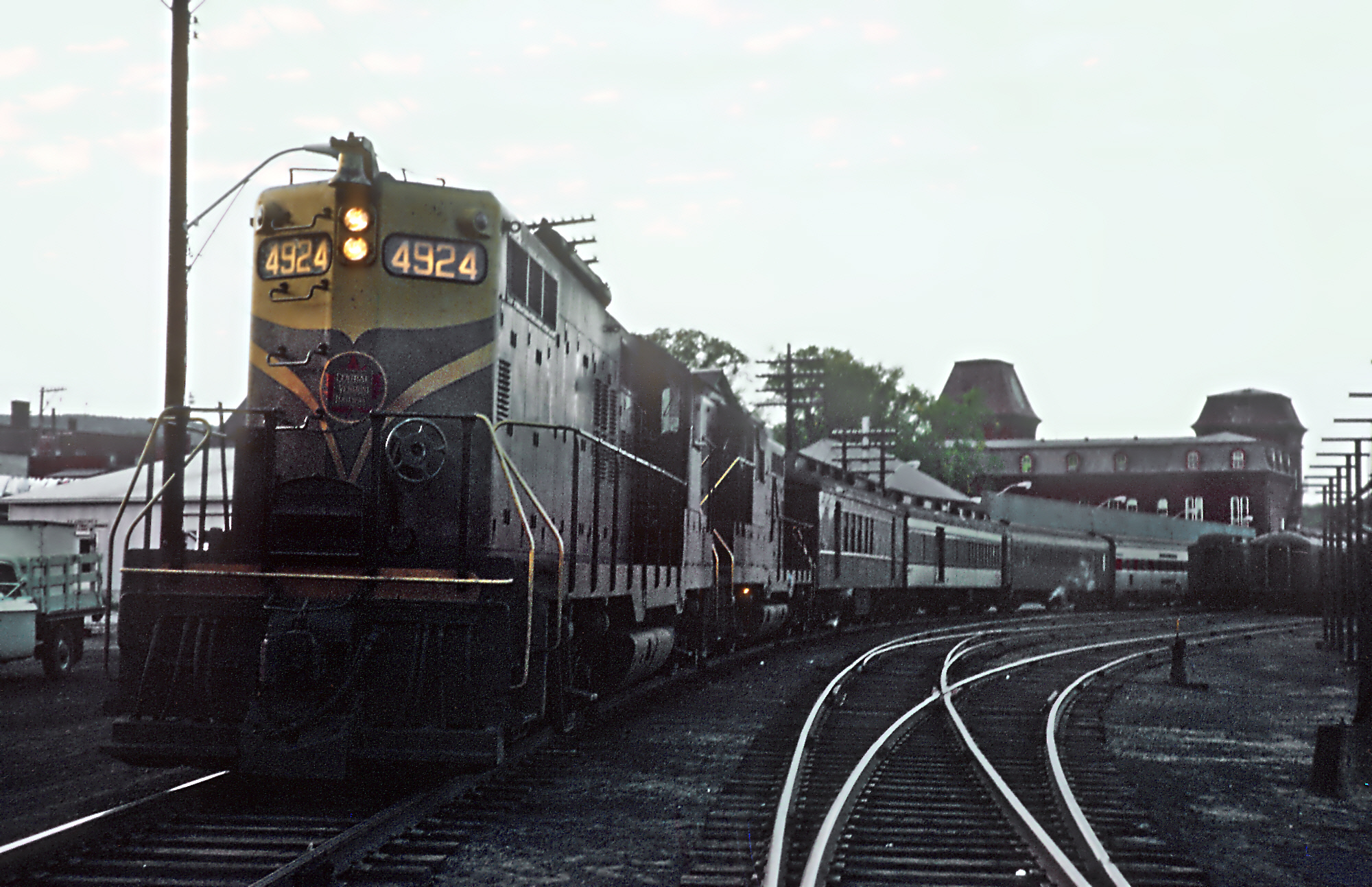
The Montrealer in St. Albans, Vermont in 1965

When it was inaugurated, the Montrealer also provided through service to Ottawa and Quebec City. During the summer months the Quebec car originated a few days a week in Murray Bay, a resort area 86 miles (138 km) northeast of Quebec City.

It its early years, north of the US–Canada border, the train traveled east of Missisquoi Bay and through Iberville. By the 1950s, it had been rerouted through Alburg, Vermont, with stops in Quebec prior to Montreal at Cantic, St. Johns, and St. Lambert.

The Montrealer and the Washingtonian first ran during the days of Prohibition in the United States. The Washingtonian became known unofficially as "The Bootlegger" or simply "The Boot" because passengers often carried well-hidden bottles of liquor on the southbound train. During the Prohibition years the Washingtonian was a favorite target of U.S. federal agents who would board in St. Albans and search the train looking for illegal liquor. During the 1940s extra sections of the train were added for skiers on weekends in the winter months from New York to Waterbury, Vermont.

By the 1960s, service consisted of two daily round trips: the Washington–Montreal Montrealer/Washingtonian, and the New York City–Montrealer section of the Ambassador. On September 6, 1966, the trains were unceremoniously discontinued between Montreal and Springfield, Massachusetts. Previously, the Ambassador had been an entirely separate day train counterpart to the Montrealer. The New Haven Railroad continued to operate its portion of the train between Springfield and New York City until December 31, 1968, when most passenger service on the New Haven–Springfield Line was discontinued, upon the implementation of the merger of the New Haven Railroad into the Penn Central.

=== Amtrak era ===
In 1972, Congress passed a spending provision that required Amtrak to restore service to Canada, specifying the new route had to connect Montreal to Washington, DC. The law set off a competition between officials in New York State and Vermont as both vied to host the new route. New York officials cited better track conditions on the Delaware & Hudson Railroad route and that it was 59 miles shorter. It also required less expensive infrastructure work to host passenger trains, just $1.6 million compared to $3.4 million in Vermont. However, Vermont won out as the train would have been able to serve Pennsylvania Station and points south such as Philadelphia and Washington. The New York route would have required a transfer from Grand Central Terminal. New York state funded its own Adirondack service in 1974, its day-time service complimenting the Montrealer’s overnight schedule.

Amtrak began operation of a New York train, called the Montrealer northbound and Washingtonian southbound, on September 30, 1972. St. Lambert was the only intermediate station in Quebec retained from the previous iteration. It was the first train for which Amtrak hired its own staff, rather than contracting with the host railroad. The train was named Montrealer in both directions on May 19, 1974. The Washingtonian was also Train 185, which came from New York and later, along with most other regular trains on the Northeast Corridor, folded into one NortheastDirect in 1995. The Montrealer acquired a reputation as a party train due to the large numbers of skiers who would take the train, staying up late into the night or not sleeping at all. Amtrak equipped the train with its own dedicated lounge car, outfitted with an electric piano, dubbed Le Pub.

=== Derailments ===
Amtrak's Montrealer suffered numerous derailments during its years of operation:

- On January 5, 1973, the train derailed in Randolph, Vermont, due to a wrongly set switch.
- On September 5, 1981, nine cars of the southbound train derailed in Hatfield, Massachusetts. No serious injuries were reported among the 328 passengers.
- On February 14, 1982, the train derailed in Holyoke, Massachusetts, near the Smith's Ferry section of the city. Four people were treated for minor injuries. An investigation found that the cause of the derailment was a spreading of the tracks.
- On February 14, 1984, the train derailed in Vernon, Vermont.
- On June 29, 1990, the train derailed in Philadelphia, Pennsylvania, on a curve just west of the Philadelphia Zoo. Two passengers were injured.

==== 1984 wreck ====
On the morning of July 7, 1984, the northbound Montrealer (carrying 262 passengers and 16 crew) was derailed by a washed-out culvert between Williston and Essex, Vermont. Heavy rains over the previous night had broken beaver dams upstream, resulting in a 50-foot (15 m) washout in the 20-foot-high (6 m) embankment. Five of the train's thirteen cars fell into the stream, with one sleeper car buried under several other cars. Three passengers, one Amtrak attendant, and one Central Vermont Railway crew member were killed; 29 others were seriously injured. The train included four private chartered passenger cars, doubling the usual passenger load and increasing the number of injured; the resulting rescue operation involved extricating dozens of trapped passengers and was then the largest in Vermont history.

Despite the severity of the wreck, the death toll was low due to circumstances permitting quick rescue: area hospitals were at shift changes with doubled staff levels, a 2,400-person Vermont National Guard detachment with helicopters and a tank retriever was nearby preparing for training, and a large mobile crane was at a construction site in nearby Georgia, Vermont. The National Transportation Safety Board investigation faulted Amtrak for the lack of a proper cab radio and recommended changes in locomotive battery placement, improvements in baggage rack and seat cushion retention, and the use of shatterproof mirrors in passenger cars.

=== Suspension and return ===
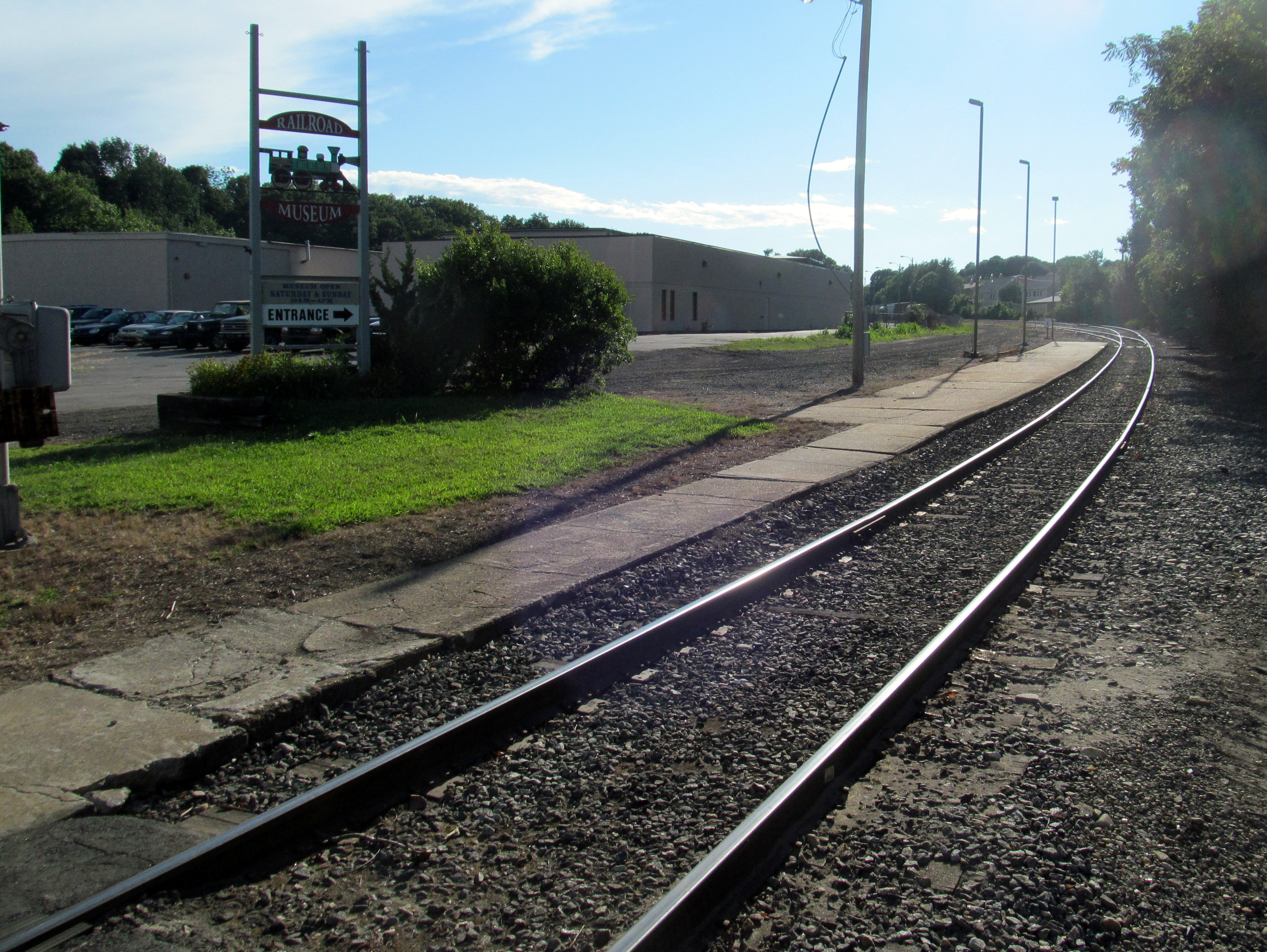
The platform at Willimantic, Connecticut, used from 1991 to 1995

The Montrealer was suspended north of Springfield, Massachusetts, on April 6, 1987, because of deteriorating track conditions between Brattleboro and Windsor, Vermont. During the suspension, Amtrak offered bus service (operated by Peter Pan Bus Lines) between Burlington, Vermont, and Springfield, with connecting Amtrak service in Springfield.

This situation precipitated the only instance of Amtrak seizing another railroad by eminent domain, followed by the re-sale of the track by Amtrak to the Central Vermont Railway. The matter went all the way to the Supreme Court in National Railroad Passenger Corp. v. Boston & Maine Corp., which upheld Amtrak's action. Led by U.S. Senator Patrick Leahy of Vermont and Representative Silvio Conte of Massachusetts, Congress appropriated $5 million to rebuild the track. Only the section between Windsor and Brattleboro, Vermont, was transferred, however, leaving the Connecticut River Line between East Northfield and Springfield, Massachusetts, as an obstacle.

The Montrealer was reinstated in July 1989 with a longer routing to avoid the Connecticut River Line. The train used the Central Vermont Railway between East Northfield and New London, Connecticut (with a stop at Amherst to replace the former Northampton stop) and the Northeast Corridor between New London and New Haven. Although slightly slower than the old route, this allowed for safe and reliable service. A special daytime train was run on July 17, 1989; regular service began with the northbound train on the 18th and the southbound on the 19th. On November 1, 1991, an intermediate stop was added at Willimantic, Connecticut.

Montrealer service ended on March 31, 1995, amid a budget crisis. It was replaced with the Vermonter, a daytime train sponsored by the state of Vermont, the next day. The Vermonter terminated at St. Albans rather than Montreal; it was routed over the New Haven–Springfield Line plus a section of the Boston Subdivision to reach the Central Vermont at Palmer.

=== Planned extension of the Vermonter to Montreal ===
Efforts have been underway for many years to extend the Vermonter to Montreal. In 2012 the Federal Railroad Administration awarded $7.9 million to allow for the upgrade of the existing freight rail line between St. Albans and the Canada–US border. Work on this project was completed in late 2014.

On March 16, 2015, the United States and Canada signed an agreement that would allow for the establishment of a pre-clearance customs and immigration facility within Central Station in Montreal. Before the Vermonter can be extended to Montreal the agreement must first be approved by Congress and the Parliament of Canada, and a preclearance facility must be constructed within Central Station.

On December 8, 2016, US President Barack Obama signed bipartisan legislation enabling US–Canada preclearance. On December 12, 2017, Canada's Governor General gave a royal assent to Bill C-23 enacted by Canada's House and Senate. The remaining hurdles to implementing the preclearance regime are an Order in Council in Canada, and a joint agreement between the two countries on construction of the facilities in Montreal and the service operating procedures.
