= National Railroad Passenger Corp. v. Boston & Maine Corp. =

National Railroad Passenger Corporation v. Boston & Maine Corp.
- Supreme Court of the United States

Argued January 13, 1992 Decided March 25, 1992
- Full case name: National Railroad Passenger Corporation v. Boston & Maine Corp.
- Citations: 503 U.S. 407 (more) 112 S. Ct. 1394; 118 L. Ed. 2d 52; 1992 U.S. LEXIS 1952

Holding
- Amtrak may condemn a railroad's trackage and convey it to another railroad to continue intercity passenger service; the Interstate Commerce Commission reasonably interpreted 45 U.S.C. § 562(d).

Court membership
- Chief Justice William Rehnquist Associate Justices Byron White · Harry Blackmun; John P. Stevens · Sandra Day O'Connor; Antonin Scalia · Anthony Kennedy; David Souter · Clarence Thomas

Case opinions
- Majority: Kennedy, joined by Rehnquist, Stevens, O'Connor, Scalia, Souter
- Dissent: White, joined by Blackmun, Thomas

Laws applied
- 45 U.S.C. § 562(d)

National Railroad Passenger Corporation v. Boston & Maine Corp., 503 U.S. 407 (1992), was a case in which the Supreme Court of the United States ruled that the National Railroad Passenger Corporation (better known as Amtrak), could condemn railroad property from Boston and Maine Railroad and convey it to another railroad in order to continue passenger rail service over that route.

== History ==
The Montrealer was originally a service of the Boston and Maine Railroad which used B&M's Connecticut River Line south of Vernon, Vermont to reach New York City. The NYC-Montréal portion of this route was continued under Amtrak.

The Montrealer was suspended from early April 1987 to mid-July 1989 because of deteriorating track conditions on the Boston and Maine Railroad, which had been taken over by Guilford Transportation. During the suspension, Amtrak offered "Ambus" service (operated by Vermont Transit).

To restore passenger rail service, Amtrak seized the section of the line between Windsor and Brattleboro by eminent domain. The track was rebuilt using federal funds and sold to the Central Vermont Railway. The train was reinstated in July 1989, continuing until 1995 on a modified route which used the Central Vermont Railway (now the New England Central Railroad) from East Northfield to New London, Connecticut.

The Supreme Court upheld Amtrak's action.
