= Connecticut River Railroad =

Overview
- Dates of operation: 1845–1893
- Successor: Boston and Maine Railroad

Technical
- Track gauge: 4 ft 8 1/2 in (1,435 mm) standard gauge

The Connecticut River Railroad was a railroad located along the Connecticut River in western Massachusetts, formed in 1845 from the merger of two unfinished railroads. Its main line from Springfield to East Northfield, Massachusetts, opened in stages between 1845 and 1849. It built several branches and over the years acquired additional lines in Vermont. The railroad was acquired by the Boston and Maine Railroad in 1893.

== History ==
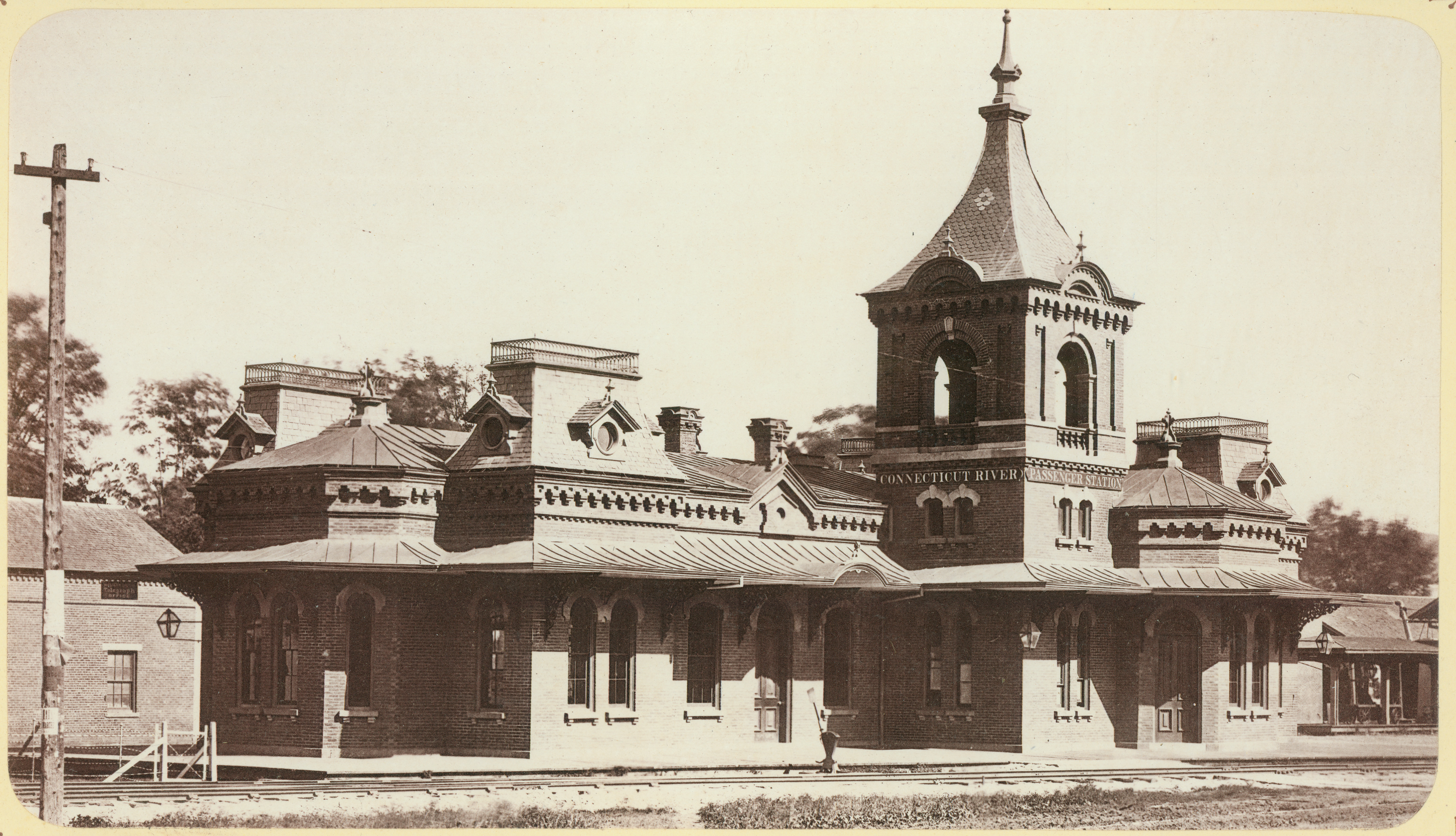
The former Connecticut River Railroad depot in Northampton, Massachusetts, ca. 1880s

The Connecticut River Railroad (CRRR) was formed in 1845 by the merger of the Northampton and Springfield Railroad (chartered in 1842) with the Greenfield and Northampton Railroad.

The CRRR first line opened between Springfield and Northampton in 1845 and by the following summer was extended to Deerfield, Massachusetts, and then to Greenfield in November 1846. In 1849, the line was extended further north to the Massachusetts-Vermont state line, where it met the Brattleboro line of the Vermont and Massachusetts Railroad (which later became part of the Fitchburg Railroad). This allowed the CRRR to provide rail service between Springfield, Massachusetts and Brattleboro, Vermont.

For over 40 years, the CRRR operated on its own and acquired a vast network of rail lines north of Brattleboro to Canada. These included New Hampshire's Ashuelot Railroad, which had been acquired in 1877, and the Connecticut and Passumpsic Rivers Railroad in northern Vermont, acquired in 1887. The days of independence came to an end when the Boston and Maine Railroad leased the CRRR in 1893. With a main line from Springfield, Massachusetts, north along the Connecticut River to the village of White River Junction, Vermont, the B&M became a major route between Montreal and New York City. The line was host to a mix of local and long-distance passenger and freight service. It became part of the route for crack New York–Montreal trains as early as the 1860s, and was acquired by the Boston and Maine Railroad in 1893.

Three branch lines were built off the CRRR, all of them in Massachusetts. The Chicopee Falls (1845), Easthampton (1872), and Deerfield (1906) branches were built and served the railroad until two of the three were abandoned by the Guilford Rail System (now Pan Am Railways). The Chicopee Falls line was abandoned in 1983, and the Easthampton line was abandoned in 1984. The Deerfield Branch is still in service, connecting the Connecticut River Line to large switching yards on the old Fitchburg line.

== See also ==
- Connecticut River Line
