= Ely station (Vermont) =

- Ely Railroad Depot
- U.S. National Register of Historic Places
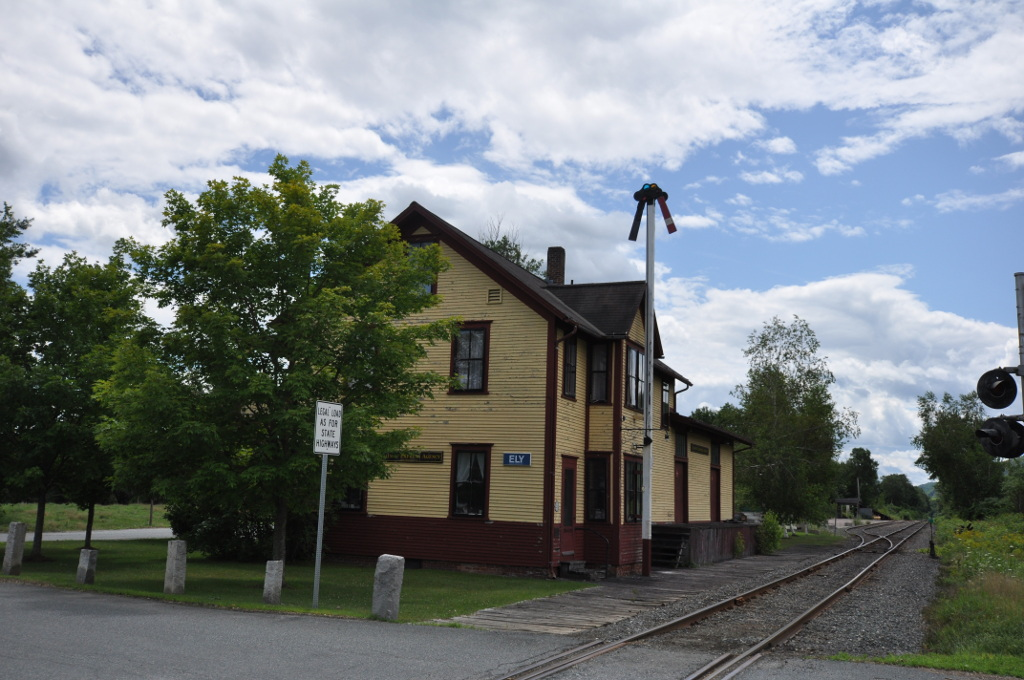

- Location within Vermont
- Location: Ely Rd. at Old Route 5, Fairlee, Vermont
- Coordinates: 43°52′24″N 72°10′40″W
- Area: 0.2 acres (0.081 ha)
- Built: 1900
- Built by: Boston & Maine Railroad
- NRHP reference No.: 94001448
- Added to NRHP: December 9, 1994

The Ely Railroad Depot is a historic railroad station at Ely Road and Old Route 5 in Fairlee, Vermont. Built in 1900 by the Boston and Maine Railroad, it is a well-preserved rural station, designed to house the stationmaster as well as providing station facilities. It was listed on the National Register of Historic Places in 1994.

== Description and history ==
The former Ely Depot stands in a rural area of southern Fairlee, on a triangular strip of land bordered on the west by the former railroad tracks of the Boston and Maine Railroad, and on the east by an old alignment of United States Route 5, which now roughly parallels the tracks just to their west. It is a 2-1/2 story wood frame structure, with a gabled roof and clapboard siding. On the track-facing side, a full-height section projects to a cross gable, which originally housed the telegrapher's booth. The east-facing facade has some brackets, evidence of a cantilevered porch that once projected from its second floor. An original semaphore mast stands near the building's northwest corner. The interior retains most of its original layout, which included a lobby, station office, and freight storage area, with a residential space on the second floor.

The railroad line passing through southern Fairlee was opened in 1848 by the Connecticut and Passumpsic River Railroad (C&PRR), and the station located here was originally known as Wares Crossing, after a local landowner. In 1865, Smith Ely, the owner of a mining operation in Vershire, purchased land for a freight forwarding and storage facility, since it was uneconomical to run a rail line toward his mines. The present building was constructed about 1900 by the Boston & Maine, the successor to the C&PRR, after the previous station was destroyed by fire. In the early decades of the 20th century, the station became a popular stop for vacationers en route to the growing summer camps of Lake Fairlee via the Day White Mountains, Night White Mountains and North Wind. The station was closed in the 1960s. In the 1970s the lobby and agent's office were used as a local post office.

== See also ==
- National Register of Historic Places listings in Orange County, Vermont
