= Union Station (Manchester, New Hampshire) =

Historical railway union station demolished in the 1960s

Coordinates: 42°59′08″N 71°27′58″W

Manchester
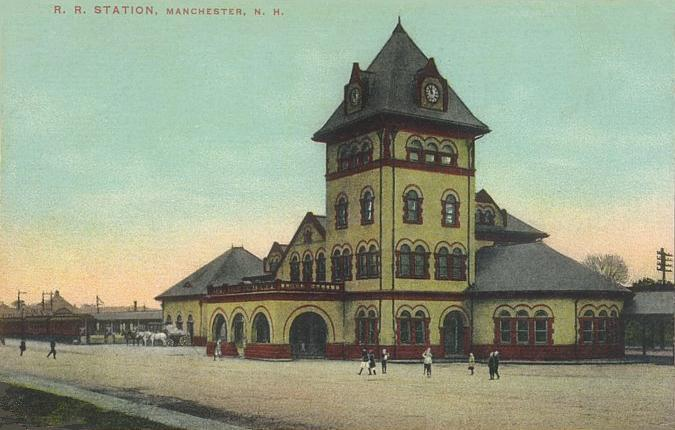
- Manchester Union Station, c. 1910

General information
- Location: Depot St. Manchester, New Hampshire
- Line: Boston and Maine Railroad

Key dates
- 1898 1950s 1962: opened closed demolished

Former services
Preceding station	MBTA	Following station
Concord Terminus	Lowell Line 1980–1981	Merrimack toward North Station
Preceding station	Boston and Maine Railroad	Following station
Amoskeag toward Concord, NH	Boston – Concord, NH	South Manchester toward Boston
Location

Manchester Union Station was a union station in Manchester, New Hampshire for passenger trains passing through the city. It was built in 1898, and by 1910 it was used only for Boston and Maine Railroad trains.

== Location ==
The station was situated a short distance east of the Merrimack River. It was at the foot of Depot Street, and was near the intersection of Canal and Granite streets.

== Passenger services ==
During the 1940s peak of railway travel, passenger service included these named trains:

- Ambassador and New Englander, a night train, Boston - Montreal, taking a route through Montpelier and Essex Falls in central Vermont
- Alouette and Red Wing, a night train, Boston - Montreal, taking a route through Wells River and St. Johnsbury in northern Vermont; in Newport, Vermont coach passengers on the Red Wing could change to the Connecticut Yankee, bound for Sherbrooke and Quebec City (a sleeping car splitting from the Red Wing directly hitched to the Connecticut Yankee)

It also served the State of Maine Express, a direct New York - Portland, Maine train that bypassed Boston, connecting in Lowell, Massachusetts.

The station served local trains to Boston via Methuen and Lawrence, Massachusetts, and trains north through Concord, Laconia and Plymouth to Woodsville. Additionally, it served east–west trains to Portsmouth on the Atlantic coast.

== Demise ==
By the end of the 1950s the number of trains had declined, with the unnamed remnant of the Ambassador being the only Montreal-bound train. The station was demolished in 1962. Yet a train still went through the city to White River Junction, Vermont, where connections could be made to the New Haven Railroad's Montrealer. And service continued through Manchester to Concord. Service in Manchester ended in 1967 with the discontinuing of the Boston-Concord train.

A brief stint in 1980-1981 from the MBTA led to a Lowell Line pilot service to the former station site, but when funding was pulled in 1981, service would be cut back to Lowell, permanently ending all passenger service to Manchester.
