= Cheshire (train) =

Passenger train in the United States

Overview
- Service type: Inter-city rail
- Status: Discontinued
- First service: December 10, 1944
- Last service: May 31, 1958
- Former operator: Boston and Maine Railroad

Route
- Termini: Boston North Station; White River Junction
- Service frequency: Daily
- Train numbers: 5505 and 5506

On-board services
- Seating arrangements: coaches

The Cheshire was a streamlined, express passenger train on the Boston and Maine Railroad's Cheshire Branch, connecting Boston with White River Junction, VT. It connected with the Rutland Railroad and Central Vermont in Bellows Falls, VT. Starting at Boston North Station, it ran to Fitchburg, MA, diverging from the Fitchburg Division in South Ashburnham, MA, and then through to Keene, NH, Bellows Falls, VT and White River Junction, VT.

== History ==
The train began service on December 10, 1944, replacing an unnamed train.

Travel time was approximately 3.5 hours in 1946. Initially, it used the Flying Yankee trainset although the service soon was suspended the following year until July 8. On August 28, 1945, the Flying Yankee was transferred to the Mountaineer but returned to the Cheshire Branch on October 15. While Flying Yankee trainset ran other routes, it spent the longest time on the Cheshire. In February 1951, a Budd Rail Diesel Car, dubbed Highliners by the B&M, performed a week-long test on the line and replaced the Flying Yankee by 1952. In December 1956, the Flying Yankee returned to the Cheshire route but retired on May 7, 1957, due to looming major maintenance needs. In October 1957, the Cheshire's route was curtailed to Bellows Falls and passengers bound for White River Junction had to transfer. On May 31, 1958, the Cheshire was discontinued along with all other passenger trains on the Cheshire Branch. The line was abandoned in the 1970 and has since been converted into the 42 mile long, Cheshire Rail Trail.
