= Ambassador (B&M train) =

American-Canadian passenger train (1926–1966)

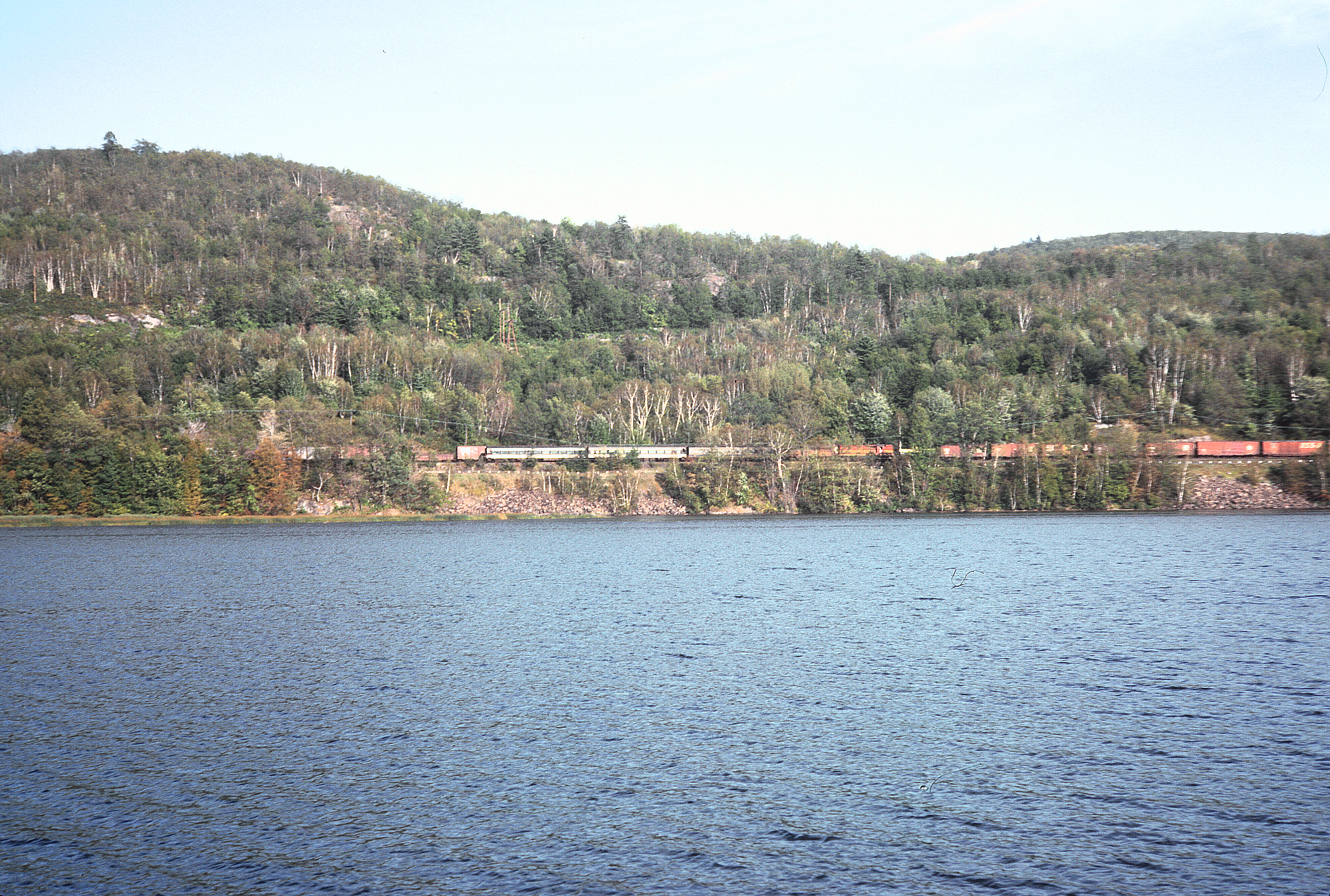
- The Ambassador in New Hampshire in September 1965

Overview
- Service type: Inter-city rail
- Status: Discontinued
- Locale: Northeastern United States/Quebec
- First service: April 26, 1926
- Last service: September 3, 1966
- Former operators: Boston & Maine; New York, New Haven and Hartford Railroad; Canadian National Railway; Central Vermont Railway

Route
- Termini: Boston, Massachusetts and New York City, New York; Montreal, Quebec
- Distance travelled: 327.2 miles (526.6 km) (1949) (Boston - Montreal)
- Average journey time: 9 hours, 25 minutes
- Service frequency: Daily
- Train numbers: 307 (northbound); 332 (southbound)

On-board services
- Seating arrangements: Coach seating
- Catering facilities: Cafe grill car, only Montreal to White River Junction (1949)
- Observation facilities: Parlor car

Technical
- Track gauge: 4 ft 8 1/2 in (1,435 mm)

The Ambassador was a passenger train that traveled from Boston, Massachusetts and New York City, New York to Montreal, Quebec. The train was jointly operated by the New York, New Haven and Hartford Railroad, Boston and Maine Railroad, the Central Vermont Railroad, and the Canadian National Railway. Beginning service on April 26, 1926, the Ambassador operated on a daytime schedule between Boston and Montreal, with coach, dining, and parlor cars in the consist. The route going north of White River Junction went northwest, through Montpelier and Essex Junction toward Montreal. There were also through cars to New York City offered until the mid-1950s, split from the Ambassador's consist in White River Junction, Vermont and added to the Connecticut Yankee train for points south. In its route from Boston's North Station it passed through Manchester (Union Station), Concord and Franklin in New Hampshire.

In 1956, with traffic declining, through service to Boston from Montreal was terminated, replaced with a transfer to Boston and Maine rail diesel cars at White River Junction, and the Ambassador name was applied to the Montreal—New York City train, which by 1958 lost food service and consisted only of coaches. On September 3, 1966, the Ambassador was discontinued after its operators sought and received approval from the Interstate Commerce Commission to terminate service.
