= Union Station (Troy, New York) =

Former passenger railway station in Troy, New York

Troy
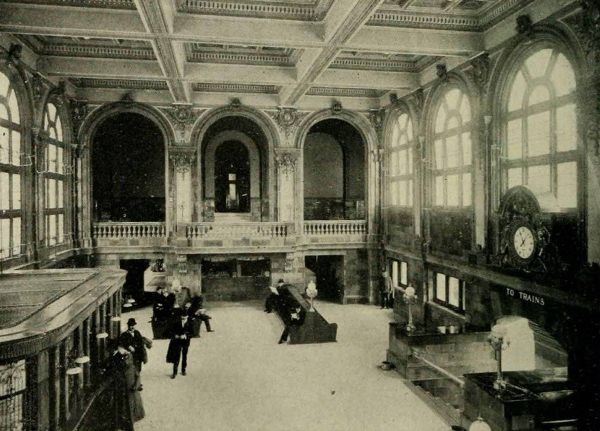
- Troy's Union Depot c. 1911

General information
- Location: 1801 6th Avenue, Troy, New York
- Coordinates: 42.7316°N 73.6867°W
- Platforms: 1 side platform, 3 island platforms
- Tracks: 7
- Train operators: Boston and Maine Railroad; Delaware and Hudson Railway; New York Central Railroad

Other information
- Status: Closed

History
- Opened: 1903
- Closed: 1958

Former services
Preceding station	Boston and Maine Railroad	Following station
Terminus	Boston – Troy	Lansingburgh toward Boston
Preceding station	Delaware and Hudson Railway	Following station
River Street toward Albany	Albany – Troy via Colonie	Terminus
Adams Street toward Albany	Albany – Troy via Rensselaer	Terminus
Preceding station	New York Central Railroad	Following station
Green Island toward Schenectady	Schenectady – Troy	Terminus
Albany Terminus	Albany – Troy	Terminus
Preceding station	Rutland Railroad	Following station
North Bennington toward Montreal	Green Mountain Flyer / Mount Royal	through to New York City via New York Central
Location

Union Station was the main passenger railroad station of Troy, New York until it went out of service in 1958. A Beaux-Arts building, designed by Reed & Stem and completed ca. 1903, it served the New York Central Railroad (NYC), the Boston and Maine Railroad (B&M) and the Delaware and Hudson Railroad (D&H). This was the fourth union station in Troy. The tracks approaching the station were but feet away from homes. It stretched from Broadway to Fulton streets, on the block east of Union Street.

The New York Central use, by mid-20th Century, was mainly for conveying trains from the territory to other routes, carried by other companies. Thus, the D&H's Laurentian and Montreal Limited moved from NYC tracks to D&H tracks when leaving north from the station, toward their Montreal destination. Until 1953, the Rutland Railroad ran the Green Mountain Flyer and the Mount Royal from New York City, then moved at Troy onto B&M tracks, for eventual completion of their trip on Rutland Railroad track (also bound for Montreal).

The Boston & Maine ran the Minute Man from Troy Union Station to Boston's North Station. This train passed through the famed Hoosac Tunnel near North Adams and specialized in serving northwestern and north-central Massachusetts. The cutting of the Minute Man back to Greenfield, Massachusetts in January 1958 precipitated the closure of the station that year. The station was demolished later that year.
