= Minute Man =

Former passenger train in the United States

Overview
- Service type: Inter-city rail
- Status: Discontinued
- First service: May 15, 1926
- Last service: January 18, 1958
- Former operator: Boston and Maine Railroad

Route
- Termini: Boston North Station; Troy
- Service frequency: Daily
- Train numbers: 58 (northbound), 59 (southbound)

On-board services
- Seating arrangements: coaches
- Sleeping arrangements: Pullman
- Catering facilities: Dining car and parlor car

The Minute Man was a passenger train operated by the Boston and Maine Railroad between Boston, Massachusetts, and Troy, New York. It was the railroad's flagship train on the Fitchburg Division and offered through cars with the New York Central Railroad for service to points west. The Minute Man was introduced in 1926 and discontinued in 1958.

== History ==
The train debuted on May 15, 1926, with a travel time of about five hours between Boston and Troy. It connected with the Lake Shore Limited of the New York Central Railroad at Albany. The train quickly attracted new ridership to the route. Serving as the flagship train on the Fitchburg Division, B&M management promoted the train's convenience to reach Chicago without having to change stations in Boston. (Unlike Boston and Albany Railroad trains, which used South Station, the Minute Man connected with other B&M service at North Station.) The train included Pullman sleeping and parlor cars, coach cars, and dining cars. Parlor car passengers could use an open-platform observation car until World War II.

The through sleeper exchanged with the New York Central ended on December 1, 1946. Eastbound scheduling issues and low patronage led the B&M to drop the service. The new schedule allowed for improved local service along the line. The Minute Man was originally a conventional, locomotive-hauled train using heavyweight and American Flyer coaches. The Flying Yankee trainset was used on the route from April 1952 to April 1955. Budd Rail Diesel Cars, dubbed Highliners by the B&M, replaced that trainset for a few weeks until it was permanently replaced in December 1956. The B&M discontinued service west of Williamstown, with the Minute Man replaced by an unnamed train on the remaining portion. Intercity service was cut back to Greenfield later than year and to Fitchburg in 1960, leaving only commuter service on the route.

Amtrak used the Minute Man name for a Boston–Philadelphia train from June 11, 1972, to April 29, 1973, and a Boston–Washington train from 1973 to 1995.
