= Windsor station (Vermont) =

Rail station in Windsor, Vermont, US

Windsor, VT
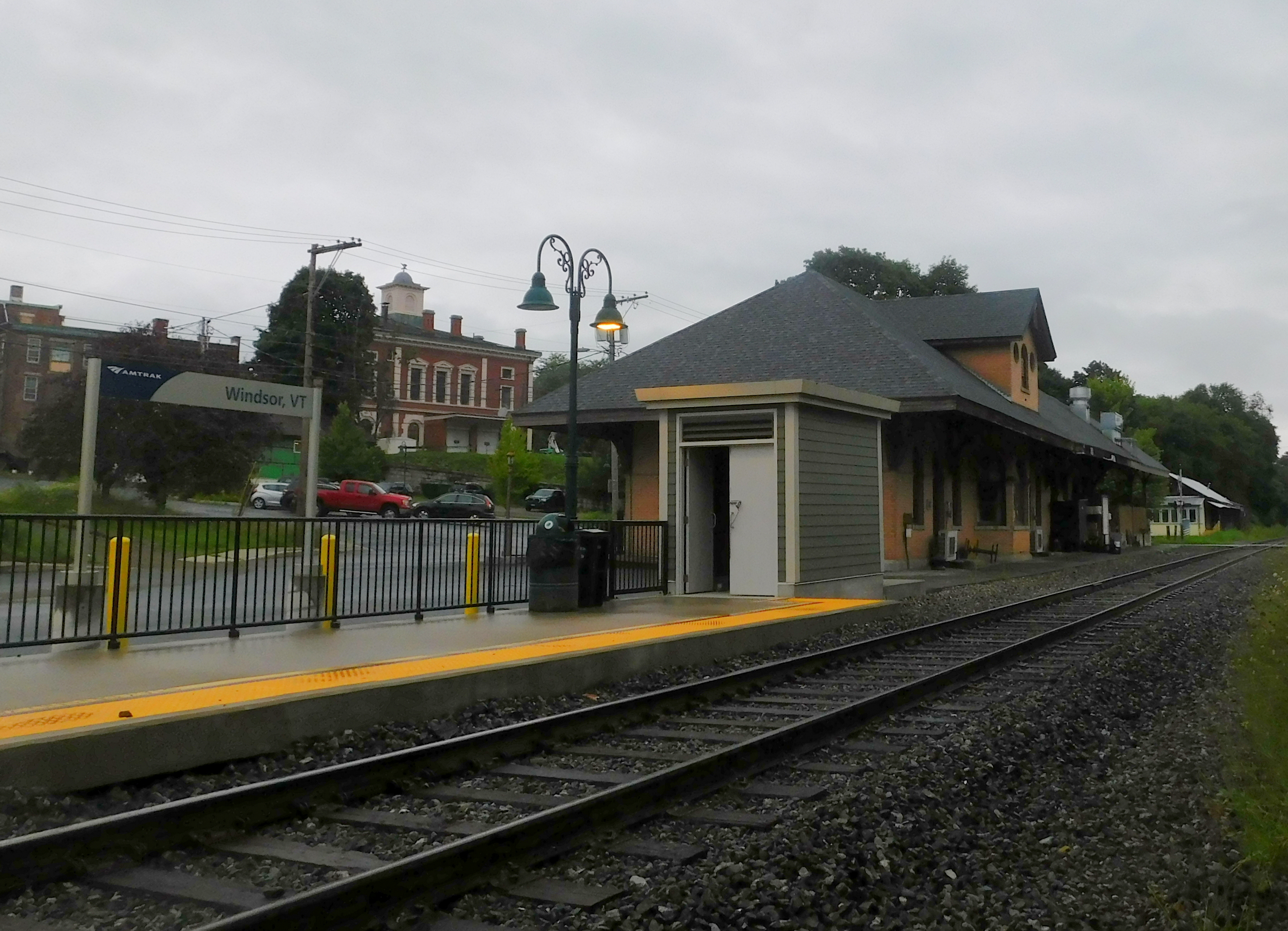
- Windsor station in August 2023.

General information
- Location: 26 Depot Avenue; Windsor, Vermont; United States
- Coordinates: 43.4801°N 72.3849°W
- Owner: N.L. Wilson Railways
- Line: New England Central Railroad
- Platforms: 1 side platform
- Tracks: 1

Construction
- Parking: Yes
- Accessible: Yes

Other information
- Station code: Amtrak: WNM

History
- Opened: January 31, 1849
- Rebuilt: June 16, 1901; 1996

Passengers
- FY 2025: 1,666 (Amtrak)

Services
Preceding station	Amtrak	Following station
Claremont toward Washington, D.C.	Vermonter	White River Junction toward St. Albans
Former services
Preceding station	Central Vermont Railway	Following station
Claremont Junction toward New London	Main Line	Hartland toward St. Johns
Location

Windsor station, also known as Windsor–Mt. Ascutney, is an Amtrak intercity train station in Windsor, Vermont currently served by the Vermonter train over the New England Central Railroad line tracks.

The station building is owned by Stacy and Jon Capurso who operate the Windsor Station Restaurant & Barroom there.

== History ==
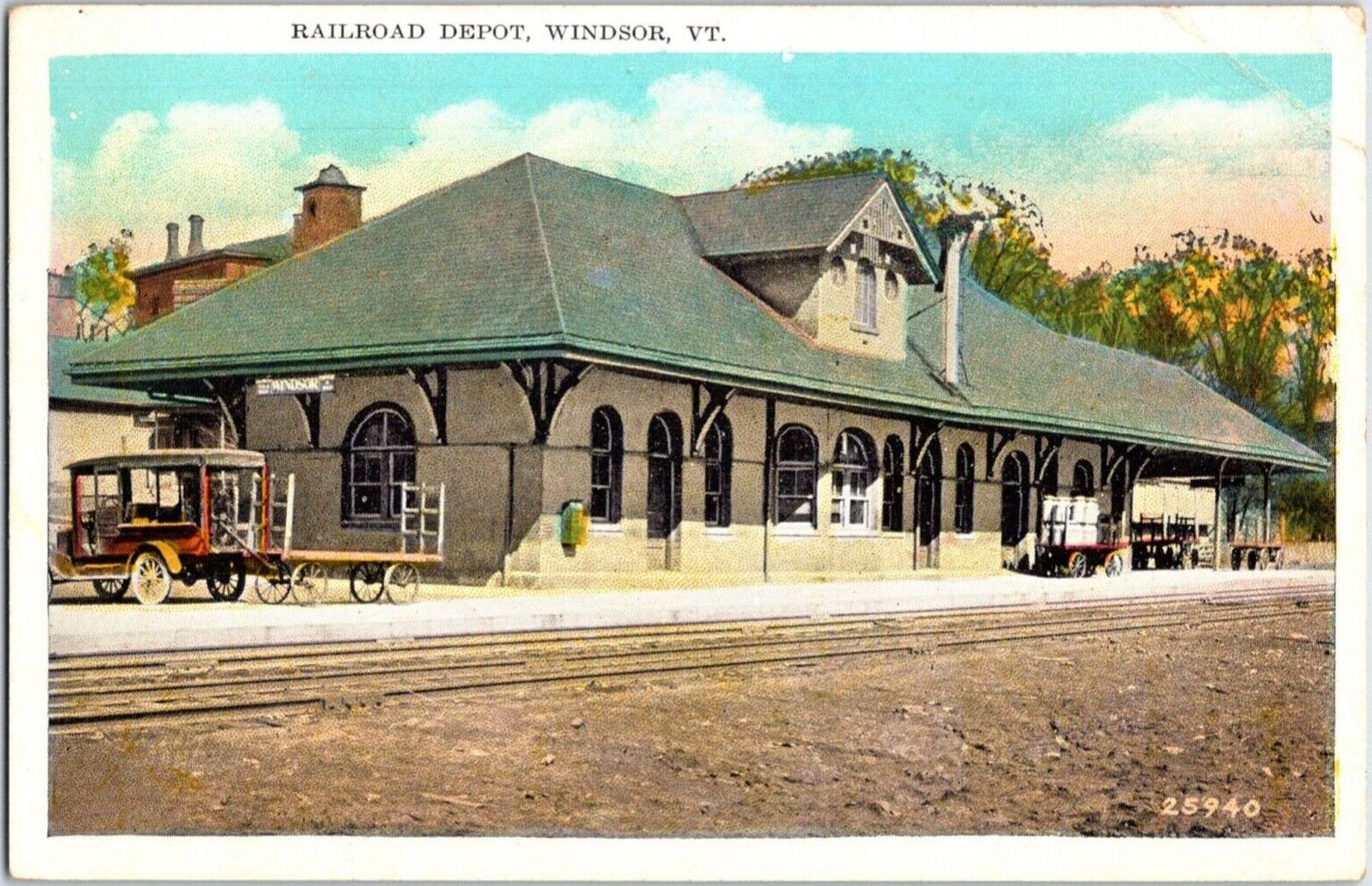
Circa-1920s postcard of the station

As the first town in Vermont to break ground for the railroad, Windsor briefly leaped to the forefront of mid-19th century commercial development. Around the turn of the century, when Windsor's original 1849 railway station burned, the Burlington contractors Mason & Co. were hired to build "a good type of a modern Railway Station...after the standard design of the Central Vermont Railway Company." Complete with electric lights throughout, a modern hot water heater, birch veneer side seating, and separate waiting rooms for men and women, the new station was to cost about $10,000 and be completed by January 1, 1901.

Like many railway stations erected during this period, the Central Vermont's standard design combined function with style. The low hipped roof (a Romanesque feature) extends beyond the wall surface creating a large over-hang to shelter a waiting platform. Decorative brackets and columns support the roof and round arched windows and doors penetrate the four façades, typical of the style. The verge or barge board, a wooden ornamental motif along the eaves, was borrowed from the Gothic Revival style, a contemporary of the Romanesque. Many of the original materials used to build the station remain intact, such as the yellow pine interior sheathing, buff pressed brick, and window and door sills of Barre granite. The sounds and vibrations of the train rushing down the tracks completes this preserved early 20th century environment.

== Architecture ==
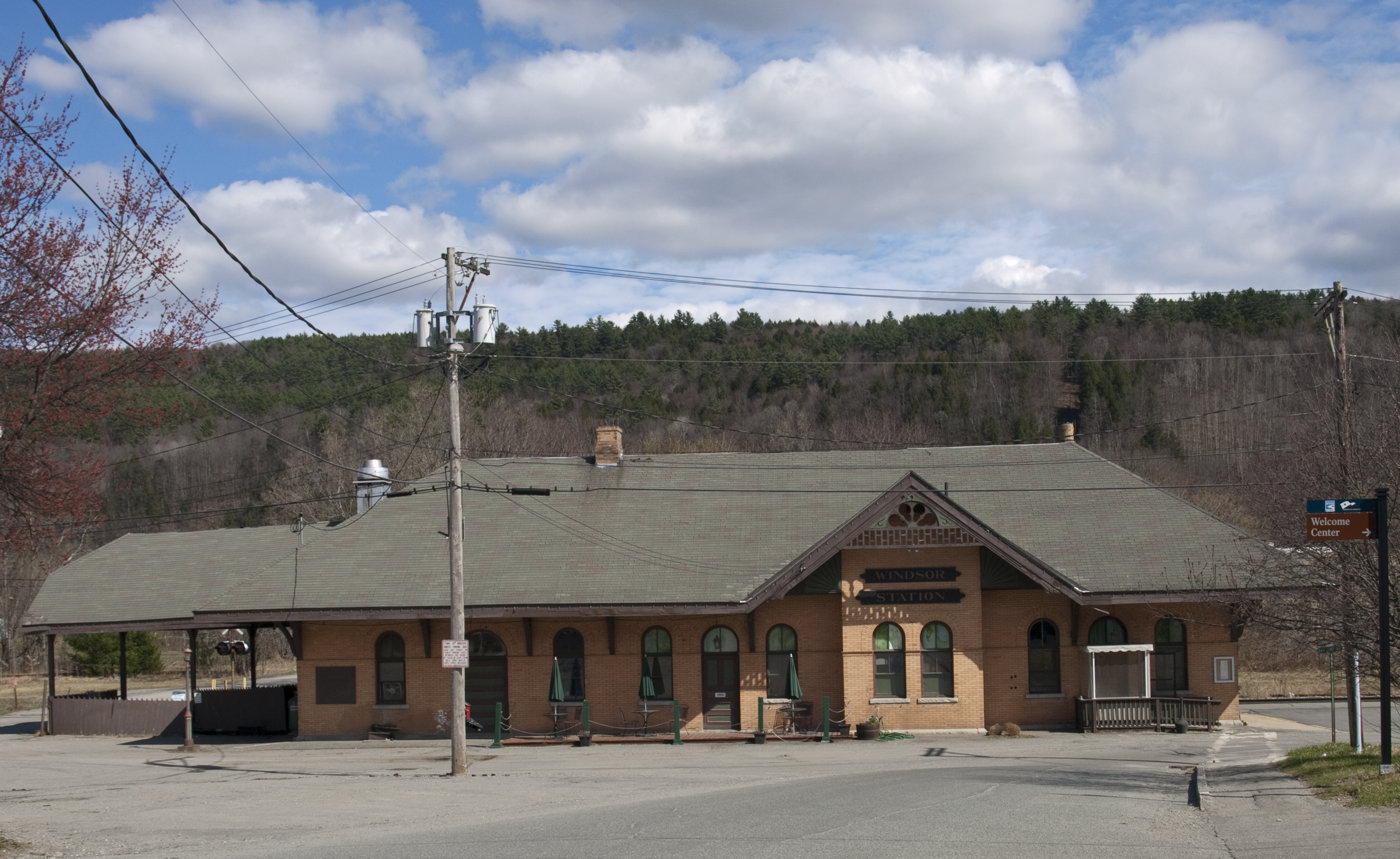
The station building

A 1-1/2 story building of brick construction, the station's long, rectangular form is dominated by an expansive hip roof which overhangs the walls 6-1/2 feet and is supported by bracketed, wood outriggers. The west (front) and east (trackside) elevations are punctuated by round-arched fenestration, three doors with flanking windows on the east and alternating doors and windows on the west. Near the south end of the west facade, the eaves line of the hip roof is broken by a projecting gable with decorative infill in the peak which covers a projecting pavilion with a pair of round-arched windows. On the east elevation in a corresponding position a station agent's office projects in a similar fashion but also projects through the hip roof, without breaking the line of the eaves, and terminates in the form of a gable-roofed dormer. The building's round-arched fenestration is visually tied together by belt course slightly below impost level.

== Reuse ==
Since 1976, a number of restaurants have occupied the building. In 2008, NL Wilson purchased the building and business—and operated as Windsor Station Pub until October 2011. In April 2013, Jonathan and Stacy Capurso purchased the empty building and began a full restoration and upgrade. They currently operate The Windsor Station Restaurant & Barroom.
