= Green Mountain Flyer =

American-Canadian named passenger train (1892–1953)

Overview
- Service type: Inter-city rail
- Status: discontinued
- Locale: Northeastern United States/Quebec, Canada
- First service: 1892
- Last service: 1953
- Successor: Ethan Allen Express (partial)
- Former operators: Rutland Railroad; New York Central Railroad; Boston & Maine Railroad; Canadian National Railway

Route
- Termini: New York, New York; Montreal, Quebec
- Distance travelled: 391.4 miles (629.9 km)
- Service frequency: Daily
- Train numbers: 65 (northbound), 64 (southbound)

On-board services
- Seating arrangements: coach
- Catering facilities: dining car

The Green Mountain Flyer was an international day train between Montreal, Quebec, Canada, and the Northeast United States, with sections to New York City and Boston. It was operated in cooperation between the Rutland Railroad, the Canadian National Railway, and the New York Central Railroad. The train carried the number 65 running north and number 64 running south. The Mount Royal (#51 north, #52 south) was the night train counterpart to the Green Mountain Flyer. Following years of cutbacks, both trains were discontinued in 1953 when the Rutland Railway ended all passenger service.

== History ==
=== Route ===
The train's route, running south, began in Canadian National Railway territory from Montreal Central Station to the Canada–United States border at Rouses Point, New York. After traversing the islands of Lake Champlain and the Colchester Causeway, the trains served Burlington, Vermont, at its Union Station. Both trains had second-sections that split at Rutland, Vermont, and continued through on Rutland Railroad trackage to Bellows Falls, Vermont, where they followed Boston & Maine Railroad trackage through Keene, New Hampshire and Fitchburg, Massachusetts to Boston, Massachusetts's North Station.

The main route continued from Rutland to North Bennington; to Troy, New York; then along the New York Central Hudson Division and Electric Division into Grand Central Terminal in New York City.

=== Demise ===
On September 29, 1951, the Green Mountain Flyer was cut back to Burlington, leaving only the Mount Royal serving Montreal. On April 27, 1952, the northbound New York section of the Green Mountain Flyer was moved four hours later. The northbound Boston section was combined with a local train north of Rutland and operated separately from the New York section. Southbound, the New York and Boston sections continued to run combined from Burlington to Rutland. A strike on June 26, 1953, ended all Rutland Railway passenger service, including the Green Mountain Flyer and the Mount Royal. With the discontinuation of these trains, direct train service into Burlington ended.

=== Later service ===
Since 1974, Montreal–New York train service has been provided by Amtrak's Adirondack, the successor to a one-time Green Mountain Flyer competitor, the Laurentian. The Adirondack takes a more westerly route between Rouses Point and Hudson that bypasses Vermont.

In 2022 the Vermont Agency of Transportation (VTrans) and Amtrak extended the Ethan Allen Express from Rutland to Burlington over the line formerly used by the Green Mountain Flyer, restoring Burlington–New York service. VTrans has also proposed adding a second Burlington–New York train via North Bennington and Manchester that would more closely match the former route of the Green Mountain Flyer.

As of 2022 there remains no direct passenger rail service between Montreal and Boston.
