= North Wind =

Former passenger train in the United States

Overview
- Service type: Inter-city rail
- Status: Discontinued
- First service: 1946
- Last service: September 11, 1956
- Former operators: New Haven Railroad; Boston and Maine Railroad

Route
- Termini: New York City, New York's Grand Central Terminal; Bretton Woods, New Hampshire
- Distance travelled: 335 miles (539 km)
- Average journey time: 9 hours
- Service frequency: Daily summer only
- Train numbers: 75 (northbound), 70 (southbound)

On-board services
- Seating arrangements: coaches
- Catering facilities: Dining car and parlor car

The North Wind was a summer passenger train between New York City, New York and resorts in New Hampshire's White Mountains (New England). Travel time was about 9 hours over the 331-mile (533 km) route to Bretton Woods, New Hampshire. The route went via the New Haven Railroad from New York City, New York to Springfield, Massachusetts, where it left the New Haven–Springfield Line to reach the Boston and Maine Railroad at Springfield, Massachusetts, continuing northward to White River Junction, Vermont, Whitefield, New Hampshire and finally Bretton Woods, New Hampshire.

== History ==
The North Wind was a fast, daytime train intended to lure vacationers to the White Mountains. It operated with fewer stops than the Day White Mountains (14 versus 30) so as to offer a more competitive travel time with driving. It was considered the premier train serving the New York City to White Mountains route and offered parlor seats for its entire route as well as a dining car as far as Bellows Falls or White River Junction. Initially in 1946, the train provided gratifying results according to B&M management. For the summer of 1949, the northern terminus was extended from Whitefield, New Hampshire to Bretton Woods, New Hampshire. Starting in 1950, it was combined with the Day White Mountains train from New York City to Springfield with that train making more stops north of Springfield and terminating in Groveton, New Hampshire. For the 1956 season, it ran combined with the Day White Mountains as far as White River Junction in an effort reduce passenger train expenses under the newly arrived president, Patrick McGinnis. The train was discontinued after the 1956 season.
