= Mountaineer (B&M train) =

Former passenger train in the United States

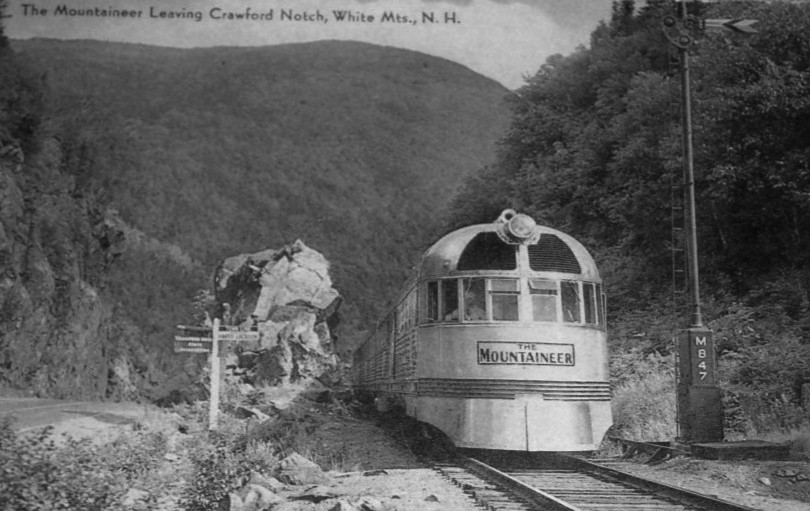
- Mountaineer train going through Crawford Notch

Overview
- Service type: Inter-city rail
- Status: Discontinued
- First service: 1940's
- Last service: 1961
- Former operators: Boston and Maine Railroad; Maine Central Railroad

Route
- Termini: Boston; Littleton, NH
- Service frequency: Daily summer only, weekends during some years

On-board services
- Seating arrangements: coaches
- Catering facilities: Dining car

The Mountaineer was a summer-only passenger train connecting Boston with Littleton, running via Dover, North Conway and Crawford Notch. The Mountaineer began service sometime in the 1940s, replacing an unnamed train. Like most summer trains, it was suspended during World War II, but resumed service in August 1945 and operated until 1961.

== History ==
Introduced to improve travel times to the White Mountains, it ran on the B&M between Boston and Intervale and then used the Maine Central's Mountain Division to Whitefield. In addition to attracting passengers via faster service, some passengers rode it for the scenery via Crawford Notch.

In August 1945, the Mountaineer resumed service after its wartime hiatus using the Flying Yankee trainset. By 1946, the train's popularity outstripped the Yankee's seating capacity and it was replaced with deluxe coaches, a parlor-diner car and a diesel locomotive. Diner service was dropped after 1947. In 1950, the Mountaineer switched from a daily service to a Friday through Monday schedule. Monday service was dropped in 1951 and Friday service was dropped in 1952. Budd Rail Diesel Car’s replaced the locomotive-hauled train in 1953 and daily service resumed. The train was modestly profitable that year despite operating with an engineer, conductor and trainman. In 1955, the Friday through Sunday schedule resumed. For the summer of 1956, the terminus was moved from Littleton to Intervale, eliminating the scenic run through Crawford Notch and ending service to the Mount Washington Hotel. For 1957, the terminus was moved to North Conway to allow the train to run with one RDC car as two cars were required to trip Maine Central Railroad's signals. By early 1960, the B&M proposed removing one of the three crewmembers but discontinued the service after the two railroad unions objected. Service was restored by April after the New Hampshire Public Utilities Commission ordered its restoration with two crew. This arrangement was short-lived as by December 1961, that passenger train was discontinued on the Conway Branch.
