= Night White Mountains =

Boston and Maine Railroad train

Overview
- Service type: Inter-city rail
- Status: Discontinued
- Locale: Northeastern United States/Quebec
- First service: 1926
- Last service: 1956
- Former operators: Boston & Maine; New Haven Railroad

Route
- Termini: New York City; Bretton Woods, New Hampshire
- Service frequency: Daily seasonal, weekend only in later years

On-board services
- Seating arrangements: Coach
- Sleeping arrangements: Pullman
- Catering facilities: Buffet parlor car

Technical
- Track gauge: 4 ft 8 1/2 in (1,435 mm)

The Night White Mountains was a summer-only overnight passenger train jointly operated by the Boston and Maine Railroad and the New Haven Railroad between Bretton Woods, New Hampshire, and New York City, New York. Its primary purpose was to connect vacationers from New York City to New Hampshire's White Mountains including the Mount Washington Hotel and Mount Washington Cog Railway.

Initially named the Night White Mountains Express, it was the most exclusive of seasonal trains serving the White Mountains. It was briefly an all-Pullman service before World War II. After the war, coaches were added and it became a weekend only service. While it offered mostly open section sleeping compartments immediately after the war, it transitioned to mostly private rooms to better match the tastes of its exclusive clientele. It used heavyweight sleeping cars and even offered Pullman through coaches to Washington, DC. Its 1955 consist offered berths, roomettes, double roomettes and bedrooms and a buffet-lounge car.
