= State of Maine Express =

State of Maine
Overview
- Service type: Inter-city rail
- Status: Discontinued
- Locale: Northeastern United States
- First service: 1913
- Last service: October 29, 1960
- Former operators: New Haven Railroad; Boston and Albany Railroad; Boston and Maine Railroad

Route
- Termini: New York City; Portland
- Average journey time: 9 hours 45 minutes
- Service frequency: Daily (except Saturdays)
- Train number: northbound: 81, southbound: 82, later 88

On-board services
- Seating arrangements: coach
- Sleeping arrangements: sections, roomettes, single and double bedrooms, compartments
- Catering facilities: Dining car

The State of Maine was an overnight passenger train between New York City and Portland, Maine, that was operated jointly for more than 50 years by the Boston and Maine Railroad and the New York, New Haven and Hartford Railroad. It departed New York's Pennsylvania Station at 9:00 p.m. and arrived at 6:45 a.m. at Portland's Union Station, where connections were available on Maine Central Railroad trains to most Maine locations. It ended service in October 1960, the last direct passenger rail service between New Hampshire or Maine and New York City.

It was the only New York City-to-Maine train to operate year-round.

== Route ==
As with most trains between New York and Maine, the State of Maine bypassed Boston, which lacks a north-south rail connection. Travel was over the New Haven Railroad (now Amtrak's Northeast Corridor) from New York Penn Station to Providence, Rhode Island, where trains left the Northeast Corridor to reach the Boston and Maine Railroad in Worcester, Massachusetts, via the Providence and Worcester Railroad. After Worcester, trains continued over the Boston & Maine to Portland.

Service began in 1913, using the Boston and Albany Railroad between Springfield, Massachusetts, and Worcester. After the mid-1920s, trains used New Haven tracks from Groton, Connecticut, through Putnam in eastern Connecticut to Worcester. After World War II, the eastern-Connecticut shortcut was abandoned and the train was routed through Providence to Worcester.

== Equipment ==
The core service was through sleeping cars between New York and Portland. One of these sleeping cars was sometimes carried on connecting Maine Central trains to or from Bangor, Maine, or points near the Maine coast. Coaches were also carried. As the last Maine passenger train with connections south of Boston, the State of Maine carried increasing numbers of express and mail cars during the declining years of passenger service.

The State of Maine also carried through sleeping cars between New York and Concord, New Hampshire, until 1958, and New York and Plymouth, New Hampshire. These cars were left at Lowell, Massachusetts, for northbound Trains 1 (for Plymouth,) and 303 (for Concord) to bring to their final destination. Southbound Train 24 collected cars from both Plymouth and Concord, dropping them again in Lowell to be added to the State of Maine consist.

From delivery of stainless steel sleeping cars to Boston & Maine and New Haven in 1954 until service ended on October 29, 1960, the train north of Worcester typically required a pair of Boston & Maine or Maine Central EMD E7s to pull a long string of head-end cars followed by a single stainless steel New Haven coach and a single stainless steel sleeping car. Many of the head-end cars were former troop sleepers converted to baggage cars. Most were New Haven and Boston & Maine cars, with a few from the Pennsylvania Railroad and the New York Central Railroad. Many resort owners operated both a summer resort in Maine and a winter resort in Florida. These individuals required newspapers from each location; and those newspapers were often carried in baggage cars of the Maine Central, Atlantic Coast Line Railroad or Florida East Coast Railway.
