= Alouette (train) =

American-Canadian passenger train (1926–1956)

- The Buffet/Parlor car of the Alouette with brass observation deck

Overview
- Service type: Inter-city rail
- Status: Discontinued
- Locale: Northeastern United States/Quebec
- First service: April 26, 1926
- Last service: 1956 (Named Service) April, 1965 (Boston & Maine Cooperation) October, 1965 (Remaining Service)
- Former operators: Boston & Maine; Canadian Pacific Railway

Route
- Termini: North Station, Boston, Massachusetts (until April, 1965); Wells River, Vermont Windsor Station, Montreal, Quebec
- Distance travelled: 338.7 miles (545.1 km) (1949)
- Average journey time: 10 hours, 40 minutes (northbound); 10 hours, 15 minutes (southbound)
- Service frequency: Daily
- Train numbers: 5 (B&M), 211 (CP) (northbound); 20 (B&M), 212 (CP) (southbound)

On-board services
- Seating arrangements: Coach seating
- Catering facilities: Buffet parlor car, only north of Wells River, VT, along the Canadian Pacific section (1949)
- Observation facilities: Observation Car north of Wells River, VT

Technical
- Track gauge: 4 ft 8 1/2 in (1,435 mm)

The Alouette was a passenger train jointly operated by the Boston and Maine Railroad and the Canadian Pacific Railway between Montreal, Quebec and Boston, Massachusetts.

== History & Route ==
=== Early History ===
The Alouette began service on April 26, 1926, operating on a daytime schedule with coach and parlor car service. At Newport, Vermont passengers could transfer to Quebec Central Railway trains bound for Sherbrooke and Quebec City. For passengers originating from Boston on the night train counterpart north, the Red Wing (#325/#302), the train would join with the New York-Quebec City Connecticut Yankee to complete the trip to Quebec City.

The Alouette service led by a 4-6-2 engine with a 4-6-0 helper during the North American Blizzard of 1947. Newport, Vermont.

Until late 1954, the train operated over Canadian Pacific trackage to Wells River, Vermont, where it entered the Boston and Maine for the remainder of the way to Boston via Plymouth, New Hampshire and Concord, New Hampshire on the division that the B&M had acquired with the purchase of the Concord and Montreal Railroad in 1895. After the Boston and Maine abandoned its trackage north of Plymouth, the train was rerouted via White River Junction, Vermont. The train continued to travel via Wells River, St. Johnsbury and Newport, Vermont, before completing the trip to Vermont.

=== Demise ===
In 1956, the Alouette switched to using Budd Rail Diesel Cars, eliminating the buffet-parlor car. The train lost its name and its original number and became #31 north and #32 south and it no longer had food concession service. The overnight Red Wing was numbered #29/#30 and retained its sleeping cars and only offered breakfast exclusively to its sleeping car passengers.

=== End of Service ===
The overnight Red Wing had its last run on October 24, 1959. From April 25, 1965, the Boston & Maine pulled out of its cooperation, and the Alouette successor #31/32 only operated on the Canadian Pacific Railway's Montreal to Wells River, Vermont segment. That remaining segment ended service on October 30, 1965. This ended a tradition of Boston to Montreal trains, dating back to 1887.

== Route ==
The Alouette and Concord Local under B&M Train Shed. Concord, New Hampshire.
