= Flying Yankee =

American trainset

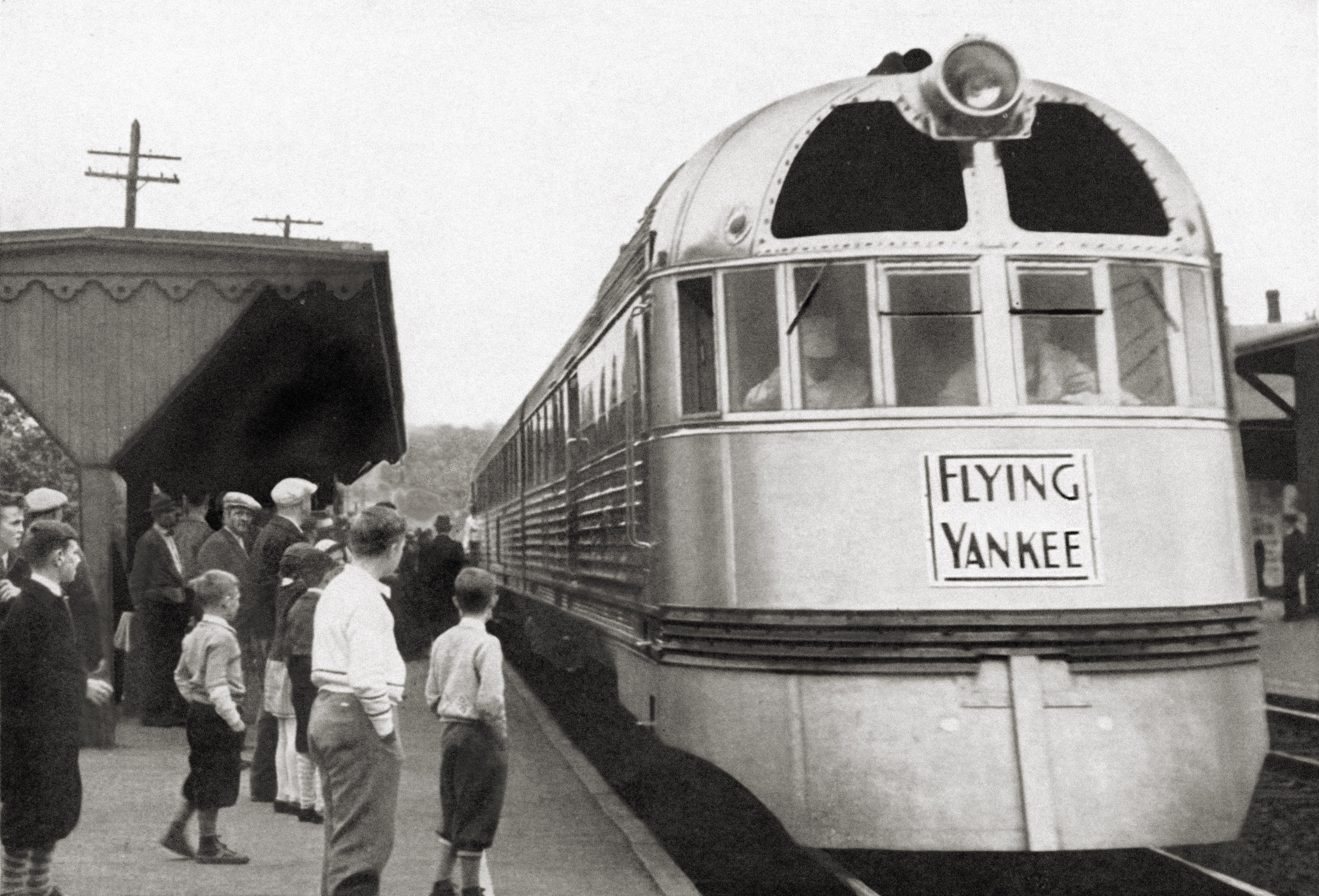
Type and origin
- Power type: Diesel
- Builder: Budd Company and Electro-Motive Corporation
- Model: BM-MEC 6000
- Build date: 1935
- Total produced: 1
Specifications
- Configuration
  - AAR: B-2
- Gauge: 4 ft 8 1/2 in (1,435 mm) standard gauge
- Bogies: Jacobs
- Prime mover: Winton 201-A
- Engine type: Diesel
- Cylinders: 8
Career
- Operators: Boston and Maine Railroad
- Locale: North America
- Delivered: February 1935
- Last run: May 7, 1957
- Retired: 1957
- Current owner: Flying Yankee Association
- Disposition: Undergoing restoration to operating condition

Flying Yankee
Overview
- Service type: Inter-city rail
- Status: Discontinued
- Locale: New England
- First service: 1935
- Last service: 1957
- Former operators: Boston and Maine Railroad; Maine Central Railroad

Route
- Termini: North Station; Bangor Union Station
- Distance travelled: 254 miles (409 km)
- Average journey time: 5.5-6 hours
- Service frequency: Daily except Sunday
- Train numbers: Northbound: 15; Southbound: 16

On-board services
- Seating arrangements: Streamline coaches (1954)
- Catering facilities: Restaurant lounge car, catering by The Armstrong Company

Technical
- Track gauge: 4 ft 8 1/2 in (1,435 mm)

The Flying Yankee is a diesel-electric streamliner built in 1935 for the Boston and Maine Railroad by Budd Company and with mechanical and electrical equipment from Electro-Motive Corporation. It was the third streamliner train in North America. That train ceased passenger service in 1957 and is stored at the Conway Scenic Railroad in New Hampshire. It was owned by the state of New Hampshire, until it was purchased by the Flying Yankee Association after being selected by the state of New Hampshire to receive ownership of the diesel streamliner. In May of 2025 the trainset was added to the New Hampshire State Register of Historic Places by the states preservation office.

== History ==
Prior to 1935, the name Flying Yankee referred to a passenger train that ran between Bangor, Maine, and Boston, Massachusetts, at least back to 1891. The train was hauled by an early 4-6-2 steam locomotive; cars were standard heavyweight construction.

The new Flying Yankee in the 1930s was a lightweight train constructed with welded stainless steel using Budd's patented process. The engine was an 8-cylinder Winton 201-A diesel, driving a generator; the lead truck was equipped with traction motors. It was fitted with air conditioning in all cars. No dining car was provided; instead, meals were prepared in a galley and served to passengers in trays that clipped to the back of the seat in front.

It was the third streamliner in service after the Union Pacific's M-10000 and the Chicago, Burlington and Quincy Railroad's Pioneer Zephyr. The Flying Yankee was a virtual clone of the latter, except that it dispensed with the baggage/mail space to seat 142 in three articulated cars.

The train was delivered in February 1935, and toured the BM-MEC railroad system before entering service on April 1. The daily route served began in Portland, then to Boston, followed by a return to Portland and continuing to Bangor, Maine, returning through Portland to Boston and finally returning to Portland late in the day, a distance of 750 miles (1,210 km) per day. This schedule was kept six days a week; the trainset spent Sundays undergoing maintenance. The train proved extremely successful, attracting new ridership and earning a profit for its owners.

Later on, as newer equipment replaced it on one route, it would be switched to other routes, bearing the names Cheshire, Minute Man, Mountaineer, and Business Man.

As railroad passenger ridership declined in the 1950s, the Yankee was also getting old, and thus the trainset, as The Minuteman, was retired, running its last on May 7, 1957.

Most of the train's route is currently operated by Amtrak's Downeaster, which runs as far north as Brunswick, Maine.

=== Current location ===
The railroad donated the trainset to the Edaville Railroad tourist/museum operation in Carver, Massachusetts, in 1957. The train remained on static display there until it was moved in 1993 to Glen, New Hampshire, after being purchased by Bob Morrell, then-owner of Story Land.

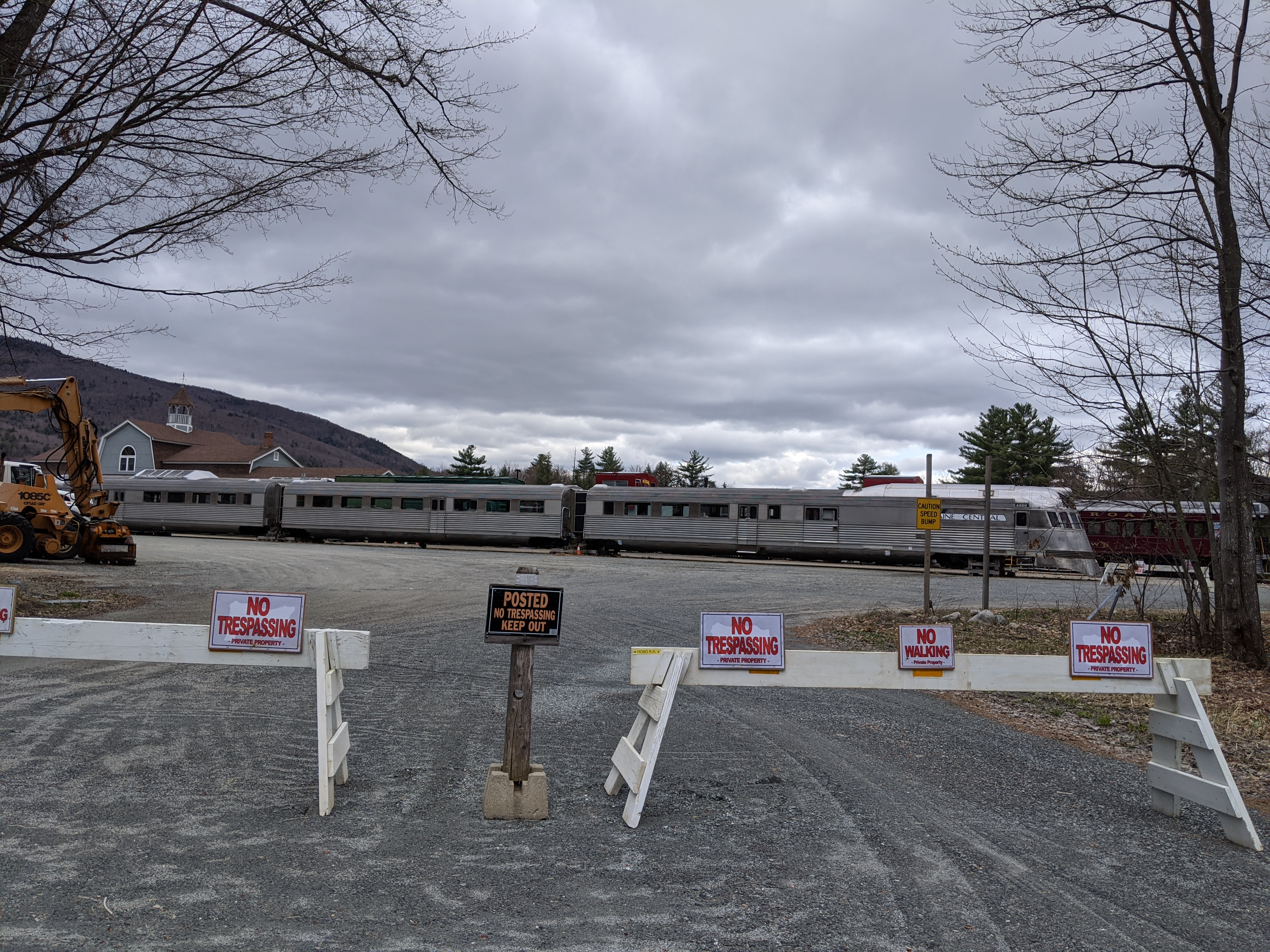
The Flying Yankee sitting at the Hobo Railroad in 2020, with its trucks removed

In 1997, the train was moved to the Concord and Claremont Railroad shops in Claremont, New Hampshire, for a restoration after it was purchased by the state of New Hampshire. By 2004, the major structural restoration had been completed, and detailed restoration of components is ongoing with the goal of restoring the train completely to running condition. The train was moved on August 10, 2005, to the Hobo Railroad in Lincoln, New Hampshire.

Plans to move it to Concord, New Hampshire, site of a former Boston and Maine railyard, fell through in 2017. In November 2023, the state of New Hampshire put the equipment up for sale, with a focus on "the relocation and encouraged restoration" of the trainset. In April 2024, the trainset was sold to the Flying Yankee Association, who hopes to restore and operate the set in the Mount Washington Valley, with a possibility of running it on the Conway Scenic Railroad. It was moved to Conway on July 30, 2024, where it is currently undergoing restoration.

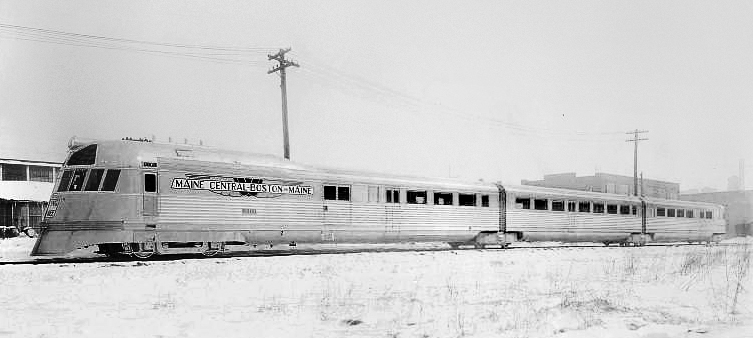
Budd company photo of the train in January 1935

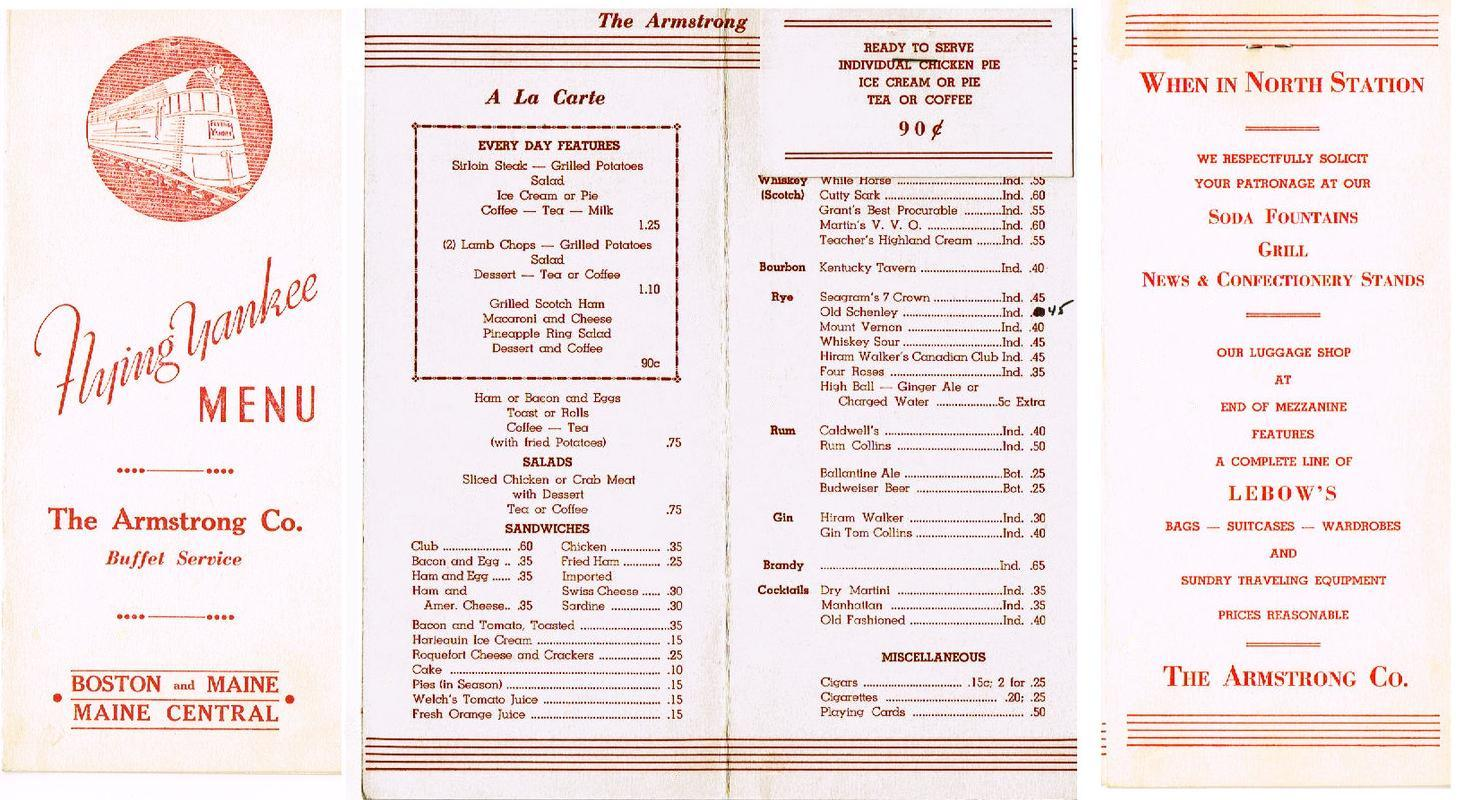
Menu from the train. Food was catered by the Armstrong Company as there was no diner on the train.

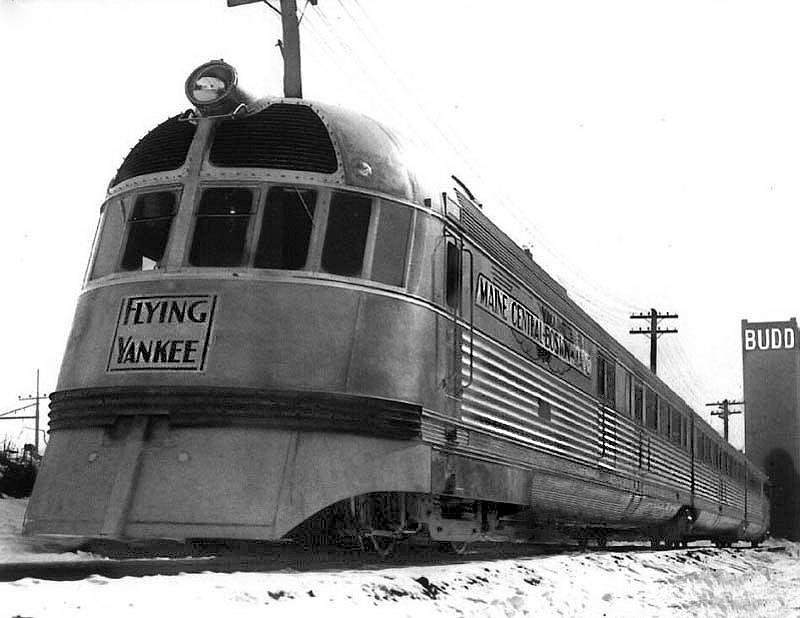
Rollout of the Flying Yankee at the Budd Company in 1935

This "drumhead" logo adorned the end of the observation car on the Flying Yankee.

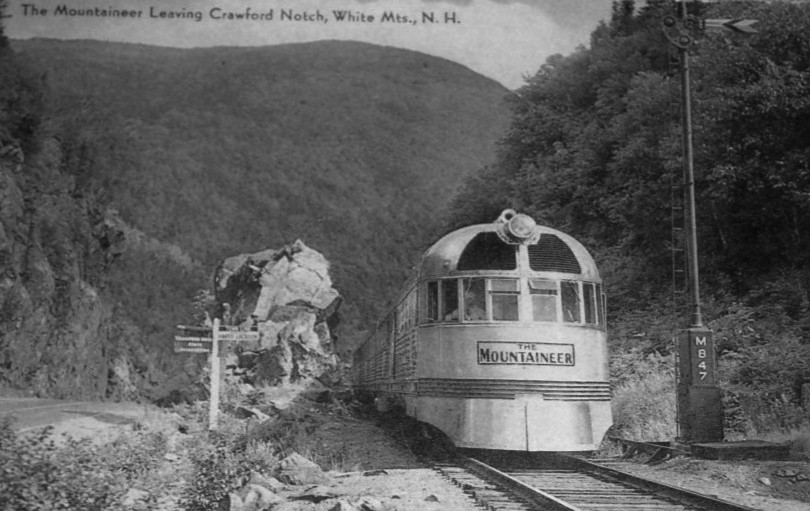
The train as The Mountaineer in 1944

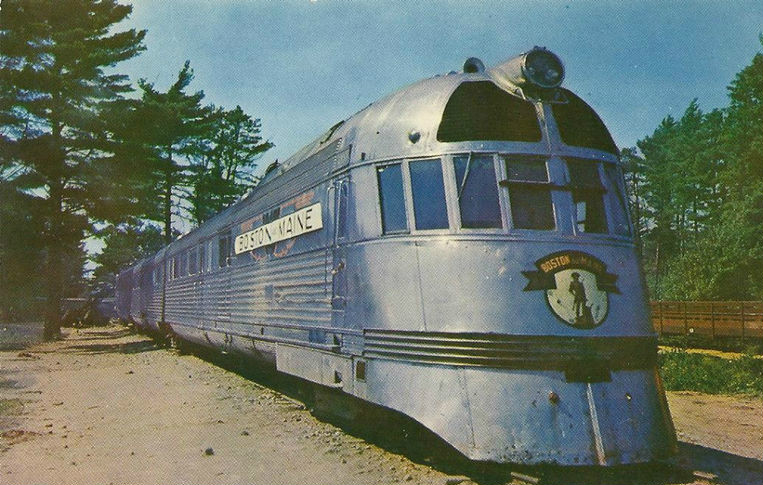
The train in Edaville after its 1957 retirement
