= Connecticut Yankee (train) =

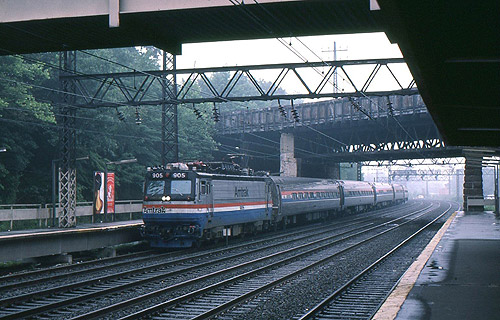
- Connecticut Yankee at Rye station, July 1985

Overview
- Service type: Inter-city rail
- Status: Discontinued
- Locale: Northeastern United States / Quebec
- First service: 1936
- Last service: 1951, 1977; 1995
- Former operator(s): New York, New Haven and Hartford Railroad, Boston & Maine, Canadian Pacific Railway, Quebec Central Railway; Penn Central (1969–1971); Amtrak (1971–1977, 1983–1995)

Route
- Termini: New York City; Quebec City
- Distance travelled: 549 miles (884 km) (1936)
- Service frequency: Daily
- Train number(s): Southbound: 74; Northbound: 79 (1936–c. 1956)

On-board services
- Seating arrangements: Coach
- Sleeping arrangements: Sections and drawing rooms
- Catering facilities: Dining car
- Observation facilities: Parlor car
- Entertainment facilities: Lounge car

Technical
- Track gauge: 4 ft 8 1/2 in (1,435 mm)

The Connecticut Yankee was a long-distance train in western New England, that in its first two decades was an international night train, established in 1936, that extended from New York City into southeastern Quebec, to Sherbrooke and Quebec City, a 549-mile (884 km) trip. The pooled train covered railroad territories of the New York, New Haven and Hartford, Boston and Maine, Canadian Pacific Railway and the Quebec Central Railway. It was the last U.S.-Canadian train serving the Sherbrooke to eastern Vermont route.

The train had some sharing of sleeping cars with the Boston & Maine's overnight Red Wing (the night train counterpart to the Alouette) which went from Boston to Montreal. In Newport, Vermont, the train would pick up sleepers from the B&M train and continue to Sherbrooke and Quebec.

== Railroad territories and major stops ==
- New Haven: New York City – Springfield, Massachusetts
  - Grand Central Terminal, Stamford, Bridgeport, New Haven, Hartford, Springfield, Massachusetts
- Boston & Maine: Springfield – Windsor and White River Junction – Wells River, Vermont
  - Springfield, Northampton, Greenfield, Brattleboro, Bellows Falls, Claremont Junction, White River Junction, Wells River
- Central Vermont: Windsor – White River Junction (then resuming travelling north on B&M trains)
- Canadian Pacific: Wells River – Sherbrooke
  - Wells River, St. Johnsbury, Newport, Sherbrooke
- Quebec Central: Sherbrooke – Quebec City
  - Sherbrooke, Tring Jonction in Robert-Ciche, Vallée Jonction in La Nouvelle-Beauce, Quebec City (Gare du Palais)

== Decline ==
Between the summer of 1951 and autumn of 1952, the route ended in Wells River, Vermont, marking the end of international train service directly south of Quebec City toward New England. (Passengers from New England wishing to reach Sherbrooke or Quebec City needed to take a bus between Wells River and Sherbrooke, whereupon they could take a train to Quebec City.) However, the train took a diversion at Wells River along Canadian Pacific tracks to Newport, Vermont, then a northwest-ward path toward Montreal. It was a night train on the northbound-Montreal trip; yet it was a day train on the southbound trip. As such, the train had no sleeping car for either direction of the trip.

Between the summer of 1958 and spring of 1959, the route had its northern limit cut from Wells River to Springfield, Massachusetts, the end of the New Haven territory for its route. Boston & Maine having begun scaling back its longer distance routes, the B&M offered a train, timed to connect, from Springfield to White River Junction. In 1961 the train continued for its NY-Springfield route, but it bore the name Bankers for the southbound trip. (The Pennsylvania Railroad and New Haven Railroad's Montrealer, traveling between Washington, D.C., and Montreal, another train serving the upper Connecticut River Valley, would continue service north of Springfield until September 1966.)

The train regained the name for both directions and persisted into the Penn Central and Amtrak periods. It was Springfield to Philadelphia train southbound and Washington to Springfield train northbound until ending in 1977. Amtrak resumed the train from 1983 to 1995.
