= Day White Mountains =

Overview
- Service type: Inter-city rail
- Status: Discontinued
- Locale: Northeastern United States/Quebec
- First service: 1926
- Last service: 1956
- Former operators: Boston & Maine; New Haven Railroad

Route
- Termini: New York City, New York; Berlin, New Hampshire
- Average journey time: 10 hours, 55 minutes (northbound); 11 hours, 50 minutes (southbound)
- Service frequency: Daily
- Train numbers: 77 (B&M), (northbound); 72 (B&M), (southbound)

On-board services
- Seating arrangements: Coach seating
- Catering facilities: Buffet parlor car

Technical
- Track gauge: 4 ft 8 1/2 in (1,435 mm)

The Day White Mountains was a passenger train jointly operated by the Boston and Maine Railroad and the New Haven Railroad between Berlin, New Hampshire and New York City, New York. It served vacationers to New Hampshire's White Mountains. In line with trains of that era, it made many local stops along the way, as many as 34 in 1948.

Prior to 1947, it was known as the "Day White Mountains Express". In 1956, the Day White Mountains name was discontinued and the service was replaced with Budd Rail Diesel Cars, requiring a transfer in White River. Junction. That unnamed service was discontinued in 1961.
