= Boston and Maine Railroad =

Railroad in New England (1836–1983)

- Routes of the Boston and Maine Railroad

Overview
- Headquarters: Boston, Massachusetts, U.S.
- Reporting mark: BM
- Locale: Maine; Massachusetts; New Hampshire; New York; Vermont
- Dates of operation: 1836–1983
- Successor: Pan Am Railways

Technical
- Track gauge: 4 ft 8 1/2 in (1,435 mm) standard gauge
- Length: 2,077 mi (3,343 km)

The Boston and Maine Railroad (reporting mark BM; commonly known as Boston & Maine, abbreviated B&M) was a U.S. Class I railroad in northern New England. It was chartered in 1835, and became part of what was the Pan Am Railways network in 1983, most of which was purchased by CSX in 2022.

At the end of 1970, B&M operated 1,515 route-miles (2,438 km) on 2,481 miles (3,993 km) of track, not including Springfield Terminal. That year, it reported 2,774 million ton-miles (4,464 million kilometres) of revenue freight and 92 million passenger-miles (148 million kilometres).

== History ==
The Andover and Wilmington Railroad was incorporated March 15, 1833, to build a branch from the Boston and Lowell Railroad at Wilmington, Massachusetts, north to Andover, Massachusetts. The line opened to Andover on August 8, 1836. The name was changed to the Andover and Haverhill Railroad on April 18, 1837, reflecting plans to build further to Haverhill, Massachusetts (opened later that year), and yet further to Portland, Maine, with renaming to the Boston and Portland Railroad on April 3, 1839, opening to the New Hampshire state line in 1840.

The Boston and Maine Railroad was chartered in New Hampshire on June 27, 1835, and the Maine, New Hampshire and Massachusetts Railroad was incorporated March 12, 1839, in Maine, both companies continuing the proposed line to South Berwick, Maine. The railroad opened in 1840 to Exeter, New Hampshire, and on January 1, 1842, the two companies merged with the Boston and Portland to form a new Boston and Maine Railroad.

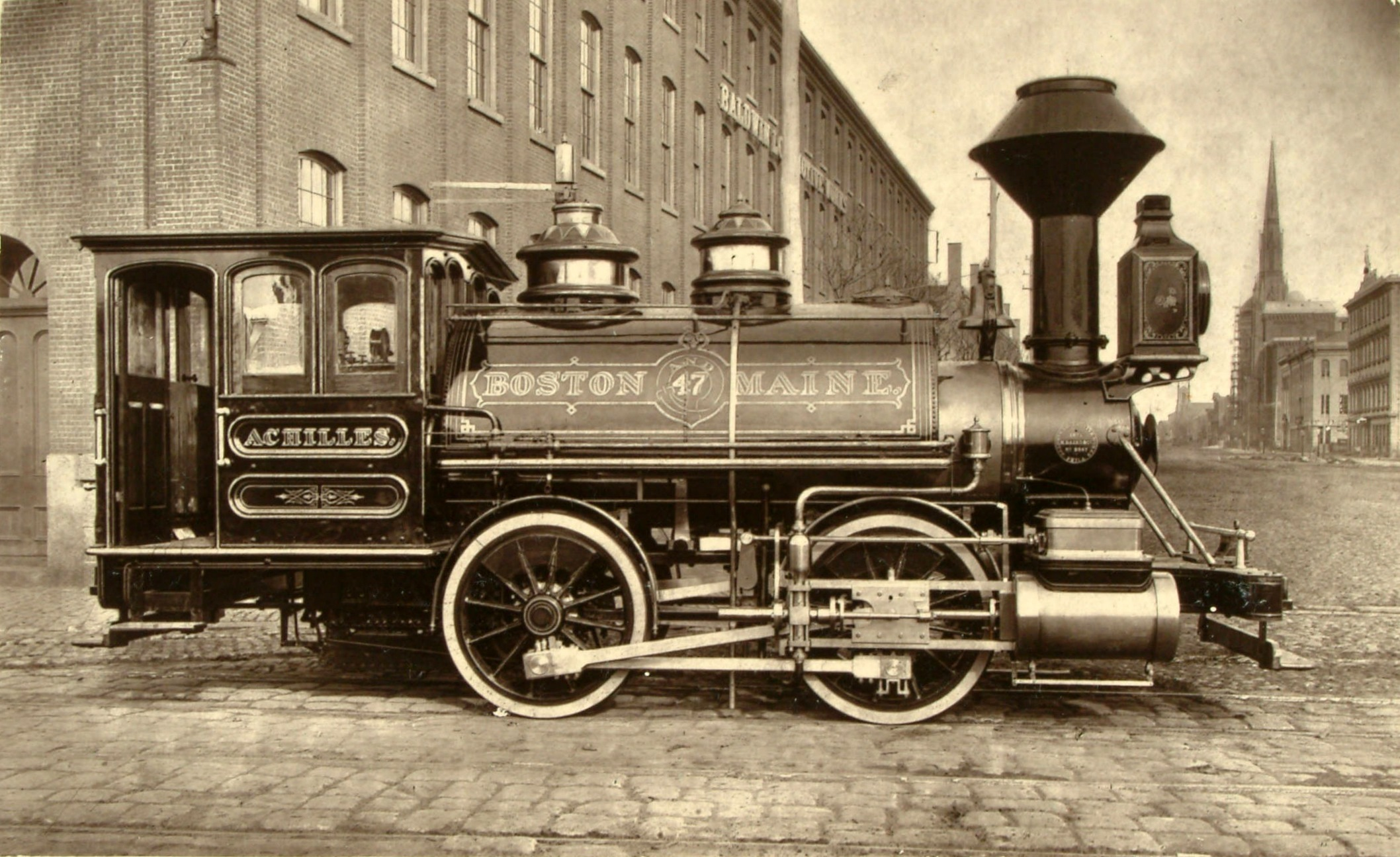
Woodburytype of 0-4-0 Achilles, Baldwin Locomotive Works, 1871

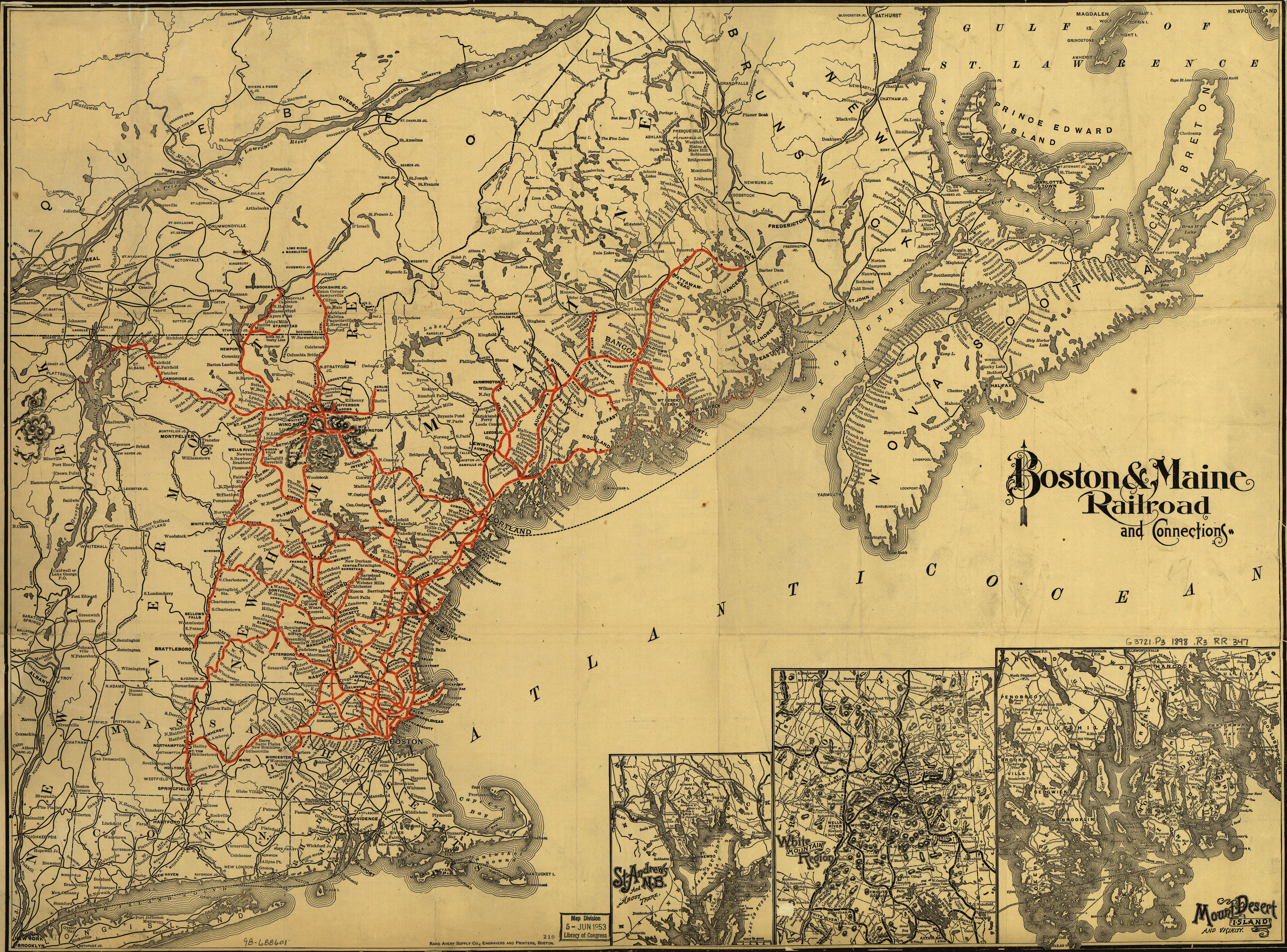
1898 map

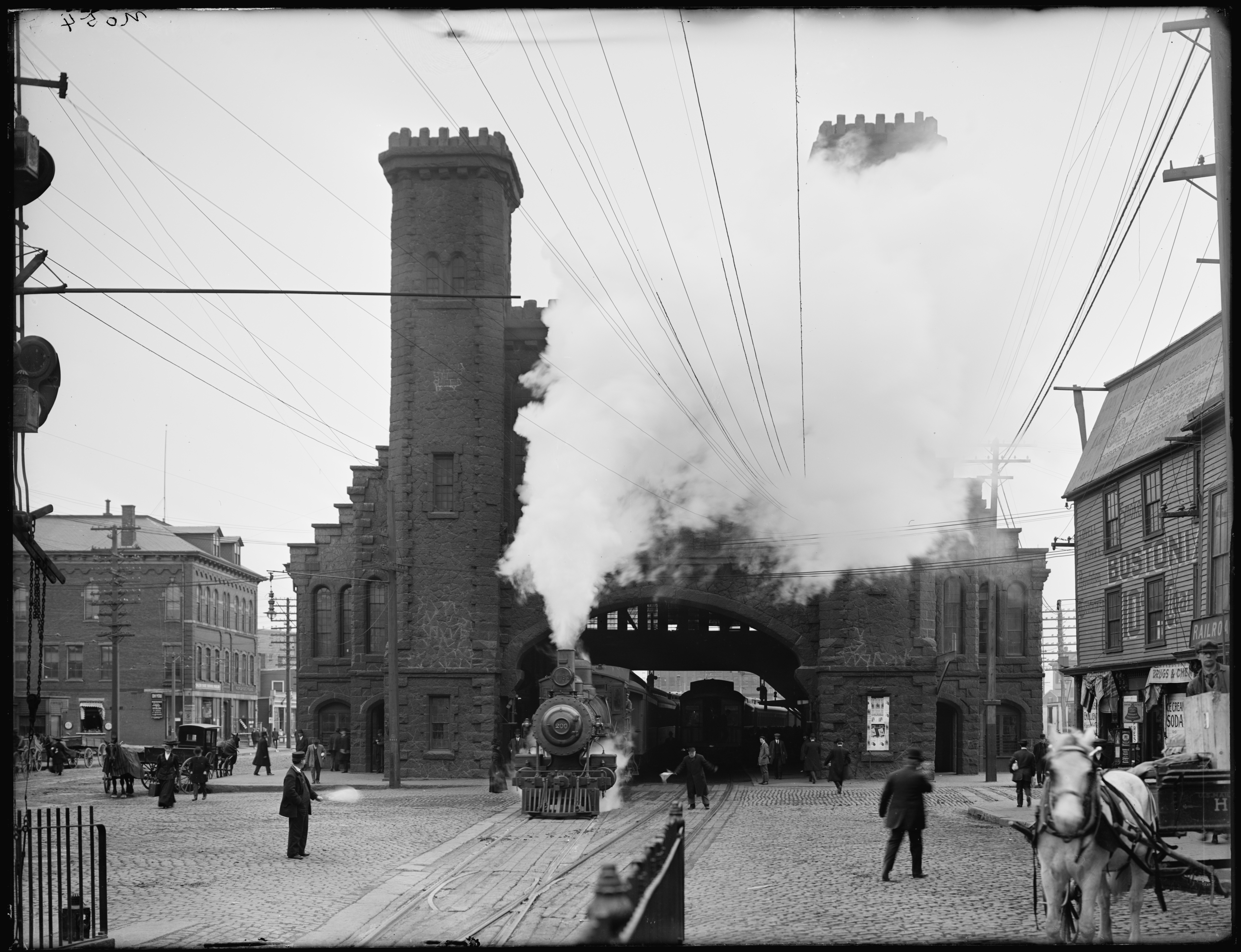
Locomotive emerging from Salem station on the Eastern line, c. 1910}

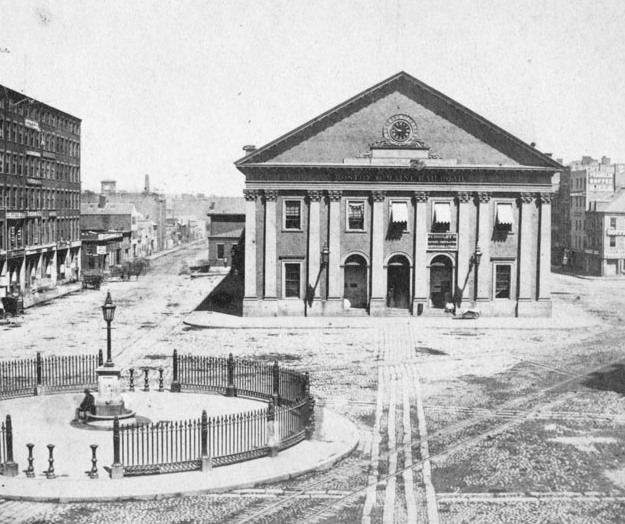
Boston and Maine depot in Boston, circa 19th century

On February 23, 1843, the B&M opened to Agamenticus, on the line of the Portland, Saco and Portsmouth Railroad in South Berwick. On January 28 of that year, the B&M and Eastern Railroad came to an agreement to both lease the PS&P as a joint line to Portland.

The Boston and Maine Railroad Extension was incorporated on March 16, 1844, due to a dispute with the Boston and Lowell Railroad over trackage rights rates between Wilmington and Boston. That company was merged into the main B&M on March 19, 1845, and opened on July 1, leading to the abandonment of the old connection to the B&L (later reused by the B&L for its Wildcat Branch). In 1848, another original section was abandoned, as a new alignment was built from Wilmington north to North Andover, Massachusetts in order to better serve Lawrence, Massachusetts.

A new alignment to Portland opened in 1873, splitting from the old route at South Berwick, Maine. The old route remained a part of the Eastern Railroad's Main Line (described below). This completed the B&M "main line", which would become known as the Western Route Main Line.

=== Acquisitions ===
As the B&M grew, it also gained control of former rivals, including:

==== Eastern ====
On March 28, 1883, the boards of directors of B&M and the Eastern Railroad Company voted to ratify the proposition that Eastern Railroad would be leased by B&M. However, a disagreement about the wording of the contract delayed its execution until December 2, 1884. On May 9, 1890, B&M purchased Eastern Railroad outright. This provided a second route to Maine, ending competition along the immediate route between Boston and Portland. Along with the Eastern, the B&M also acquired many branch lines, including the Conway Branch, the Saugus Branch, the South Reading Branch, and branches to Marblehead and Rockport, Massachusetts.

==== Worcester, Nashua and Portland ====
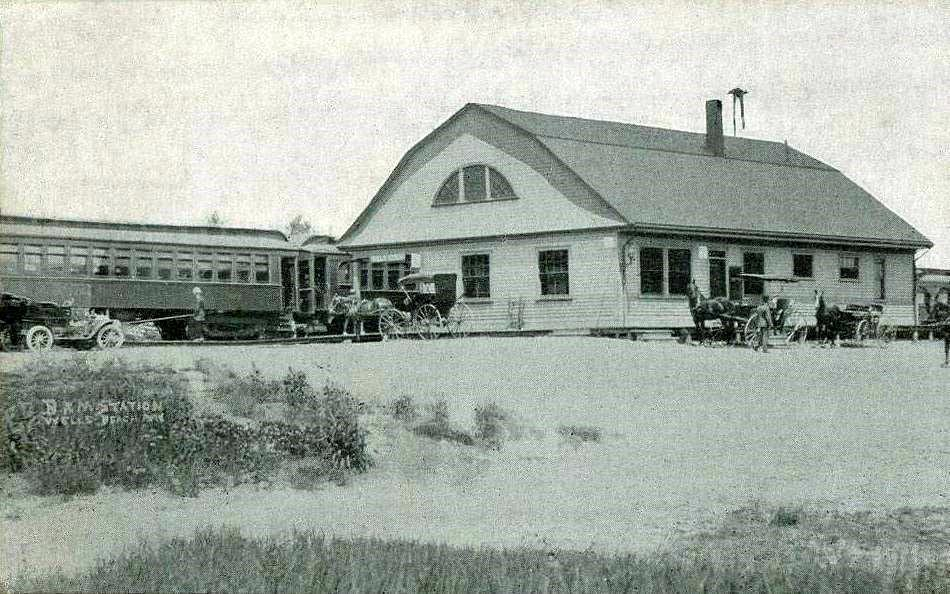
B&M station in Wells, Maine, c. 1910.

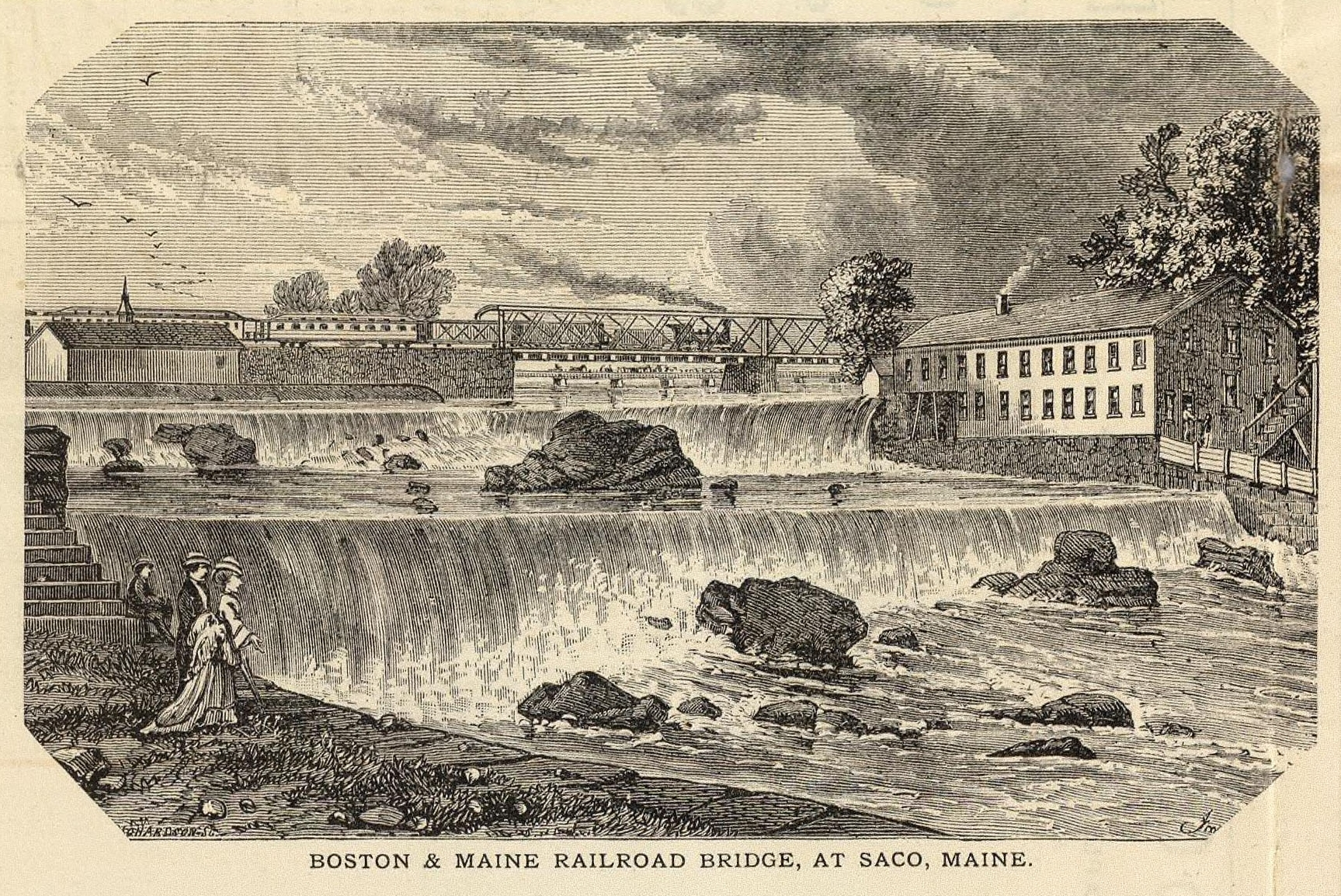
B&M train passing through Saco, Maine, c. 1879.

The Worcester and Nashua Railroad was organized in 1845 (opened 1848) and the Nashua and Rochester Railroad in 1847, forming a line between Worcester, Massachusetts, and Rochester, New Hampshire, via Nashua. The W&N leased the N&R in 1874, and the two companies merged into the Worcester, Nashua and Rochester Railroad in 1883. The B&M leased the line on January 1, 1886. This acquisition also included the continuation from Rochester to Portland, Maine, incorporated in 1846 as the York and Cumberland Railroad. It opened partially in 1851 and 1853, was reorganized as the Portland and Rochester Railroad in 1867, and opened the rest of the way in 1871. It was again reorganized in 1881 and then operated in conjunction with the line to Worcester.

==== Boston and Lowell ====
On April 1, 1887, the B&M leased the Boston and Lowell Railroad, adding not only trackage in the Boston area, but also the Central Massachusetts Railroad west to Northampton, the Boston, Concord and Montreal Railroad into northern New Hampshire, the St. Johnsbury and Lake Champlain Railroad to northwestern Vermont, and the Connecticut and Passumpsic Rivers Railroad from White River Junction into Quebec. However, the BC&M was separated in 1889 and merged with the Concord Railroad to form the Concord and Montreal Railroad, which the B&M leased on April 1, 1895, gaining the Concord Railroad's direct line between Nashua and Concord. Additionally, the St. Johnsbury and Lake Champlain Railroad, owned by the B&M through stock, was leased to the Maine Central Railroad by 1912. The Central Massachusetts Railroad stayed a part of the B&M, as did the Connecticut and Passumpsic Rivers Railroad (as the Passumpsic Division).

==== Northern ====
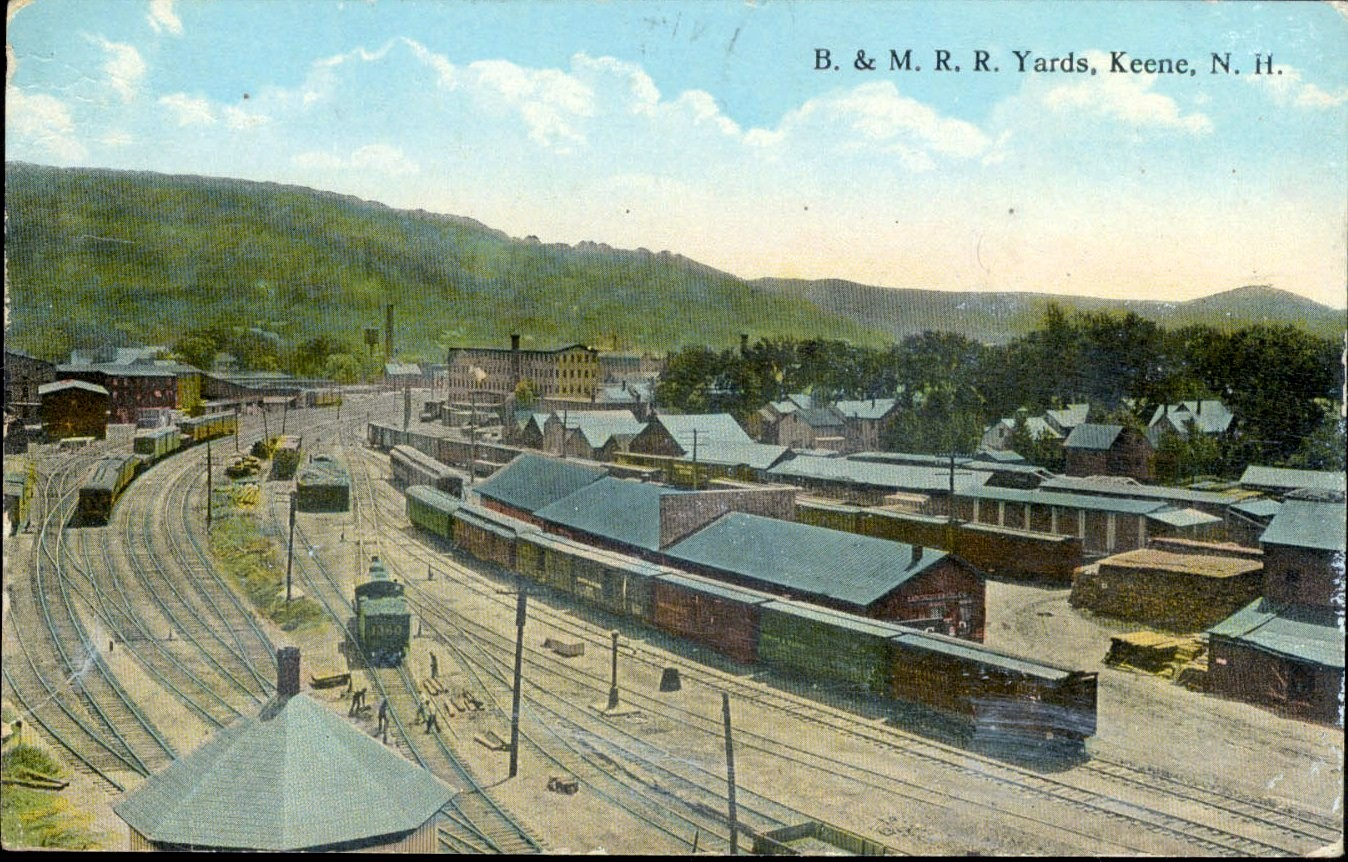
Boston and Maine railroad yard, Keene, New Hampshire, about 1916

The Northern Railroad was leased to the Boston and Lowell in 1884, but that lease was canceled and the Northern was on its own until 1890, when it was re-leased to the B&L, then part of the B&M. The Northern owned a number of lines running west from Concord.

==== Connecticut River ====
On January 1, 1893, the B&M leased the Connecticut River Railroad, with the main line from Springfield, Massachusetts north along the Connecticut River to White River Junction, Vermont, where the Connecticut and Passumpsic Rivers Railroad (acquired in 1887) continued north. Along with this railroad came the Ashuelot Railroad, which had been acquired in 1877.

==== Concord and Montreal ====
The B&M acquired the Boston, Concord and Montreal Railroad in 1887, but gave it up in 1889, allowing it to merge with the Concord Railroad to form the Concord and Montreal Railroad. That company did poorly on its own and was leased by the B&M on April 1, 1895, giving the B&M the majority of lines in New Hampshire.

==== Fitchburg ====
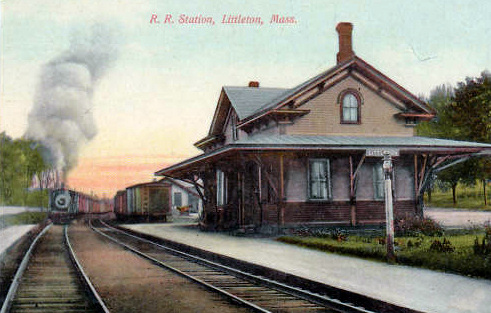
B&M Station at Littleton, Massachusetts, about 1910. This station still exists.

The B&M leased the Fitchburg Railroad on July 1, 1900. This was primarily the main line from Boston west via the Hoosac Tunnel to the Albany, New York, area, with various branches. On December 1, 1919, the B&M purchased the Fitchburg Railroad.

At one point, the B&M also owned a majority of stock of the Maine Central Railroad, stretching from Quebec via northern New Hampshire to southern and eastern Maine.

=== 20th century ===
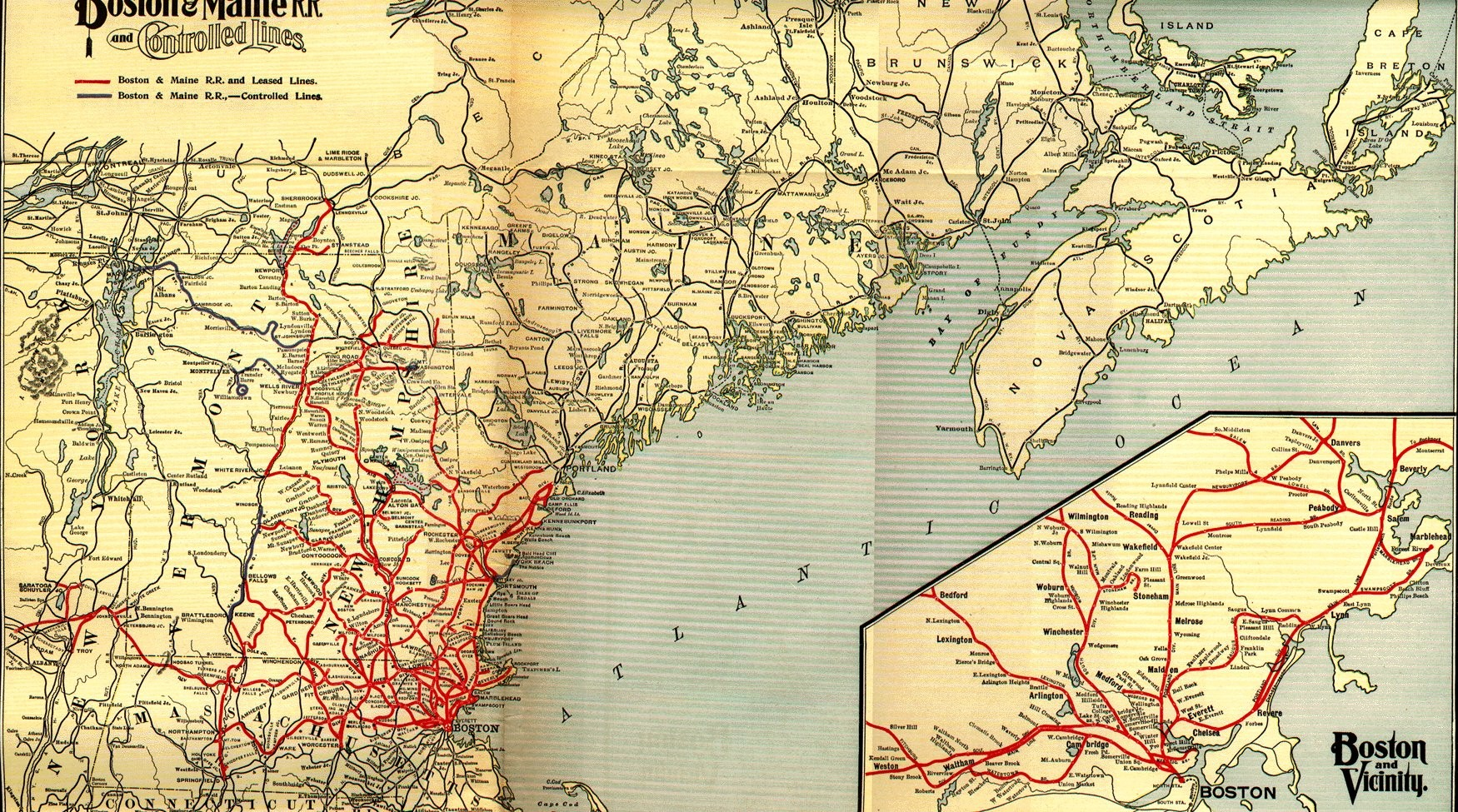
B&M 1916 system map

The B&M flourished with the growth of New England's mill towns in the late 19th and early 20th centuries, but still faced financial struggles. It came under the control of J. P. Morgan and his New York, New Haven and Hartford Railroad around 1910, but anti-trust forces wrested control back. Coal merchant John Leander Billard attempted a hostile takeover in 1914. Later, it faced heavy debt problems from track construction and from the cost of acquiring the Fitchburg Railroad, causing a corporate reorganization in 1919.

Beginning in the 1930s, freight business was hurt by the leveling-off of New England manufacturing growth and by new competition from trucking. In 1925, B&M reported 2956 million net ton-miles of revenue freight and 740 million passenger-miles; at the end of the year it operated 2291 route-miles, including "42.85 miles of electric street railway". (Those totals do not include B&C, M&WR, StJ&LC or YH&B.)

The B&M's most traveled and well known passenger trains included the Alouette, Ambassador, Cheshire, Day White Mountains, East Wind, Green Mountain Flyer, Gull, Kennebec, Minute Man, Montrealer/Washingtonian, Mountaineer, Pine Tree, Red Wing, and State of Maine. The B&M even promoted its passenger trains with the Timetable Marble radio advertisement. However, the popularization of the automobile doomed B&M as a passenger carrier.

==== Passenger service cuts ====
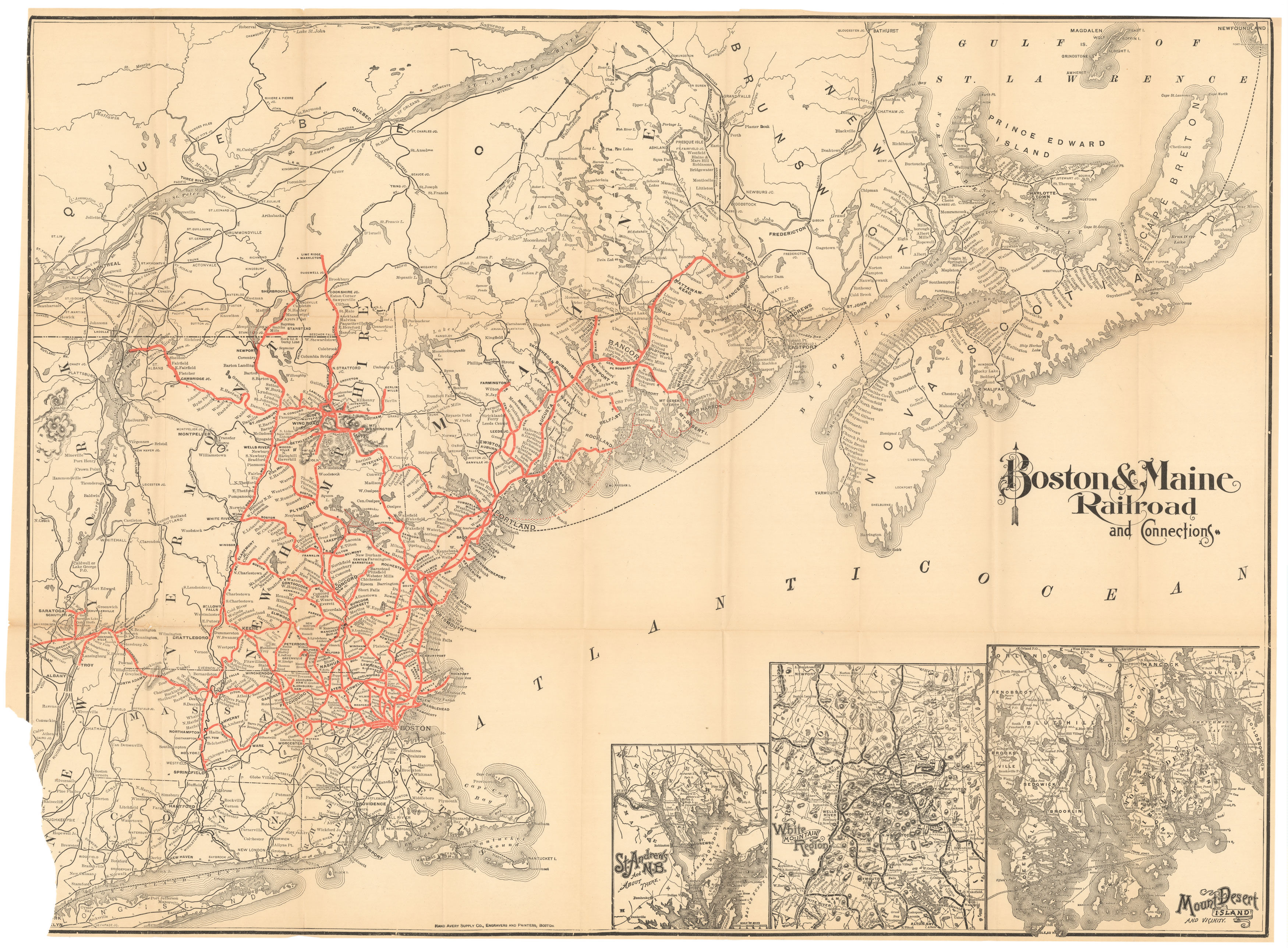
1901 map of the B&M (plus the MEC) near its maximum extent

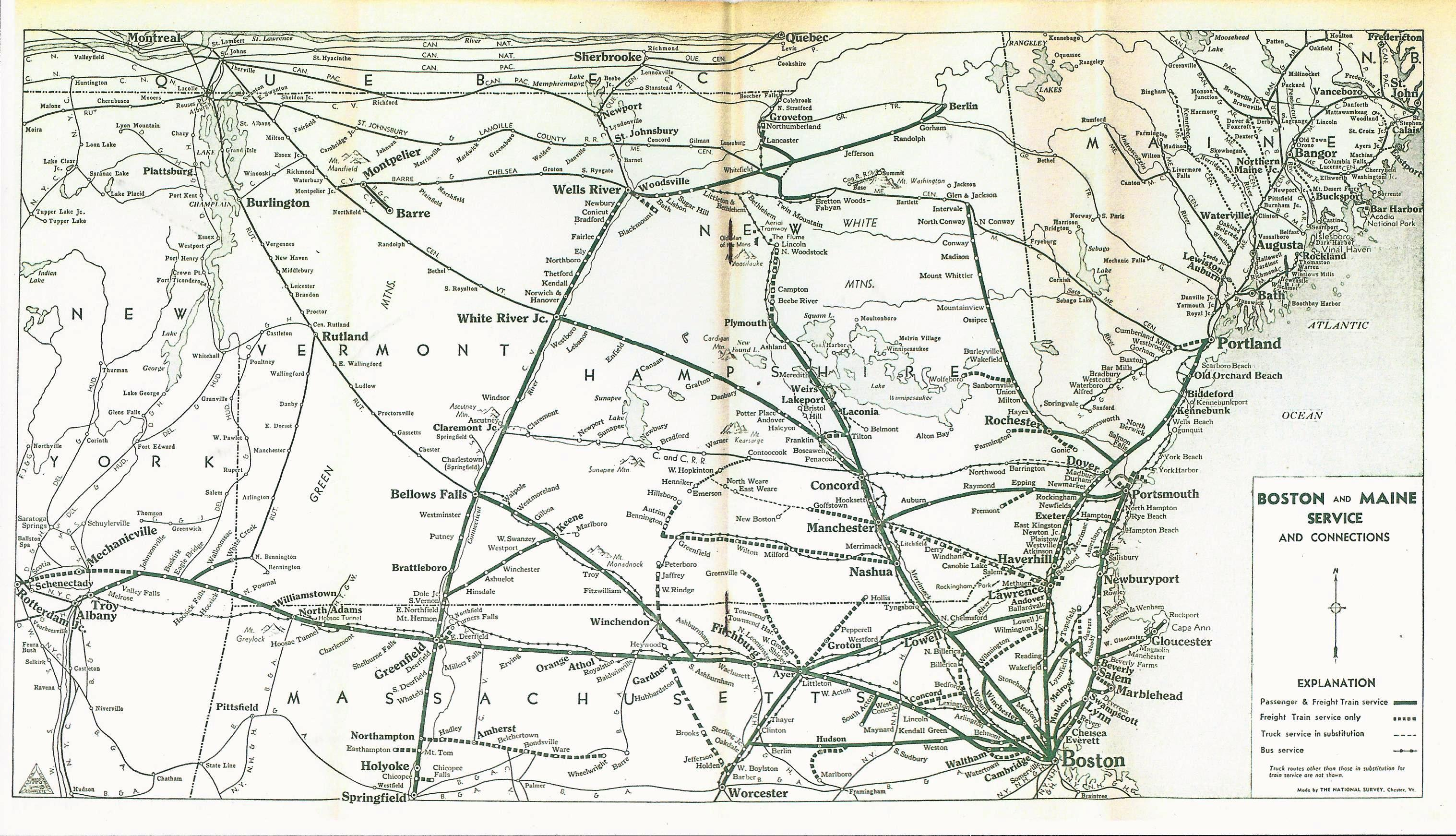
1956 map of remaining B&M service

After steady growth from 1901 to 1913, passenger rail ridership around Boston peaked in 1920 and began to decline due to competition from private automobiles and service cuts during World War I. In the mid-1920s, after several difficult years, the B&M discontinued service on some marginal lines and began using small self-propelled railcars on others. A second round of discontinuances occurred from 1931 to 1936 as the Great Depression reduced traffic. Ridership sharply increased during World War II; the B&M had a slower postwar decline than its contemporaries, though major frequency reductions occurred in 1949–1950. The B&M began testing Budd Rail Diesel Cars (RDCs) in 1952; in 1954, the railroad decided to switch all commuter service to RDCs to cut costs.

Discontinuances in the 1920s and 1930s primarily affected minor branches and rural intercity routes, but the 1950s saw the loss of more significant intercity routes. September, 1952 saw the first cut to the four main intercity mainlines, as Eastern Route service was cut from Portland, Maine to Portsmouth, New Hampshire. (Portland continued to see service to Boston on the Western Route through Dover, New Hampshire.) The New York–Montreal Green Mountain Flyer/Mount Royal, which had Boston sections running on the B&M via Bellows Falls, ended when the Rutland Railroad discontinued all passenger service, in 1953. The northern section of the Boston–Wells River, Vermont route ended in 1954 (thus ending connections to Quebec City), as did Manchester–Portsmouth service. Concord–Claremont Junction service ended in 1955, and the Boston section of the Ambassador was reduced to a Boston–White River Junction RDC connecting train in 1956. Fitchburg mainline service was trimmed from Troy, New York, to Williamstown, Massachusetts, in January 1958, and discontinued soon afterward.

Logo used from 1956 onward, designed by Herbert Matter

The B&M became unprofitable in 1958 and moved to shed its money-losing passenger operations. On May 18, 1958, the B&M severely reduced Boston commuter service. The Maynard Branch, Saugus Branch, Essex Branch, and Stoneham Branch were cut, and the Central Mass Branch was cut from Clinton to Hudson. Almost all inner-suburb commuter stations within the MTA transit district were closed. Intercity service to Bellows Falls, Vermont and Brattleboro, Vermont (the Cheshire) via the Cheshire Branch was also cut. Service was trimmed again from Williamstown to Greenfield on December 30, 1958, and cut to Fitchburg on April 23, 1960. Further cuts on June 14, 1959, terminated the Swampscott Branch, Marblehead Branch, Danvers Branch, and the north half of the Woburn Loop. The State of Maine Express - the last through service between New York City and Maine - and the Boston–Halifax Gull were discontinued in 1960. Long rural lines to North Conway and Berlin, New Hampshire were cut on December 3, 1961. By 1962, the B&M was preparing ICC applications to discontinue all remaining service.

After the major cuts by the B&M and the New Haven Railroad in the late 1950s, public opinion in Massachusetts began to favor supporting Boston commuter service to prevent it from being cut entirely. From January 1963 to March 1964, the state Mass Transportation Commission funded an experiment testing various fares and service levels on the two railroads. On August 3, 1964, the Massachusetts Bay Transportation Authority (MBTA) was formed (as an expansion of the MTA funding district) to subsidize suburban commuter rail operations. In December 1964, the MBTA and B&M reached an agreement for the MBTA to subsidize in-district service (within about 20 miles (32 km) of Boston) should the ICC applications be approved. Municipalities outside the MBTA district could directly subsidize continued service.

After approval of the applications, the B&M discontinued most interstate service on January 4, 1965. Service via Concord to Laconia, New Hampshire and to Montreal via White River Junction ended, though a single Boston–Concord round trip remained. Western Route service to Portland and Eastern Route service to Portsmouth were discontinued; single Boston–Dover and Boston–Newburyport round trips were retained. On January 18, 1965, commuter service was cut to the MBTA district and subsidies began. Fitchburg Route service was cut to West Concord; New Hampshire Route and Western Route service to Wilmington, save for the Concord and Dover trip; Eastern Route service to Manchester and Wenham except for the Newburyport trip; and Central Mass service to South Sudbury. After out-of-district communities agreed to subsidies, service was re-extended to Ayer, Lowell, Ipswich, and Rockport on June 28.

The Montrealer was discontinued in September, 1966; local service on the Connecticut River Line lasted until the end of that year. On June 30, 1967, the Concord trip was cut to Lowell, and the Dover trip to Haverhill. The four routes with single daily round-trips slowly ended: South Sudbury on November 26, 1971; Newburyport in April 1976; Haverhill in June 1976; and Bedford on January 10, 1977. (However, Haverhill service was restored by MVRTA subsidy in 1979.) On December 27, 1976, the MBTA bought all B&M commuter equipment, as well as most of the B&M's trackage on Boston's northside (including several abandoned lines). On March 12, 1977, the B&M also won the contract for the southside commuter rail lines that had once been part of the New Haven and B&A: the first time that Boston's commuter rail system had been operated by a single entity. The B&M operated the whole MBTA Commuter Rail system under contract to the MBTA until 1987. The final B&M line to lose passenger service was the Woburn Branch (former Woburn Loop), which was cut on January 30, 1981, due to poor track quality. Under public control, commuter rail service has returned to several lines cut by the B&M, and Portland intercity service returned with the Amtrak Downeaster, in 2001.

==== Regrowth ====
The B&M filed for bankruptcy in December 1970. During bankruptcy the B&M reorganized. It rebuilt its existing fleet of locomotives, leased new locomotives and rolling stock and secured funds for upgrading its track and signal systems.

For much of the 1970s, the Boston and Maine limped along. In 1973 and 1974 the B&M was on the brink of liquidation. The B&M was offered the opportunity to merge its properties into the new Conrail in 1976, but opted out.

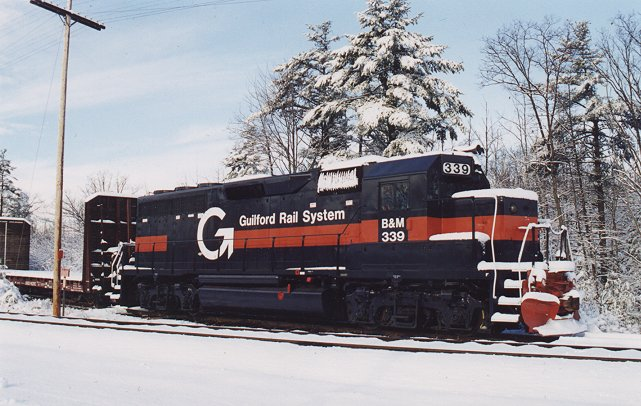
B&M 339 at work in Wells, Maine.

By 1980, though still a sick company, the B&M started turning around thanks to aggressive marketing and its purchase of a cluster of branch lines in Connecticut. The addition of coal traffic and piggyback service also helped. In 1983, the B&M emerged from bankruptcy when it was purchased by Timothy Mellon's Guilford Transportation Industries for $24 million. This was the beginning of the end of the Boston & Maine corporate image, and the start of major changes, such as new labor issues which caused the strikes of 1986 and 1987, and drastic cost-cutting such as the 1990 closure of B&M's Mechanicville, New York, site: the largest rail yard and shop facilities on the B&M system.

=== 21st century ===
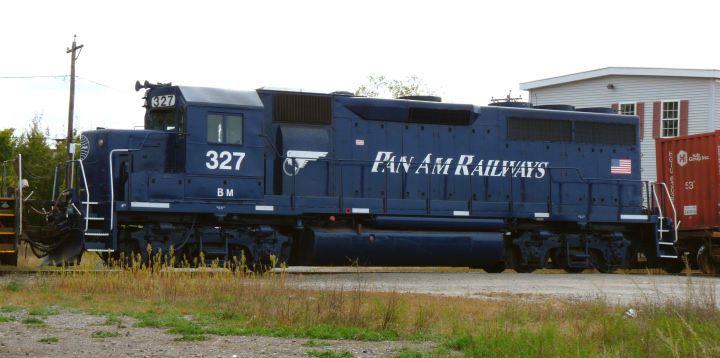
Pan Am Railways Locomotive #327 with Boston & Maine markings on cab in 2009

Guilford Rail System changed its name to Pan Am Railways in 2006. Up until CSX Transportation acquired Pan Am Railways on June 1, 2022, Boston & Maine Corporation continued to exist, but only as a non-operating ward of PAR. Boston & Maine owned the property (and also employed its own railroad police), while Springfield Terminal Railway, a B&M subsidiary created by owner Timothy Mellon to break the unions' higher wage scales, operated the trains and performed maintenance. Pan Am Railways and all its subsidiaries are now owned by CSX.

Pan Am entered a joint venture with Norfolk Southern Railway (NS) in April, 2009 to form Pan Am Southern (PAS). PAR transferred to the PAS assets that included its 155-mile (249 km) main line track between Mechanicville, New York, and Ayer, Massachusetts, including the Hoosac Tunnel and Fitchburg line as far as Littleton, Massachusetts, and 281 miles (452 km) of secondary and branch lines, plus trackage rights, in Connecticut, Massachusetts, New Hampshire, New York and Vermont. NS transferred cash and other property valued at $140 million to the joint venture, $87.5 million of which was expected to be invested within a three-year period in capital improvements on the Patriot Corridor, such as terminal expansions, track and signal upgrades. Springfield Terminal provides all railroad services for the joint venture.

Service at B&M's former yard in Mechanicville, New York, was restored as an intermodal and automotive terminal in January 2012, under PAS.

=== Incidents ===
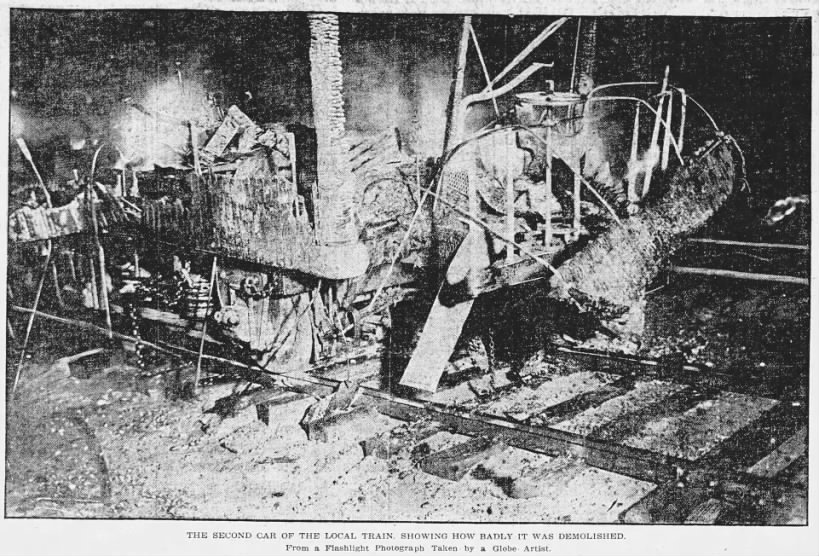
1905 Baker Bridge train wreck

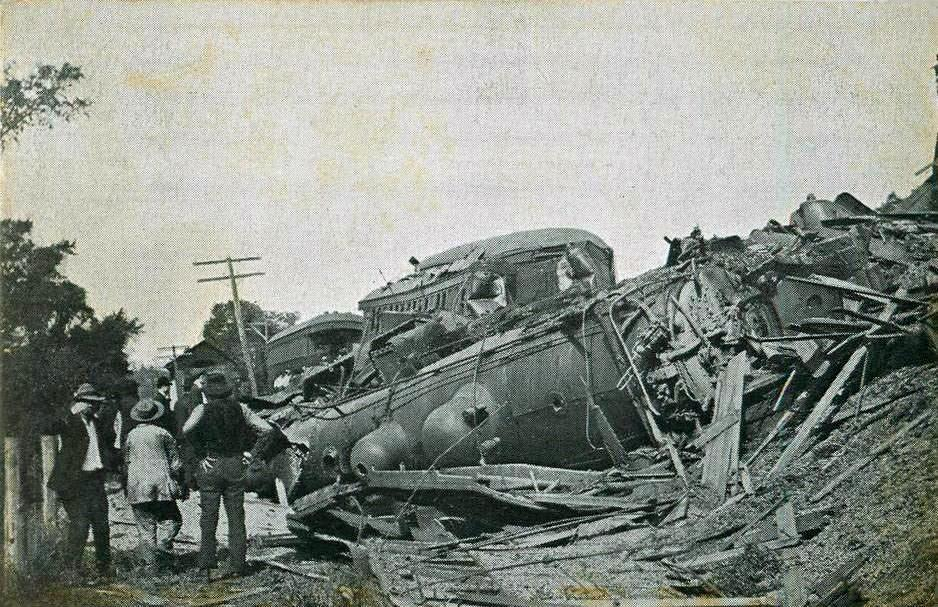
1907 Canaan train wreck

A number of accidents and train wrecks occurred during the railroad's history; various examples of incidents that were reported in local or regional newspapers follow. All equipment involved was Boston & Maine, unless noted as a third party.

On November 26, 1905, an express train rear-ended a local passenger train in Lincoln, Massachusetts, resulting in the deaths of 15 passengers and two railroad employees.

On October 4, 1906, a military special train rear-ended a stopped passenger train at Lansingburgh, New York, resulting in the deaths of five people on the passenger train; a sixth died later in hospital.

On September 15, 1907, a significant wreck occurred near Canaan, New Hampshire. Four miles (6.4 km) west of Canaan Station, the southbound Quebec to Boston express, crowded with passengers returning from the Sherbrooke Fair, collided head-on with a northbound freight train. The accident claimed 26 lives, and 17 others were seriously injured. The accident was found to be due to a mistake made by a dispatcher, who mis-identified a train in one of his communications.

On October 2, 1907, a passenger train and a freight train suffered a head-on collision in Worcester, Massachusetts, at Barber's Crossing. There were no fatalities, but multiple passengers and crew members were injured. The accident was attributed to the engineer of the passenger train violating a block signal.

On March 20, 1908, two freight trains had a head-on collision approximately 1 1/2 miles (2.4 km) south of Haverhill, New Hampshire, resulting in the deaths of four crew members.

On September 21, 1909, near the Pattee station in the West Canaan village of Canaan, New Hampshire, the Montreal Express had a rear-end collision with the Quebec Express. The Quebec Express had trouble maintaining speed and failed to adequately warn the Montreal Express. No passengers died, but an engineer and fireman on the Montreal Express were killed, as was a trespasser who had been riding on that train outside the baggage car.

On September 10, 1918, a passenger train was rear-ended by a freight train in Dummerston, Vermont, killing three passengers and injuring 25 others.

On August 19, 1949, a switching error in Canaan, New Hampshire, resulted in the head-on collision between the northbound and southbound editions of the Ambassador, which provided passenger service between Boston and Montreal. There were no fatalities, but 44 people were injured.

On November 12, 1954, the Boston-bound Red Wing passenger train overturned in Nashua, New Hampshire, resulting in the death of one woman and injuring 19 other people. Crew members stated that a braking failure led to the crash; it was the first fatal accident for the railroad since 1918.

On February 28, 1956, a stopped local train was rear-ended by a Buddliner in Swampscott, Massachusetts, resulting in the deaths of 11 passengers and two crew members.

On August 17, 1964, two Buddliners suffered a head-on collision in Winchester, Massachusetts, injuring 30 people.

On December 28, 1966, a Buddliner collided with a stalled oil truck owned by Oxbow Transport Corporation at a crossing in Everett, Massachusetts; the ensuing fire claimed the lives of 11 passengers and two crew members.

On February 21, 1967, a commuter train hit a car on a crossing in Chelsea, Massachusetts, killing two women and injuring three others.

== Named passenger trains ==
The B&M operated a number of named passenger trains, which were often the premier intercity service on their routes. Most were through service that were shared between the B&M and other railroads, including the Canadian National Railway (CN), Canadian Pacific Railway (CP), Central Vermont Railway (CV), Maine Central Railroad (MEC), New York, New Haven and Hartford Railroad (NH), Pennsylvania Railroad (PRR), Quebec Central Railway (QC), and Rutland Railroad (RUT). Trains originating in New York City or Washington, D.C., ran through Springfield (using the Connecticut River Line) or Worcester (using the Worcester Branch) and bypassed Boston. Certain commuter trains with wealthy clientele were also named; several of these lasted into the MBTA era. These tables list major named intercity trains operated by the B&M.

=== Boston trains ===
Name	#	Destination	Partner railroad(s)	Final B&M station	Year discontinued	Notes
Alouette	5/20	Montreal via Plymouth and Newport	CP	Wells River	1956	Operated via White River Junction after 1954. Unnamed RDC train continued until 1965.
Ambassador	307/332	Montreal via White River Junction and Essex Junction	CV	White River Junction	1956	New York section lasted until 1966.
Cannon Ball	313/320	Plymouth via Concord	–	–	1959	
Cheshire	5505/5506	Bellows Falls via Keene	CV	White River Junction	1958	
Flying Yankee	15/16	Bangor via Dover, Portland, and Auburn	MEC	Portland	1957	
Green Mountain Flyer	64/65	Montreal via Bellows Falls, Rutland, and Burlington	RUT	Bellows Falls	1953	
Gull	8/23	Halifax via Portland and Vanceboro	CN, CP, MEC	Portland	1960	
Kennebec	11/12	Bangor via Dover, Portland, and Brunswick	MEC	Portland	1958	
Minute Man	58/59	Troy via Fitchburg	–	–	1958	Connecting service to Chicago via the New York Central Railroad
Mount Royal	5502/5511	Montreal via Bellows Falls, Rutland, and Burlington	RUT	Bellows Falls	1953	
Mountaineer	2909/2924	Littleton via Dover and Conway	MEC	Intervale	1955	
New Englander	302/325	Montreal via White River Junction and Essex Junction	CV	White River Junction	1953	
Penobscot	22/27	Bangor via Dover, Portland, and Auburn	MEC	Portland	1957	
Pine Tree	14/19	Bangor via Dover, Portland, and Brunswick	MEC	Portland	1958	
Red Wing	302/325	Montreal via White River Junction and Wells River	CP	Wells River	1959	Exchanged through cars with the Connecticut Yankee.
Speed Merchant	4/9	Portland via Dover	–	–	1965	

=== New York/Washington trains via Springfield ===
Name	#	Destination	Partner railroad(s)	Final B&M station	Year discontinued	Notes
Ambassador	307/332	Montreal via White River Junction and Essex Junction	NH, CV	White River Junction	1966	
Connecticut Yankee	74/79	Quebec City via White River Junction and Newport	CP, NH, QC	Wells River	1952	Exchanged through cars with the Red Wing.
Day White Mountains	72/77	Berlin via Wells River	NH	–	1956	
Montrealer/Washingtonian	70/71	Montreal via White River Junction and Essex Junction	NH, CV, PRR	White River Junction	1966	
Night White Mountains	71/76	Berlin via Wells River	NH	–	1956	
North Wind	75/70	Whitefield or Bretton Woods via White River Junction	NH, CV, MEC	White River Junction	1956	Summers only.

=== New York/Washington trains via Worcester ===
Name	#	Destination	Partner railroad(s)	Final B&M station	Year discontinued	Notes
Bar Harbor Express	84/85	Bar Harbor (via ferry) via Ayer, Portland, and Bangor	PRR, NH, MEC	Portland	1960	Summers only.
East Wind	120/121	Bar Harbor (via ferry) via Ayer, Portland, and Bangor	PRR, NH, MEC	Portland	1953	Summers only.
State of Maine	81/82	Bangor via Ayer and Portland	NH, MEC	Portland	1960	

== Surviving equipment ==
The 1935 three-car trainset known as the Flying Yankee, virtually identical to the streamlined equipment the Budd Company built for the Chicago Burlington & Quincy Pioneer Zephyr, was retired in 1957 and was then displayed at the Railroad for another 36 years. The equipment was relocated and eventually purchased by the State of Maine, but both public and private restoration efforts were unsuccessful. In November 2023, the state of New Hampshire put the equipment up for sale, with a focus on "the relocation and encouraged restoration" of the trainset. In April 2024, the trainset was sold to the Flying Yankee Association, who hopes to restore and operate the set in the Mt. Washington Valley, with a possibility of running it on the Conway Scenic Railroad. The trainset was moved to North Conway where it regained its trucks.

Five steam locomotives are also preserved with all being located in the northeast. These consist of 0-6-0 no. 410 in Lowell, Massachusetts, 0-6-0 no. 444 in Dunkirk, New York, 4-4-0 no. 494 at the White River Junction station in White River Junction, Vermont, 2-6-0 no. 1455 at the Danbury Railway Museum in Danbury, Connecticut, and 4-6-2 no. 3713 at Steamtown National Historic Site in Scranton, Pennsylvania. Additionally, a sixth locomotive (4-6-2 no. 3666) is still around being submerged in the Piscataqua River in Portsmouth, New Hampshire.

== See also ==
- Northeast Airlines, which began in 1931 as Boston-Maine Airways
