= New York, New Haven and Hartford Railroad =

American Class I railroad (1872–1968)

- System map, 1918 (not including its temporary acquisition of the NY&OW)
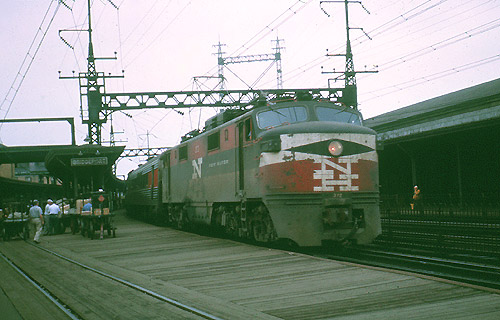
- A New Haven Railroad train in Bridgeport, Connecticut, in 1962

Overview
- Headquarters: New Haven, Connecticut
- Reporting mark: NH
- Locale: Connecticut; Massachusetts; New York; Rhode Island
- Dates of operation: 1872–1968
- Predecessors: List of New York, New Haven and Hartford Railroad precursors
- Successor: Penn Central Transportation Company

Technical
- Track gauge: 4 ft 8 1/2 in (1,435 mm) standard gauge
- Electrification: AC overhead catenary on some lines
- Length: 2,256 miles (3,631 kilometers)

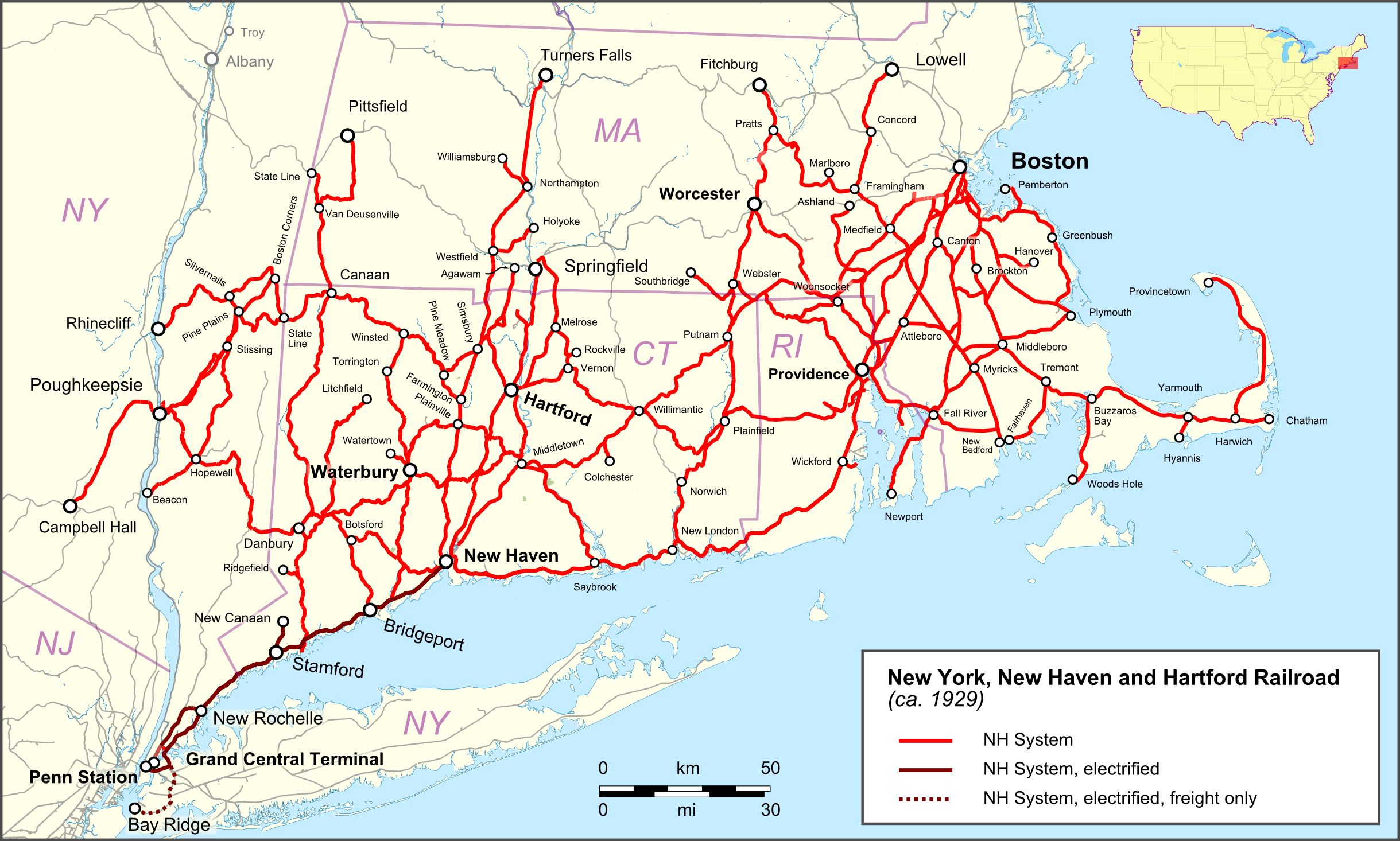
NH system map ca. 1929

The New York, New Haven and Hartford Railroad (reporting mark NH), commonly known as The Consolidated, or simply as the New Haven, was a railroad that operated principally in the New England region of the United States from 1872 to 1968. Founded by the merger of the New York and New Haven and Hartford and New Haven railroads, the company had near-total dominance of railroad traffic in Southern New England for the first half of the 20th century.

Beginning in the 1890s and accelerating in 1903, New York banker J. P. Morgan sought to monopolize New England transportation by arranging the NH's acquisition of 50 companies, including other railroads and steamship lines, and building a network of electrified trolley lines that provided interurban transportation for all of southern New England. By 1912, the New Haven operated more than 2,000 miles (3,200 km) of track, with 120,000 employees, and practically monopolized traffic in a wide swath from Boston to New York City.

This quest for monopoly angered Progressive Era reformers, alienated public opinion, raised the cost of acquiring other companies and increased the railroad's construction costs. The company's debt soared from $14 million in 1903 to $242 million in 1913, while the advent of automobiles, trucks and buses reduced its profits. Also in 1914, the federal government filed an antitrust lawsuit that forced the NH to divest its trolley systems, however, in practice this did not ultimately occur.

The line became bankrupt in 1935. It emerged from bankruptcy, albeit reduced in scope, in 1947, only to go bankrupt again in 1961. In 1969, its rail assets were merged with the Penn Central system, formed a year earlier by the merger of the New York Central Railroad and Pennsylvania Railroad. Already a poorly conceived merger, Penn Central went bankrupt in 1970, becoming the largest U.S. bankruptcy until the Enron Corporation superseded it in 2001. The remnants of the system now comprise Metro-North Railroad's New Haven Line, much of the northern leg of Amtrak's Northeast Corridor, Connecticut's Shore Line East and Hartford Line, parts of the MBTA, and numerous freight operators such as CSX and the Providence and Worcester Railroad. The majority of the surviving system is now owned publicly by the states of Connecticut, Rhode Island, and Massachusetts, with other surviving segments owned by freight railroads; many abandoned lines have been converted into rail trails.

== History ==
=== Predecessors and formation (1839–1872) ===
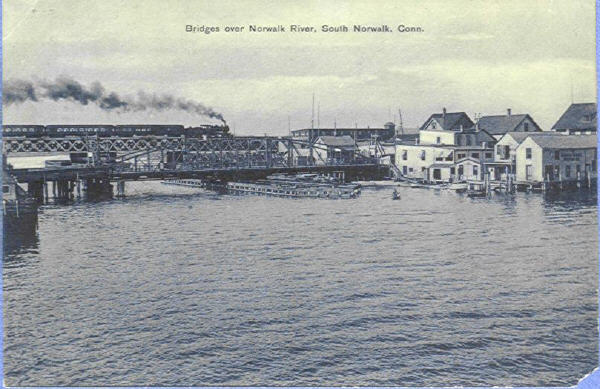
Train over the Norwalk River (1914 postcard)

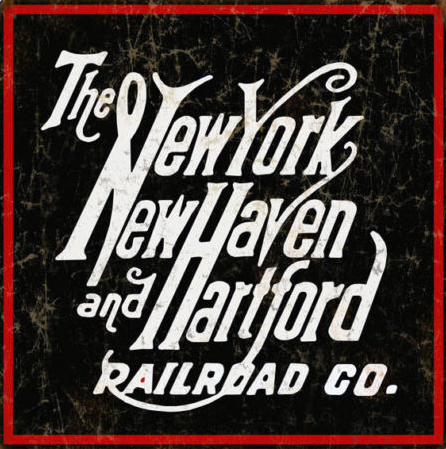
The railroad's original script style logo

The New Haven system was formed by the merger of two railroads that intersected in New Haven, Connecticut: the Hartford and New Haven Railroad, which began service between New Haven and Hartford in 1839 and reached Springfield, Massachusetts, in 1844, and the New York and New Haven Railroad, which opened in 1848 between its namesake cities. The two companies had a history of cooperation; for a time, they jointly leased the New Haven and Northampton Railroad and coordinated their steamship services with each other.

An initial merger attempt between the two in 1870 was rejected by the Connecticut General Assembly, largely over fears that the merged railroad would form a monopoly. But the legislature approved a second attempt just two years later, and the New York, New Haven and Hartford Railroad was formed on July 24, 1872. The newly combined railroad owned a main line from New York City to Springfield via New Haven and Hartford, and also reached New London, Connecticut, via a lease of the Shore Line Railway (leased in 1870 by the New York and New Haven Railroad). In its first decades, the railroad was widely known as "the Consolidated".

=== Expansion and acquisitions (1872–1900) ===
The company later leased more lines and systems, eventually forming a virtual monopoly in New England south of the Boston and Albany Railroad. In 1882, the railroad leased the Boston and New York Air-Line Railroad, the last railroad in the city of New Haven not controlled by the New Haven system. This new acquisition gave the New Haven Railroad a connection to Willimantic, Connecticut. Three more companies, the New Haven and Northampton Railroad, the Naugatuck Railroad, and the Connecticut Valley Railroad, were leased by the New Haven in 1887. With these leases, the New Haven was in control of 10 of the 22 railroads in Connecticut at the time.

The New Haven took control of the New York, Providence and Boston Railroad (NYP&B) in 1892, adding its main line from New London to Providence, Rhode Island, to the New Haven's system along with the NYP&B-controlled Providence and Worcester Railroad route from Providence to Worcester, Massachusetts. Acquired the same year was the Housatonic Railroad, running between southwestern Connecticut and western Massachusetts, along with that railroad's own acquisitions including the Danbury and Norwalk Railroad and the New Haven and Derby Railroad.

The Old Colony Railroad was taken over in 1893 by lease, completing a single railroad route to Boston and adding a network of branches in southeastern Massachusetts to the New Haven system. The New York and New England Railroad, for decades a fierce rival of the New Haven, finally fell to its competitor in 1895 and further entrenched the New Haven's control of railroad lines in southern New England.

=== Early 20th century (1900–1935) ===
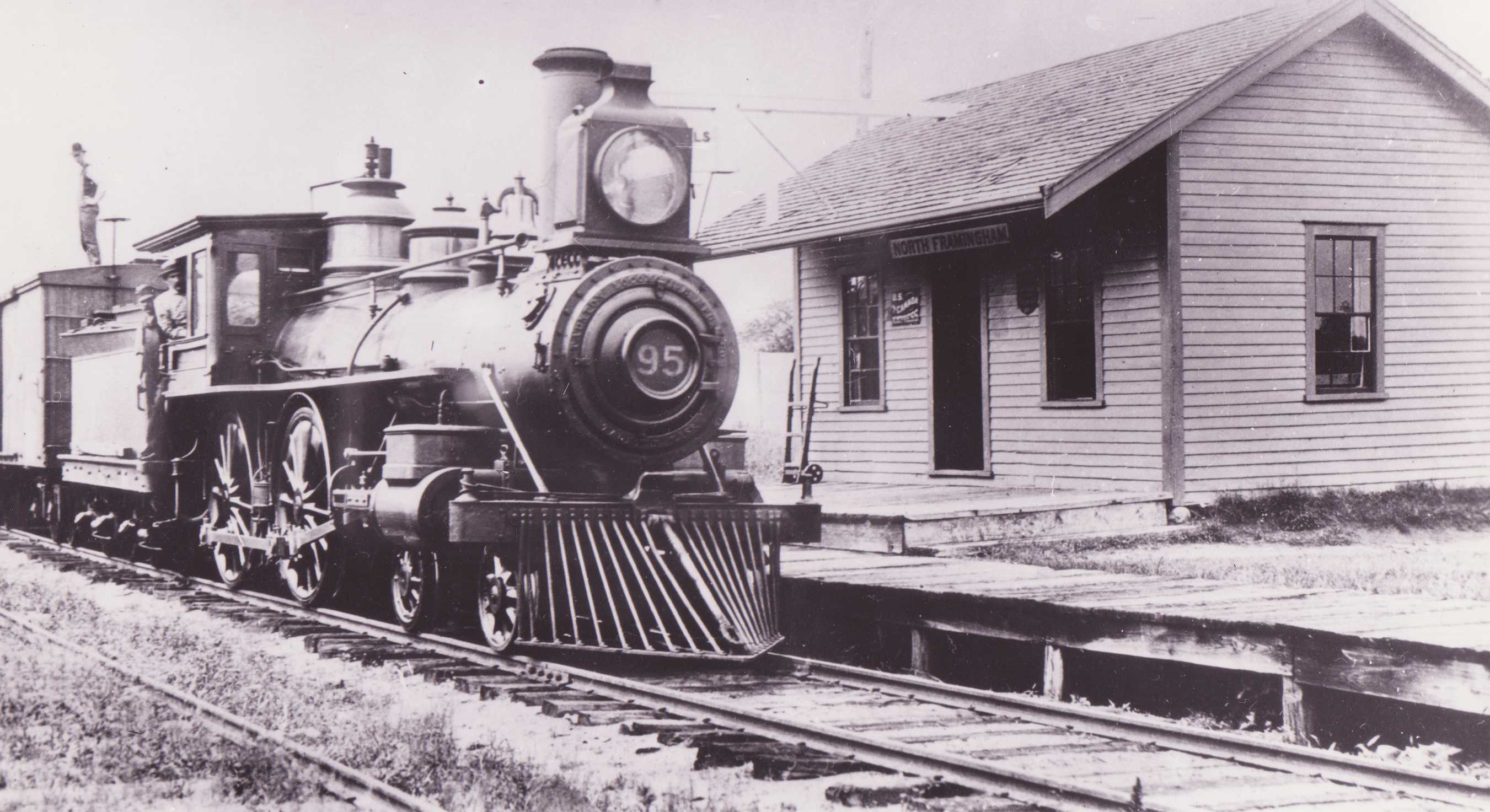
By 1900, the New Haven's trains could be found almost everywhere in Southern New England

Around the beginning of the 20th century, New York investors led by J. P. Morgan gained control, and in 1903 installed Charles S. Mellen as President. Charles Francis Murphy's New York Contracting and Trucking company was awarded a $6 million contract in 1904 (equal to $215,000,000 today) to build rail lines in the Bronx for the New York, New Haven, and Hartford Railroad. An executive at the railroad said the contract was awarded to avoid friction with New York City’s Tammany Hall political machine. In response to this contract, the New York State Legislature amended the city's charter so that franchise-awarding power was removed from the city council and given to the Board of Estimate and Apportionment, which only became defunct in 1989.

The struggling Central New England Railway (CNE) became a subsidiary of the New Haven system in 1904, completing the New Haven's dominance of southern New England railroads. Control of that company unlocked a new route for freight to and from Maybrook, New York, via the Poughkeepsie Bridge across the Hudson River, replacing the car float operation that previously took place at Fishkill Landing. Once the CNE was under control, a 110-mile (180 km) long route from Maybrook to Devon, Connecticut, known as the Maybrook Line, was improved and expanded by the New Haven into a double track freight corridor, while Maybrook Yard was constructed as a classification yard and locomotive servicing and maintenance point. The Maybrook Line used parts of the CNE, New York and New England, Housatonic, and Naugatuck railroads. It was fully double tracked in 1913. The full CNE main line crossing rural northwest Connecticut to Hartford was unsuitable as a freight corridor owing to steep grades up to 1.6 percent. A signal system was completed and operational along the full length of the Maybrook Line in 1926.

In total, 175 different companies were combined to create the full New Haven system. At its peak, the New Haven operated 2,256 route miles (3,631 km). 2,185 of those route miles hosted passenger service in 1920.

Morgan and Mellen achieved a complete monopoly of transportation in southern New England, purchasing other railroads and steamship and trolley lines. Substantial improvements to the system were made during the Mellen years, including electrification between New York and New Haven. Morgan and Mellen went further and attempted to acquire or neutralize competition from other railroads in New England, including the New York Central's Boston and Albany Railroad, the Rutland Railroad, the Maine Central Railroad, and the Boston and Maine Railroad. But the Morgan-Mellen expansion left the company overextended and financially weak. In 1914, 21 directors and ex-directors of the railroad were indicted for "conspiracy to monopolize interstate commerce by acquiring the control of practically all the transportation facilities of New England."

To better handle its freight operations, the railroad greatly expanded its Cedar Hill Yard in the New Haven area, completing the work in 1925 on what was the largest classification yard in the United States east of the Mississippi River. The new facilities served as the hub of the system and handled the sorting of freight cars with two hump yards along with the maintenance of locomotives and railroad cars, and also contained both a transloading facility and a plant for adding creosote to railroad ties. Expansions to Hartford Yard and Northup Avenue Yard in Providence, Rhode Island, both also equipped as hump yards, were completed in 1929, when both yards were equipped with retarders along with Cedar Hill to assist in safely sorting freight cars.

In 1925, the railroad created the New England Transportation Company as a subsidiary to operate buses and trucks on routes where rail service was no longer profitable.

Growing competition from road transport and the effects of the Great Depression caused the New Haven to sharply cut passenger services from branch lines. Of the 2,185 route miles with passenger service in 1920, more than 1,000 miles (1,600 km) saw that service eliminated by 1934.

=== First bankruptcy and recovery (1935–1954) ===
Revenue passenger traffic, in millions of passenger-miles, incl CNE
Year	Traffic
1925	1810
1933	916
1944	3794
1948	2223
1960	1291
1967	954

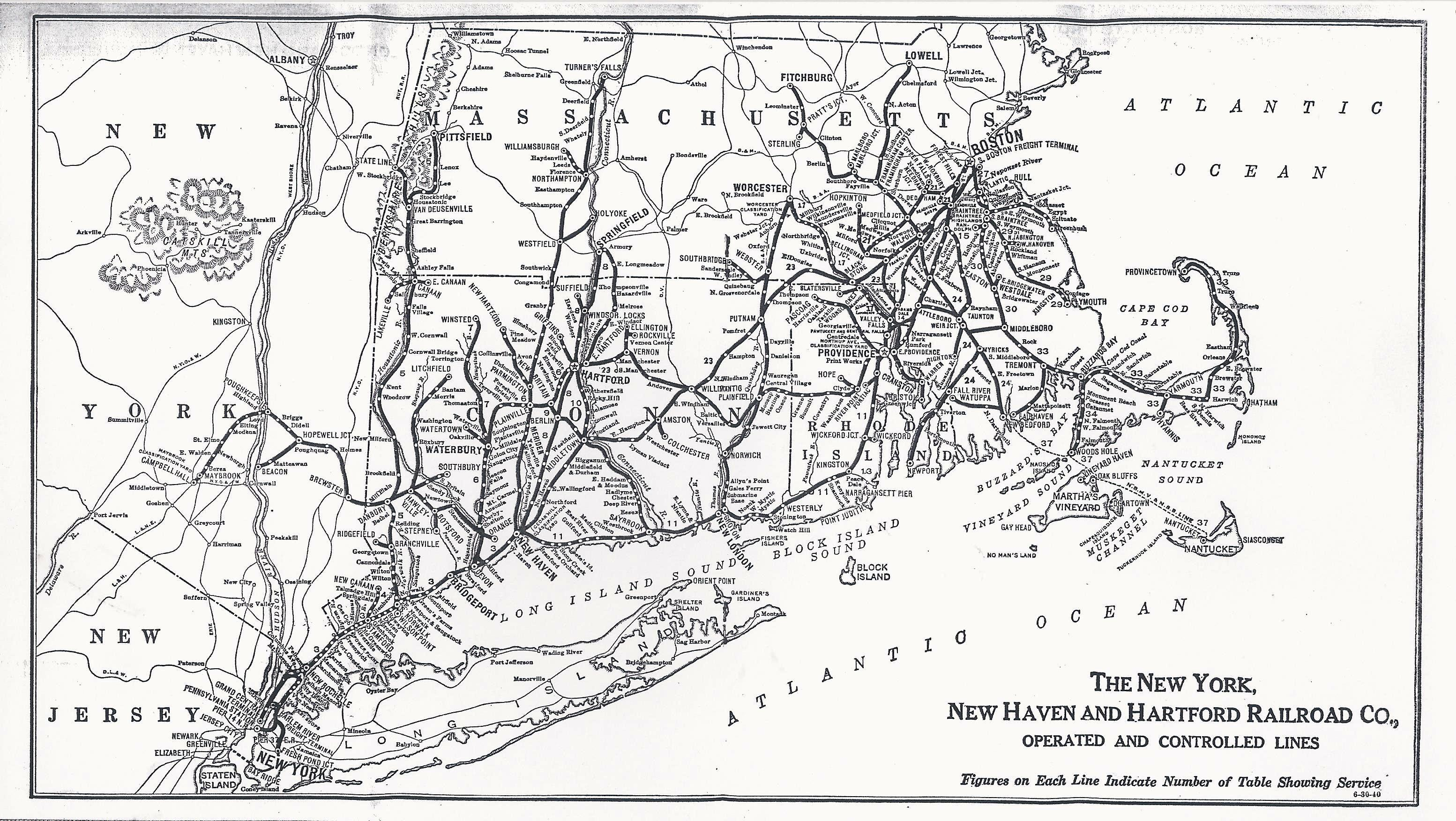
A 1940 map of the railroad shows evidence of cuts to the CNE, Old Colony, and various branches.

Under the stress of the Great Depression the company became bankrupt in 1935, remaining in trusteeship until 1947. Common stock was voided and creditors assumed control. During the 88 stations case, the railroad closed 88 stations in Massachusetts and 5 in Rhode Island in 1938, and unsuccessfully attempted to abandon the Boston-area portion of the Old Colony Division. The twelve-year reorganization resulted in "eight Supreme Court decisions, fourteen circuit court decisions, five district court decisions, and eleven ICC reports." During the reorganization, over $300 million (equivalent to $4.2×10^{9} in 2024) was invested in capital improvement, including locomotives and other rolling stock, tracks, bridges, and railroad facilities.

Several lines were abandoned during the bankruptcy, most significantly a large portion of the CNE in New York and Connecticut. Other than the line from Maybrook across the Hudson to Poughkeepsie, the only parts to survive were a trio of segments in Connecticut. Over 180 miles (290 km) were cut from the former CNE. The former Old Colony network in the Boston area was also rationalized to eliminate lines that duplicated others, and a variety of branches across the entire New Haven network that saw little traffic were shortened or abandoned entirely. In total, over 300 route miles (480 km) were abandoned by 1938.

The railroad emerged in September 1947 under a reorganization plan approved in federal court, without the vast majority of its previous non-railroad interests, and with a number of unprofitable passenger operations on marginal branches replaced with bus service.

Dieselization took place rapidly following the end of World War II. The railroad had more than 500 steam locomotives in active service in 1941; this number fell to less than 50 by late 1949. Steam locomotives were phased out of regular service entirely in 1952, earlier than many other American railroads. A few steam locomotives were kept beyond this date for passenger excursions. Replacing steam power were a variety of products from the American Locomotive Company (ALCO), primarily PA and FA locomotives for mainline trains and RS-1, RS-2, and RS-3 road switcher locomotives for general use. Along with ten locomotives ordered from Fairbanks-Morse, the New Haven ordered 161 new diesels between the end of the war and 1951. The arrival of diesels made it possible for the railroad to close numerous facilities dedicated to maintaining steam locomotives or keeping them supplied with water and coal.

In 1948, the company operated 644 locomotives, 1,602 passenger cars and 8,796 freight cars on 1,581 miles of track. New leadership and equipment positioned the railroad for a successful future, cut short when former chairman Frederic C. Dumaine took over the company in May 1948 after gaining control of a large portion of the railroad's stock. The 82 year old Dumaine slashed spending, sharply increased dividend payments, and began targeting anyone in management he felt was too well compensated. Passenger service frequencies were reduced as a cost-cutting measure. The company's revenue shrunk by fifteen percent in 1949 before the Korean War increased economic activity.

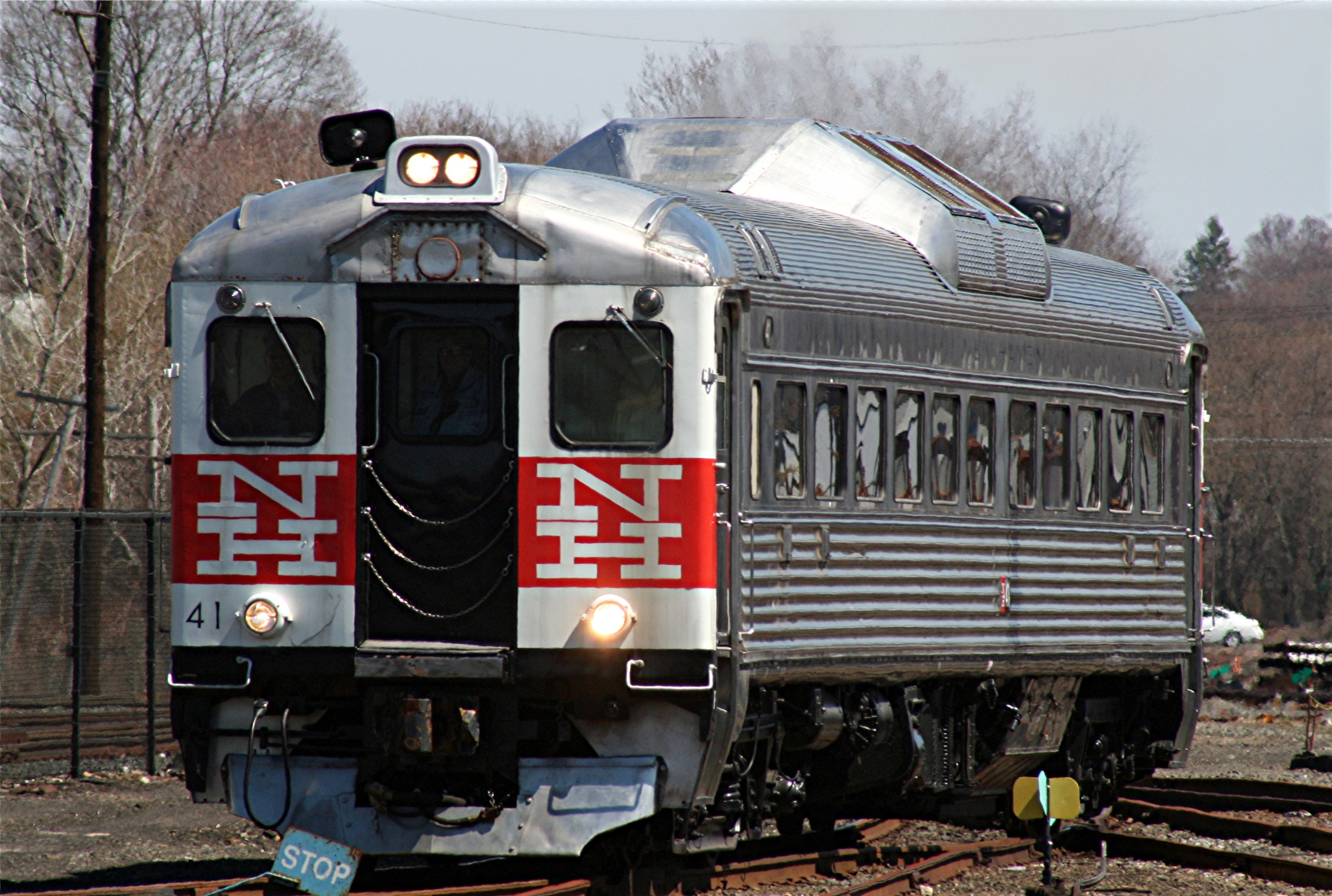
A New Haven Budd Rail Diesel Car preserved at the Danbury Railway Museum

Frederic C. "Buck" Dumaine Jr. succeeded his father after his death in 1951 and took the company in a different direction, putting money back into maintaining the railroad and adding more passenger services instead of cutting them. Under his administration, the railroad invested heavily in new passenger equipment, including Budd Rail Diesel Cars (RDCs), 100 new electric multiple units for commuter service between New York City and Stamford, and ten EP-5 electric locomotives from General Electric. Perception of the railroad shifted positively as a result.

=== McGinnis era and financial troubles (1954–1961) ===
NH logo created by Herbert Matter during the McGinnis era (1954–1956)

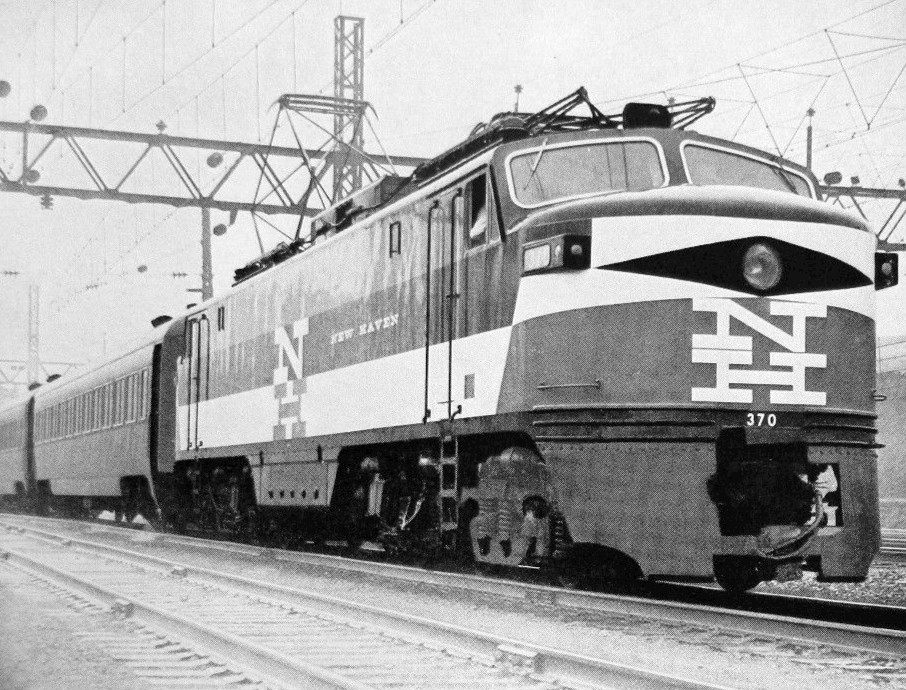
One of the railroad's new EP-5 electric locomotives in 1955

In 1954, businessman and stock speculator Patrick B. McGinnis led a proxy fight against incumbent president Buck Dumaine Jr., vowing to return more of the company's profit to shareholders. McGinnis had previously allied with Buck Dumaine's father during the 1948 takeover, and his proxy fight followed a failed takeover attempt in 1953. He won control of the railroad and appointed Arthur V. McGowan, a longtime acquaintance, Vice President. McGinnis attempted to accomplish many of his financial goals by deferring all but the most essential maintenance. The railroad's new president considered himself a visionary who would save the company by adopting new ideas.

McGinnis decided the railroad needed a refreshed corporate image, and so Knoll Associates was retained to design a new visual identity for the company. Herbert Matter developed a new color scheme featuring black, red-orange, and white to replace the railroad's existing green, yellow, and orange colors. Matter also designed a new logo consisting of the block letters "NH" arranged vertically, known as the McGinnis logo, to replace its previous script herald. McGinnis ordered the new colors and logo applied to the EP-5 locomotives ordered by his predecessor, the first of a wide variety of locomotives, passenger cars, and freight cars both new and existing to be painted in the railroad's new image. Knoll employed architect Marcel Breuer to design the interiors and exterior styling of the three experimental trainsets – the Dan'l Webster, John Quincy Adams, and Roger Williams – that were ordered in 1955. Breuer also designed new station buildings for Rye and New London, neither of which were built, as well as the interior of a never-built design for articulated commuter coaches. McGinnis himself could be found touring the railroad on his hirail equipped Cadillac and encouraging thrift on the part of employees even as his own compensation skyrocketed.

Both the railroad's fleet of electric locomotives and its Cos Cob Power Station that supplied them with electricity were in need of improvements, but McGinnis ignored recommendations to do so in favor of severe reductions to their maintenance budgets. Rather than invest in its existing electric trains and infrastructure, the railroad instead ordered more than 100 new diesel locomotives from three manufacturers, including 30 FL9 locomotives from General Motors Electro-Motive Division (EMD). The FL9s were electro-diesel locomotives that could operate on electric power in the area of Grand Central Terminal and on diesel power elsewhere. They played into McGinnis' plans to abandon most of the railroad's electrification system in favor of diesel locomotives, keeping it only between New York City and Stamford for electrified commuter service.

When McGinnis departed in 1956, ejected from leadership by furious stockholders, he left the company financially wrecked, a situation exacerbated by a major derailment of the Federal in Bridgeport, Connecticut, in July 1955 and severe damage from the 1955 Connecticut floods which permanently severed a route between Boston and Hartford. McGinnis proceeded to similarly damage the Boston and Maine Railroad before ending up in federal prison.

The experimental trainsets promoted by McGinnis were failures when they arrived between 1956 and 1957: their fixed length meant they could not be adjusted based on demand, they were highly unreliable in service, and they failed to provide a smooth ride for passengers. Of the three, only the Roger Williams lasted more than a year in operation.

The railroad's next and final president was George Alpert, a lawyer and previously a member of the railroad's board of directors. One of his first acts as president was the downwards correction of income statistics previously issued by his predecessor which were not reflective of the railroad's real finances. Alpert recognized that he had inherited a railroad with deferred maintenance and succeeded in securing loans from the Interstate Commerce Commission (ICC) to repair its tracks along with ordering regular spending on maintenance increased. The railroad was unsuccessful in addressing the increasing age of its rolling stock, made worse by the shuttering of locomotive maintenance facilities at Readville (diesel) and Van Nest (electric) which overwhelmed the facilities at Cedar Hill Yard in New Haven. To cut costs, locomotives sent for rebuilding returned with a simplified two-tone paint scheme in place of the more elaborate and expensive McGinnis colors. The completion of the Connecticut Turnpike parallel to the railroad's main line between New York and Boston in 1958 and growing competition from jet aircraft began to heavily effect the railroad's passenger and freight business, to the extent that a quarter of the railroad's trains between the two cities were cut from the schedule.

Alpert strongly advocated for government action to resolve inequitable taxation, with other modes of transportation exempted from taxes while the railroad paid massive tax bills on structures like Boston South Station. His solution was to attempt to convince the public that government funding was necessary to prevent unprofitable commuter rail service from collapsing entirely. On June 30, 1959, the New Haven discontinued passenger service on the Old Colony Railroad network in southeastern Massachusetts after the state refused to continue subsidizing the company's operating losses. That year, the company reported close to $11 million in losses. Asked by the Connecticut Public Utilities Commission in February 1960 if the company's survival was in imminent danger, the New Haven's comptroller replied, "Yes, even with the best of management". 30 additional FL9s were delivered by EMD in 1960 and replaced many older locomotives, but this was only made possible via government-supported loans to the railroad.

=== Second bankruptcy (1961–1969) ===
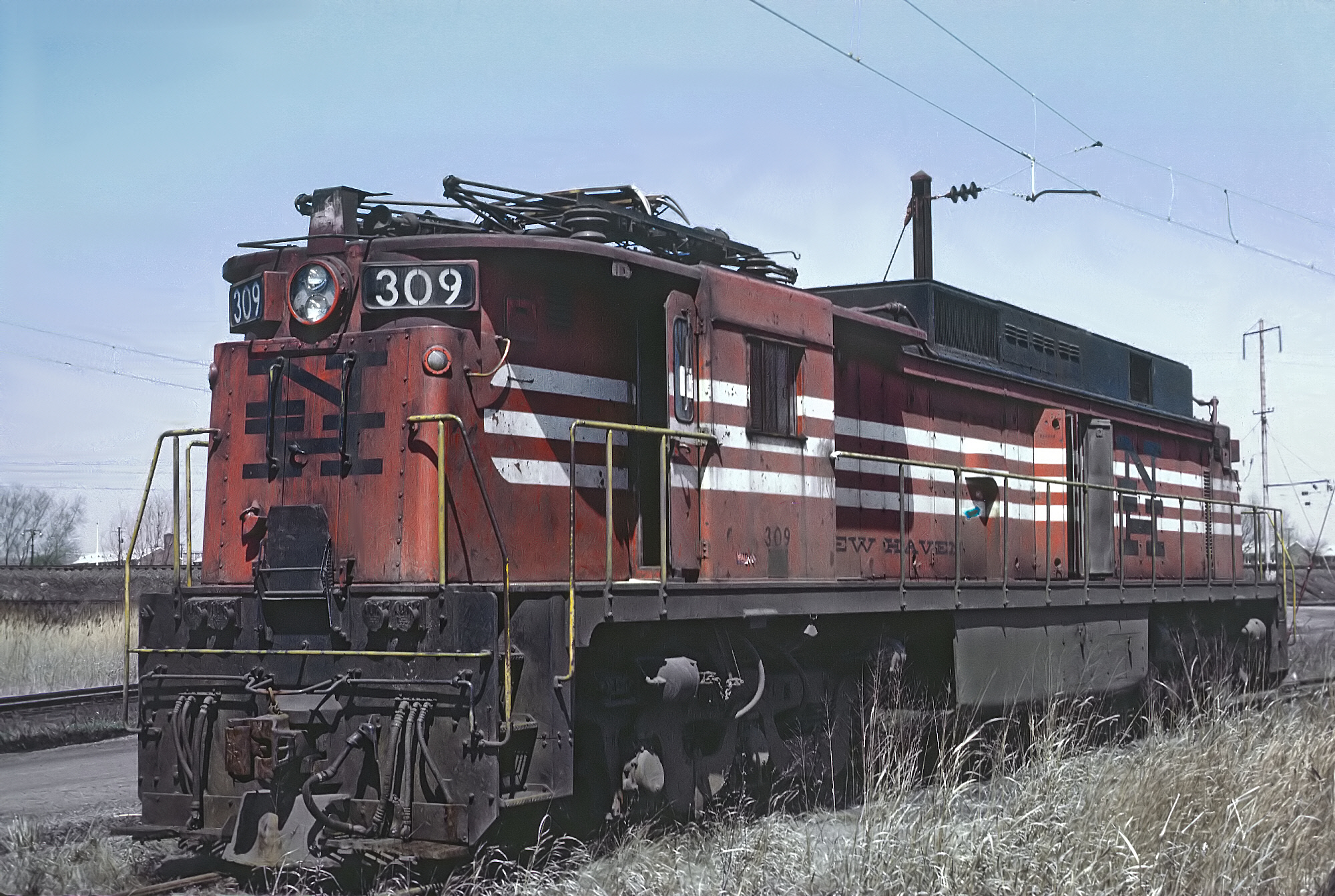
One of the EF-4 electric locomotives purchased by the trustees, photographed in 1969

Continuing financial problems forced the New Haven into bankruptcy on July 7, 1961, and federal court judge Robert P. Anderson assumed trusteeship. The railroad reported it would have only $9,262,000 in funds to cover expenses of $33,480,000 at the year's end. Company president George Alpert blamed "government subsidies direct and indirect to our competitors, and inequitable taxes" for the railroad's deficits, pointing to billions of dollars in federal funding for highways and airports. A final attempt to stave off bankruptcy through Defense Production Act of 1950 funding was torpedoed by Senator A. Willis Robertson's insistence that hearings be held before any money was committed. Trains Magazine editor David P. Morgan's analysis of the bankruptcy in 1961 concluded that the company was doomed; continuing that "The only question remaining is whether the taxpayer or the bondholder is to lose his shirt".

Under the management of the bankruptcy trustees, the move initiated by the McGinnis administration and continued by Alpert to turn away from electrification was reversed. The railroad's costly Cos Cob power station was much more affordable to run when its power was used outside of the morning and evening rush hours, based on calculations completed by the trustees. 11 EF-4 electric locomotives, only a few years old, were purchased from the Norfolk and Western Railway for a bargain price of $300,000 and put to work handling freight trains. The previously sidelined EP-5 electric locomotives were rebuilt and returned to service. 26 GE U25B and 10 ALCO C425 diesel locomotives were purchased by the trustees between 1964 and 1965, the railroad's last new locomotives. Prior management had been reluctant to abandon lines since the previous bankruptcy, but the trustees eliminated approximately 200 miles (320 km) of routes which provided minimal or zero revenue for the railroad. This represented over ten percent of the New Haven system.

The trustees asked the ICC in June 1962 to mandate that the New Haven be included in the merger of the New York Central Railroad (NYC) and Pennsylvania Railroad (PRR), an active proposal at the time. The other two railroads agreed to this condition in March 1965, with the stipulation that the highly unprofitable New Haven passenger operations not be included. The ICC rejected this proposal, and NYC and PRR later agreed to assume operation of passenger services as well. As the details of a potential merger were worked out, the bankruptcy trustees did their best to keep the railroad from collapsing entirely, but were stymied by how little money was available to address years of prior mismanagement and neglect. With finances deteriorating and no relief in sight, the trustees eventually threatened to liquidate the entire railroad.

Revenue freight traffic, in millions of net ton-miles (incl CNE but not NY Conn)
Year	Traffic
1925	3119
1933	2178
1944	5806
1948	4267
1960	2809
1967	2928

=== Merger with Penn Central (1969–1976) ===
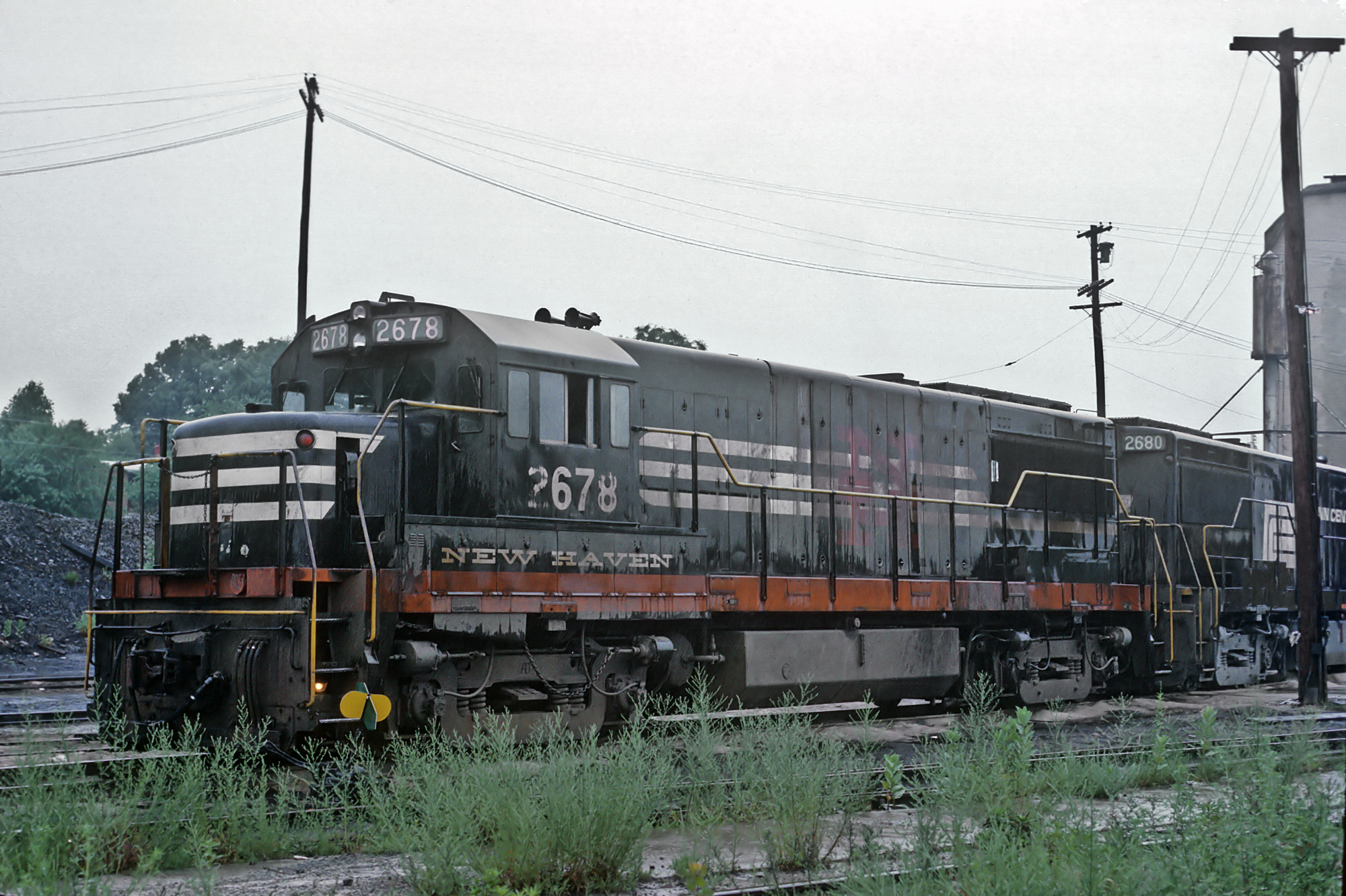
Penn Central took over a seriously neglected railroad, as demonstrated by this former New Haven GE U25B locomotive in 1970

At the insistence of the Interstate Commerce Commission, the New Haven was merged into Penn Central on December 31, 1968, ending rail operations by the corporation. Penn Central was bankrupt by 1970 and the New Haven corporate entity remained in existence throughout the 1970s as the Trustee of the Estate pursued just payment from Penn Central for the New Haven's assets. Leased by the New Haven since before 1900, the Providence and Worcester Railroad (P&W) successfully exited its lease under Penn Central and resumed operating its own line in 1973.

A substantial portion of the former New Haven main line between New York and Boston was transferred to Amtrak in 1976 and now forms the northern leg of the electrified Northeast Corridor, hosting high-speed Acela Express and regional rail service. The main line between New Rochelle and New Haven is jointly owned by the state of Connecticut and the Metropolitan Transportation Authority of New York, and is served by the Metro-North Railroad’s New Haven Line and Shore Line East, providing commuter service from Manhattan’s Grand Central Terminal as far eastward as New London, Connecticut. The New Haven Line is coded red on Metro-North timetables and system maps, a nod to the red livery used by the New Haven for the last decade of its history. MBTA's Providence/Stoughton Line provides commuter service between Providence and South Station in Boston.

Amtrak took over passenger service on the New Haven–Springfield Line in 1976, and was joined by the state of Connecticut's Hartford Line in 2018.

On August 28, 1980, American Financial Enterprises, Inc., acquired the remaining assets of the New York, New Haven and Hartford Railroad Company when the plan for reorganization was approved by the court and the company was reorganized. This brought to an end the 108-year corporate history of the storied railroad, and the end to the 19-year saga of its second bankruptcy reorganization. American Financial Enterprises would become the largest single stockholder of Penn Central Company shares by the mid-1990s, controlling 32% of the stock of the company.

=== The Conrail era and beyond (1976–present) ===
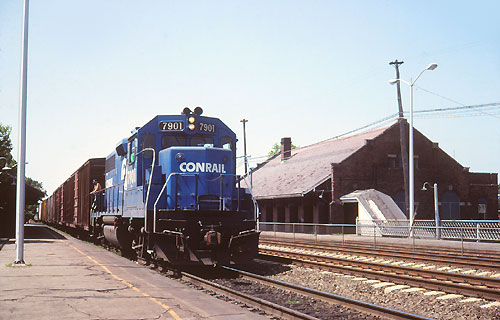
A Conrail train in Attleboro, Massachusetts, in 1983. Conrail inherited much of the former New Haven network with a mandate to return it to profitable operation.

Freight operations on former New Haven lines passed to Conrail with its government-overseen creation on April 1, 1976. During the subsequent 23 years, Conrail withdrew from much of that territory, abandoning some track and handing other lines over to the Providence & Worcester, Bay Colony, Boston & Maine, Connecticut Central, Pioneer Valley, Housatonic and Connecticut Southern railroads. Those lines still operated by Conrail in 1999 became part of CSX Transportation as the result of the breakup of the Conrail system. These changes effectively broke up the near monopoly on freight railroads in southern New England that the New Haven once held. The state of Connecticut frequently alludes to the New Haven in its modern transportation projects; much of the state’s commuter equipment is painted in McGinnis-era livery, while the iconic "NH" logo appears on everything from rolling stock, station signage, to tourism materials for the city of New Haven itself.

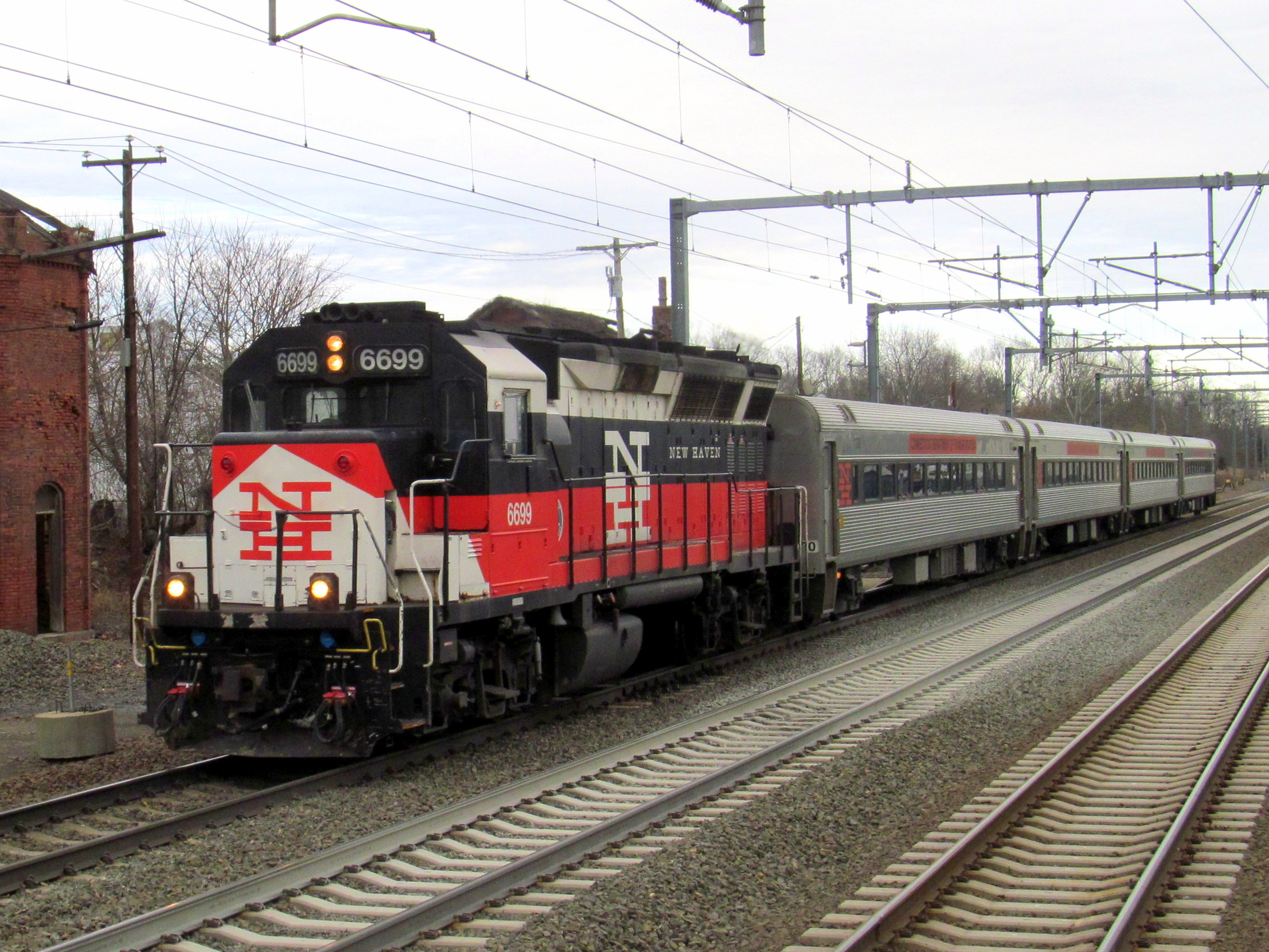
A GP40 in Shore Line East service in 2015, painted in New Haven colors to commemorate the former railroad.

The Connecticut Department of Transportation has painted its diesel commuter rail locomotives used on the non-electrified Danbury and Waterbury Metro-North branches, as well as its Shore Line East operation, in the "McGinnis Scheme," composed of white, black, and orange-red stripes with the iconic NH logo. Although a new livery was introduced with the opening of the Hartford Line commuter service in 2018, much of its equipment is shared with Shore Line East, of which some continue to bear the McGinnis livery and the rest have been repainted into the new "CT Rail" livery. All of these lines were formerly owned by the New Haven.

The Valley Railroad, a preservation line based in Essex, Connecticut that runs both steam and diesel traction, has painted the authentic script-lettering insignia of the original "New York, New Haven and Hartford" railroad on the tenders of its resident steam locomotives, 2-8-0 Consolidation type Number 97 and 2-8-2 Mikado type number 40. There is a third steam locomotive in restoration to running order; a Chinese SY-class Mikado, formerly known as the 1658, it is being renumbered and painted as New Haven 3025, and is to be based on a Mikado-type engine that was typical to the New Haven.

The name of the Hartford Yard Goats Minor League Baseball team reflects the old New York, New Haven and Hartford railroad history and the design of its logo is based on the railroad's original script style logo. The team plays in downtown Hartford at Dunkin' Donuts Park, which is adjacent to Hartford Yard, originally built by the New Haven.

== Operations ==
=== Passenger ===
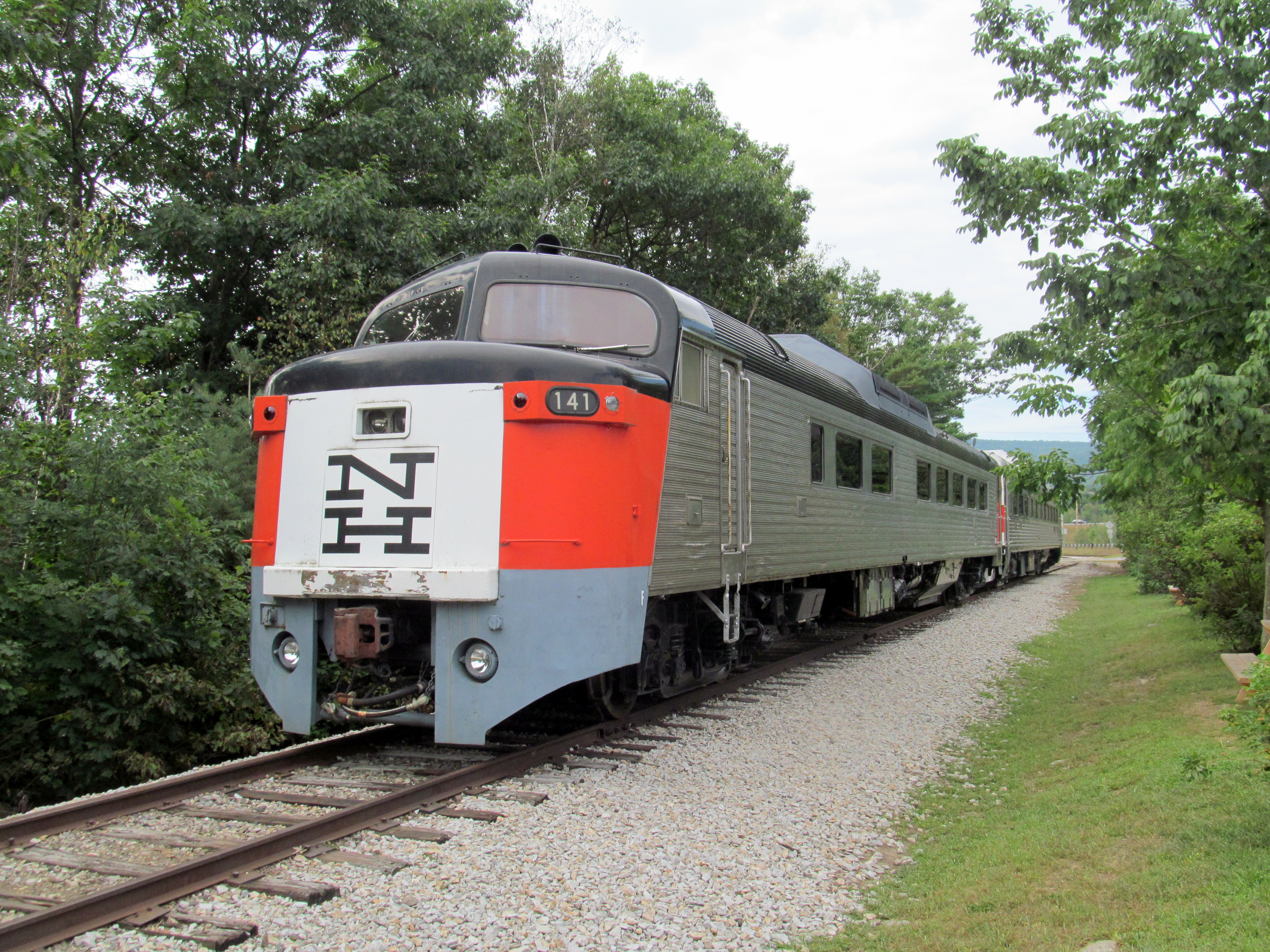
The New Haven's Roger Williams trainset, preserved at the Hobo Railroad

- Passenger trains ran between Grand Central Terminal and Boston's South Station via Providence, Springfield or Willimantic.
- Several passenger trains a day, including the overnight Federal, ran between Washington, D.C. and New York (Penn Station) via PRR and on to Boston.
- Passenger service operated from Grand Central Terminal to Hartford, Springfield and beyond.
- The premier New York–Boston passenger service was the Merchants Limited, leaving Grand Central and South Station simultaneously at 5 PM. Also prominent was the Yankee Clipper, with 1 PM departures. For many years these trains carried no coaches, only parlor cars, dining and lounge cars.

NH introduced ideas for passenger rail travel, including early use of restaurant and parlor cars in the steam era, and more during the transition to diesel. NH was a pioneer in many ways; in streamliners with the Comet, in the use of diesel multiple units (DMUs) in the U.S. with both Budd's regular Budd Rail Diesel Cars (RDCs) and the all-RDC Roger Williams trainset, in the use of rail-adapted buses, in lightweight trains such as the Train-X-equipped Dan'l Webster, and in experimentation with Talgo-type (passive tilt) equipment on the train John Quincy Adams.

An audacious experiment was the UAC TurboTrain, which with passive tilt, turbine engines and light weight attempted to revolutionize medium—distance railway travel in the U.S. Sponsored by the U.S. Department of Transportation, the Turbo Train holds the U.S. railway speed record of 170 mph, set in 1968. The NH never operated the Turbo in revenue service, as the NH was purchased by PC, which operated the train.

Other passenger trains:

- Ambassador (New York-Montreal)
- Bankers (New York–Springfield)
- Bar Harbor Express (Washington, D.C.-Ellsworth, Maine) (overnight; all-Pullman) (summer only)
- Bay State (New York–Boston)
- Berkshire (New York–Danbury–Pittsfield)
- Bostonian (New York–Boston)
- Buttermilk Bay (Boston-Hyannis, and -Woods Hole)
- Colonial (Washington–Boston)
- Commander (New York–Boston)
- Connecticut Yankee (New York-Quebec City) via Boston & Maine (B&M), Quebec Central Railway
- Cranberry (Boston-Hyannis, and -Woods Hole)
- Dan'l Webster (New York–Boston)
- Day Cape Codder (New York–Hyannis/Woods Hole) (summer only)
- Day White Mountains (New York–Berlin, New Hampshire via B&M)
- East Wind (Washington, D.C.–Portland, Maine, via PRR and B&M) (summer only)
- Federal (Washington, D.C.–Boston) (overnight)
- Forty–Second Street (New York–Boston)
- Gilt Edge (New York–Boston)
- Hell Gate Express (New York (Penn Station)–Boston)
- Housatonic (New York–Danbury–Pittsfield)
- Litchfield (New York–Danbury–Pittsfield)
- Mayflower (New York–Boston)
- Merchants Limited (New York–Boston)
- Montrealer (Washington, D.C.–Montreal, via PRR, Canadian National (CN), Central Vermont Railway (CV), and B&M) (overnight)
- Murray Hill (New York–Boston)
- Narragansett (New York–Boston) (overnight)
- Nathan Hale (New York–White River Junction) (overnight)
- Naugatuck (New York–Winsted, Connecticut)
- Neptune (New York–Hyannis/Woods Hole) (summer only)
- New Yorker (New York–Boston)
- Night Cape Codder (New York–Hyannis/Woods Hole) (overnight, summer only)
- Night White Mountains (Washington, D.C.-Bretton Woods) (overnight, summer only)
- North Wind (New York-Bretton Woods) (summer only)
- Nutmeg (Boston-Franklin-Hartford-Waterbury)
- Owl (New York–Boston) (overnight)
- Patriot (Washington, D.C.–Boston)
- Pilgrim (Philadelphia–Boston) (overnight)
- Puritan (New York–Boston)
- Quaker (Philadelphia–Boston) (overnight)
- Sand Dune (Boston-Hyannis, and -Woods Hole)
- Senator (Washington, D.C.–Boston)
- Shoreliner (New York–Boston)
- State of Maine (New York–Portland/Bangor via B&M and Maine Central Railroad or MEC) (overnight)
- Valley Express (New York-White River Junction)
- Washingtonian (Montreal–Washington, D.C., via PRR, CN, CV and B&M) (overnight)
- William Penn (Philadelphia–Boston) (overnight)
- Yankee Clipper (New York–Boston)

=== Commuter ===
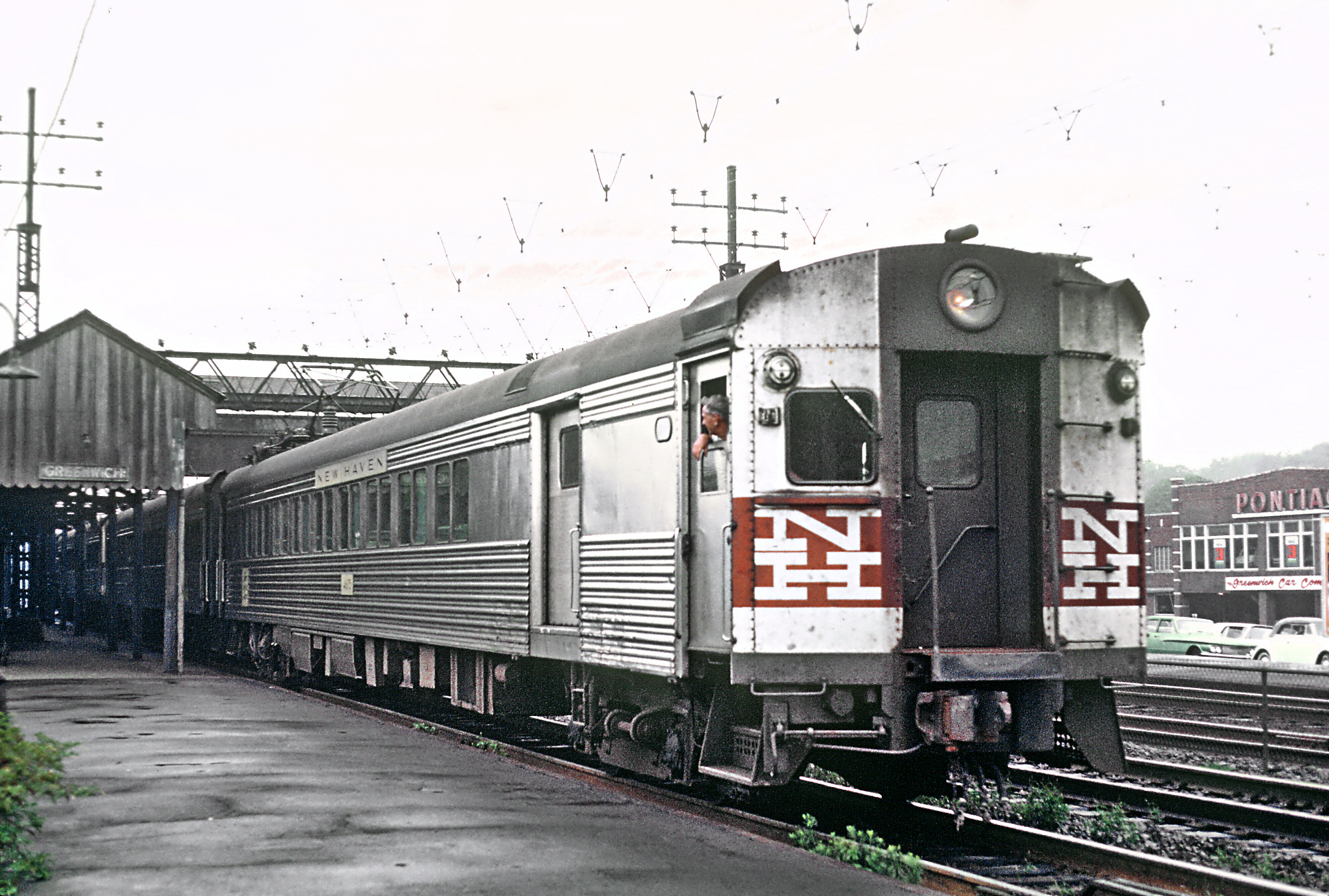
- Electric multiple units in commuter service at Greenwich station in 1964
  Commuter service from New York ran through New Rochelle to Stamford, New Canaan, Danbury (and on to Pittsfield), and through Bridgeport to New Haven and Waterbury (and on to Hartford and Winsted).
- Commuter service from Boston went to destinations on the OC system of Greenbush, Plymouth, Brockton/Campello, Middleboro, Hyannis/Woods Hole on Cape Cod, Fall River, Newport, New Bedford and Providence, Woonsocket, Needham Heights, West Medway and Dedham.

==== Yale Bowl trains ====
Beginning November 21, 1914, the railroad operated special trains to bring football fans to and from the new Yale Bowl stadium in New Haven. Passengers rode extra trains from Springfield, Boston, and especially New York to the New Haven Union Station, where they transferred to trolleys for the 2-mile (3.2 km) ride to the Bowl. On November 21, 1922, for example, such trains carried more than 50,000 passengers. "There is nothing which can be compared with the New Haven's football movement except a record of one of the mass-movements incidental to the European war," one observer wrote in 1916.

=== Freight ===
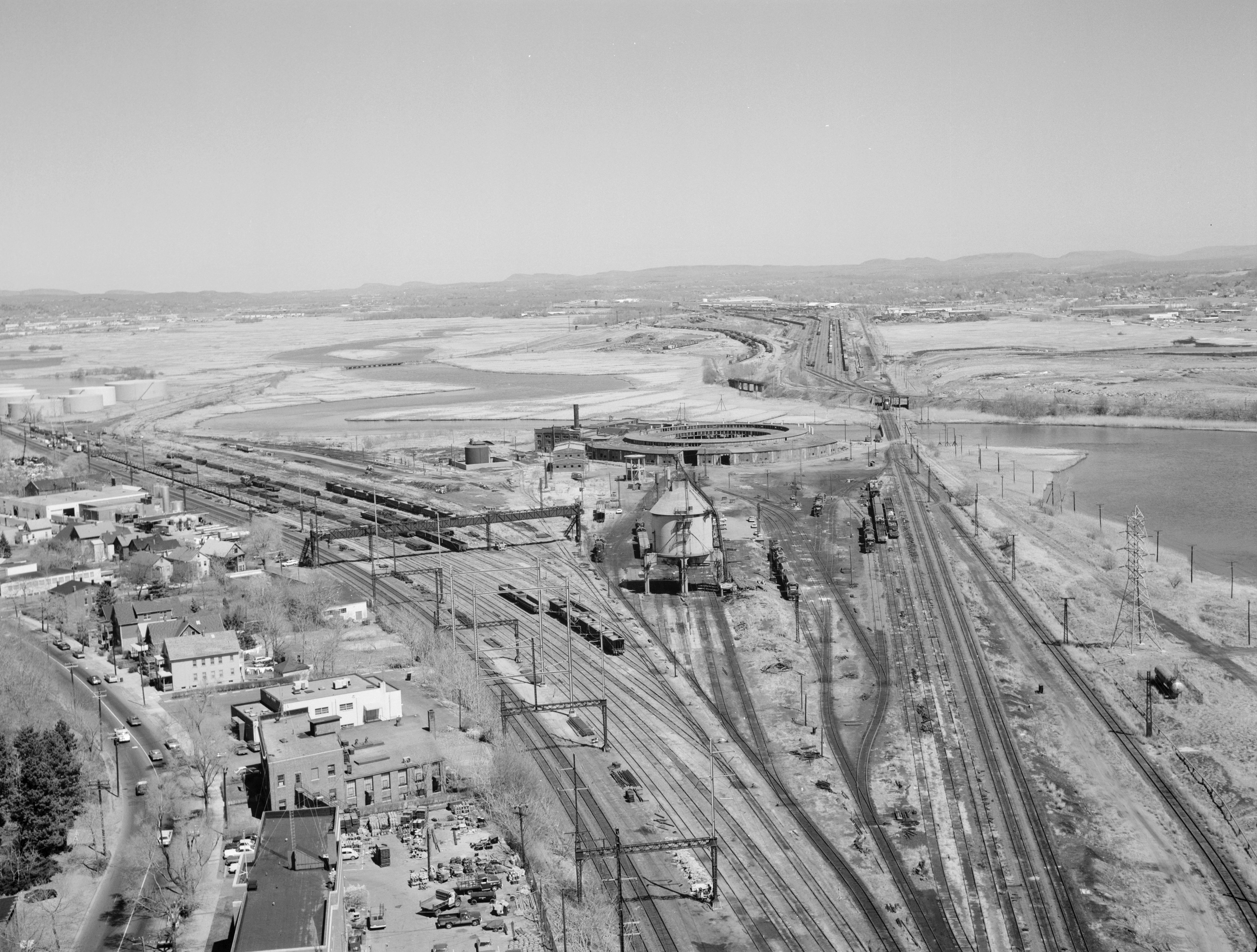
Cedar Hill Yard, seen in 1977 under successor Conrail, was the largest rail yard on the New Haven system

- Major freight yards were at South Boston, Taunton, Fall River, New Bedford, Providence (Northup Avenue Yard), Worcester, Springfield, Hartford, Waterbury, New Haven (the major Cedar Hill hump classification yard), Maybrook (another hump yard and interchange point for western connections), New York Harlem River and New York Bay Ridge (where interchange was made with the PRR and other railroads in New Jersey, via barge (car float)).
- Multiple through freight trains traveled at night between New York or Maybrook and Cedar Hill yard and on to Boston. Other through freights served the yards above as well as intermediate points and also State Line (New York Central interchange), Brockton, Framingham and Lowell (B&M interchange for traffic for Taunton, New Bedford and Fall River).

== Company officers ==
Name	From	To	Term	Notes
William D. Bishop	July 24, 1872	February 1879	6y/6m	
George H. Watrous	February 1879	March 1887	8y/1m	
Charles P. Clark	March 1887	November 1899	12y/8m	
John Manning Hall	November 1899	October 31, 1903	4y	
Charles S. Mellen	October 31, 1903	January 9, 1913	9y/8m	Also chairman
Howard Elliott	January 9, 1913	October 22, 1913	1m/22d	Also chairman
James H. Hustis	October 22, 1913	August 15, 1914	9m/25d	
Howard Elliott	August 15, 1914	January 5, 1917	2y/8m	Also chairman
Edward Jones Pearson	January 5, 1917	March 21, 1918	10m	Also chairman
Edward G. Buckland	March 21, 1918	February 29, 1920	1y/11m	Also chairman
Edward Jones Pearson	February 29, 1920	November 27, 1928	8y/8m	Also chairman
Edward G. Buckland	March 1, 1929	January 3, 1929	2m	Also chairman
John J. Pelley	January 3, 1929	January 11, 1934	5y/8m	
Howard S. Palmer	January 11, 1934	August 11, 1948	14y/7m	Longest term
Frederic C. Dumaine Sr.	August 11, 1948	August 31, 1948	20d	Also chairman; shortest term
Laurence F. Whittemore	August 31, 1948	December 21, 1949	1y/3m	
Frederic C. Dumaine Sr.	December 21, 1949	May 27, 1951	1y/5m	Also chairman
Frederic C. "Buck" Dumaine Jr.	May 27, 1951	January 4, 1954	2y/10m	Also chairman
Patrick B. McGinnis	January 4, 1954	January 18, 1956	1y/9m	
George Alpert	January 18, 1956	July 7, 1961	5y/5m	Also chairman

== See also ==
- EMD FL9 – a dual-power electro-diesel locomotive
- FM P-12-42 – a streamlined locomotive
- Joy Steamship Company
- List of New York, New Haven and Hartford Railroad precursors
