= John J. Pelley =

American railroad executive (1878–1946)

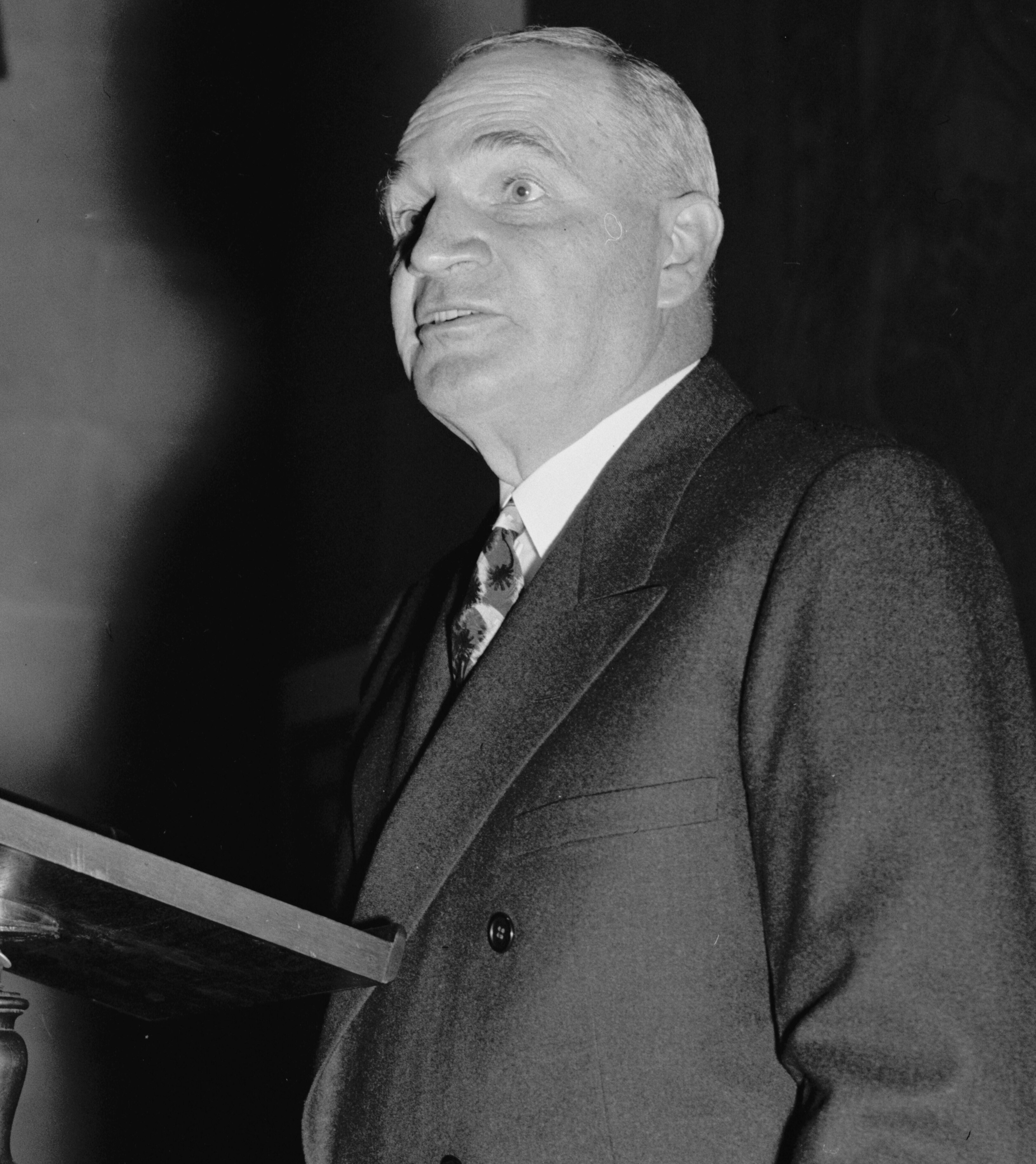
- Pelley in 1938
- Born: John Jeremiah Pelley; May 1, 1878; Anna, Illinois, U.S.
- Died: November 12, 1946 (aged 68); Washington, D.C., U.S.
- Resting place: Cedar Hill Cemetery
- Education: University of Illinois
- Occupation: Railroad executive
- Spouse: Alma Ethel Thompson (m. 1908)
- Children: 1

John Jeremiah Pelley (May 1, 1878 – November 12, 1946) was an American railroad executive. He started as station clerk of the Illinois Central Railroad, and rose up the ranks to become the railroad's vice president in charge of operations. He then served as president of the Central of Georgia Railway from 1926 to 1929 and president of the New York, New Haven and Hartford Railroad from 1929 to 1934. From 1934 to his death, he served as president of the Association of American Railroads.

== Early life ==
John Jeremiah Pelley was born on May 1, 1878, in Anna, Illinois, to Mary (née Anders) and Joseph Pelley. His father served in the Confederate Army. Pelley was educated at public schools in Anna and graduated from Anna High School and was captain of the school's football team. He attended the University of Illinois. He taught algebra and geometry at Anna High School for three years.

== Career ==
In 1899, Pelley began work as a station clerk for the Illinois Central Railroad in Anna. He was then clerk at Carbondale from 1900 to 1901. He was a track apprentice and assistant foreman of another gang in 1901. He was appointed as foreman and general foreman of the construction gang for a branch line between Reevesville and Golconda in 1903 and then became supervisor of the Peoria district in 1904. In 1905, he transferred to the Memphis division of the Illinois Central and served as assistant roadmaster in Clarksdale from 1906 to 1907. From 1908 to 1910, he was roadmaster and worked in McComb, Mississippi. In 1910, he moved to New Orleans and in 1911, he moved to Fulton, Kentucky, continuing to work as roadmaster of the Memphis division. He was then promoted to superintendent and remained in Fulton until he moved to Memphis, Tennessee, in 1915 to continue as superintendent. In 1915, he was appointed superintendent of Yazoo and Mississippi Valley Railroad. On August 1, 1917, he became general superintendent of the southern lines of Illinois Central. He was appointed as general superintendent of the northern lines of Illinois Central in 1919. From 1920 to 1923, he was chairman of the committee on car service (later merged into the Association of American Railroads) in Chicago. He was the general manager of the Illinois Central from 1923 to 1924 and then served as vice president in charge of operations of the line until September 15, 1926.

In 1926, Pelley succeeded Lawrence A. Downs as president of the Central of Georgia Railway, a subsidiary of Illinois Central, and the Ocean Steamship Company of Savannah, Georgia. He served as president until February 1929 and was succeeded by Albert Earl Clift. Pelley then served as president of the New York, New Haven and Hartford Railroad, succeeding Edward J. Pearson, until 1934.

In July 1933, Pelley, a Republican, was named by President Franklin D. Roosevelt to a Connecticut advisory board to administer Connecticut's share of federal public works appropriation under the National Industrial Recovery Act of 1933. On October 12, 1934, he joined the Association of American Railroads as its first president and continued in that role until his death. He was a director of Western Union, the Equitable Life Assurance Society, and Washington Properties Inc. During World War II, he was a liaison between government agencies and railroads.

== Personal life ==
Pelley married Alma Ethel Thompson of Golconda on August 22, 1908. They had a daughter, Mary Jane. He was an avid golfer. He was a member of New Haven Country Club, Quinnipack Club, the Knights of Columbus, Chicago Traffic Club, Algonquin Club, and the The Elks. In 1926, he lived on Hyde Park Boulevard in Chicago. Then, he was a member of the South Shore Country Club and the Olympia Fields Country Club. The family lived on Prospect Street in New Haven, Connecticut. In 1946, he lived at Wardman Park Hotel in Washington, D.C.

Pelley had an operation at Doctors' Hospital in Washington, D.C., in late October or early November 1946. He died two weeks later at the hospital on November 12. He was buried at Cedar Hill Cemetery in Maryland.

== Awards and recognition ==
Pelley was on the front page of Time magazine on February 8, 1937. In December 1937, it was announced that the railroad station in Anna, Illinois, would be named Pelley Station after him.

In November 1945, Pelley received a certificate of appreciation for his service from the United States Department of War. On March 1, 1946, he received the treasury silver medal for distinguished wartime work. On March 8, 1946, Pelley received a medal for merit from President Harry S. Truman for his coordination with the government during World War II.
