= Patrick B. McGinnis =

Patrick Benedict McGinnis (May 23, 1904–February 20, 1973) was an American railroad executive and financier best known for his presidency of the New York, New Haven and Hartford Railroad and the Boston and Maine Railroad in the 1950s.

== Early life and career ==
McGinnis was born in Palmyra, New York; his father was a track foreman for the New York Central Railroad He graduated from St. Lawrence University in 1926 and studied at several other schools. He worked as clerk for the NYC before moving on to positions with various New York brokerage firms, including Lehman Brothers, and became a specialist in the railroad industry. By 1949 he was senior partner in his own firm, McGinnis & Co. By this time he had branched out into running railroads as well as investing in them. In 1947 he was part of group which gained control of the Norfolk Southern Railway, of which he was named chairman, a position he held until 1952; in that year he briefly assumed chairmanship of the Central of Georgia Railroad.

== New Haven presidency ==
In 1954 he became president of the New York, New Haven and Hartford Railroad after a proxy fight in which the previous president, Frederic C. Dumaine Jr., was ousted. McGinnis was part of the group which had installed Dumaine's father in the same position in 1948. He made substantial changes in his tenure there, the most visible being the introduction of a new black, vermilion, and white livery which was designed by Herbert Matter (not, as is sometimes claimed, by McGinnis’s wife, though she apparently had some input). He also introduced the first set of FL9 locomotives, diesels which could use the electric third rail power to reach Grand Central Terminal in New York City, as well as several lightweight train sets which were intended to improve passenger service speeds. He disdained electrification as outmoded and had intended to discontinue it east of Stamford, Connecticut, and to that end ordered diesels intended to replace the electrics, though the order of EP-5 "jets", rectifier locomotives which had been ordered under the previous administration, had to be pressed into service on their arrival.

These innovations did nothing to improve the railroad's situation. McGinnis continued the practice of maintenance cutbacks, and the new equipment was plagued with technical problems. The 1955 Connecticut floods, the result of two successive hurricanes, damaged the railroad extensively, and permanently cut the line from Hartford to Boston. The massive commuter service into New York suffered greatly, leading to numerous public complaints. The railroad's finances continued to deteriorate, his own board questioned his management, and on January 20, 1956, he resigned.

== Boston and Maine presidency ==
In the meantime his firm had managed to gain control of the Boston and Maine Railroad, and he became its president the same day as his resignation from the New Haven. Here he kept a lower profile, though he once again hired Matter to design a new herald. He remained as president until 1962, afterwards staying on as the unpaid chairman of the board. The railroad struggled financially and shed most of its passenger service; these cuts among others led to state subsidy of commuter service under the Massachusetts Bay Transportation Authority in the years following McGinnis's departure.

It was in this position that McGinnis found himself in legal trouble that would eventually land him in federal court. He had been accused of questionable dealings before: an investigation into his business practices as head of Norfolk Southern was terminated due to his departure from the railroad, and there were accusations of financial mismanagement at the New Haven. In 1965, however, he was accused of accepting kickbacks from a sale of ten B&M passenger cars. His conviction on these charges resulted in an eighteen month prison sentence and a fine of $2500.

== Death ==
He died at his home in Glendale, Ohio on February 20, 1973.
