= Cedar Hill Cemetery (Suitland, Maryland) =

Cemetery in Suitland, Maryland, US

Coordinates: 38°51′46″N 76°56′44.5″W

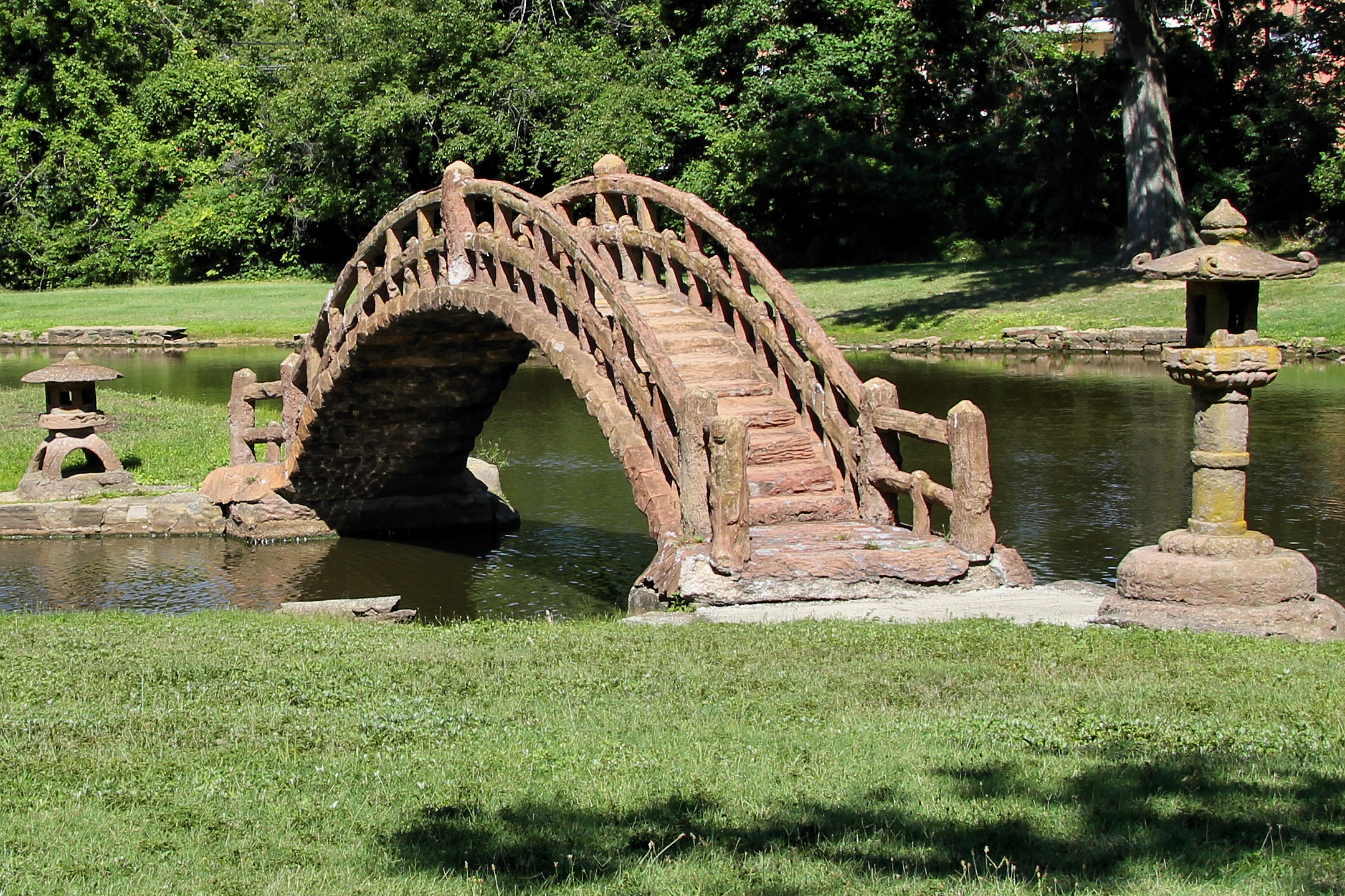
- "The Bridge of Life", one of six pieces built by Dionicio Rodriguez, located on the cemetery grounds.
- Interactive map of Cedar Hill Cemetery

Details
- Established: 1895
- Location: Suitland, Maryland
- Size: 150 acres (61 ha)

Cedar Hill Cemetery, previously known as Forest Lake Cemetery, and also formerly Nonesuch Plantation, is a cemetery located in Suitland, Maryland.

== History ==
Following a series of land purchases starting in 1890, Forest Lake Cemetery was chartered and opened in 1895, but by 1913 few bodies were buried there.

In 1913, after going bankrupt in the wake of a failed 1908 sale to a developer, 130 acres (53 ha) of the 400-acre (160 ha) Forest Lake Cemetery were sold to form the Cedar Hill Cemetery.

Over time, the cemetery was expanded, and it is now over 150 acres (61 ha) in size. The oldest tombstone reads "Philenia W. Patte, Nov. 19, 1871, 58 years".

From 1936 to 1938, Dionicio Rodriguez, a Mexican builder and artist, built six pieces in concrete at Cedar Hill, most using a faux bois technique to make them resemble wood. He built two footbridges, a bench, a table in a pergola, a hollow "tree trunk", and an Annie Laurie Wishing Chair, also in a pergola.

== Notable interments ==
- Walter Esau Beall - major league baseball player
- Eugene Black - U.S. congressman
- Jonathan Bourne, Jr. - U.S. senator
- Fred Lewis Crawford - U.S. congressman
- Abe Fortas - U.S. Supreme Court Justice (unmarked)
- Stephen Warfield Gambrill - U.S. Congressman
- Walter William Herrell - major league baseball player
- Edward Keating - U.S. congressman
- George Keefe - major league baseball player
- Arch McDonald - baseball and football sportscaster
- Raymond Moore - major league baseball player
- John Frost Nugent - U.S. senator
- John J. Pelley – railroad executive
- George Sutherland - U.S. Supreme Court Justice
- Charles Winfield Waterman- U.S. senator
- James Eli Watson - U.S. senator

The cemetery has a mass grave for the victims of the Terra Cotta Railroad wreck.

== See also ==
- List of burial places of justices of the Supreme Court of the United States
