= Edward J. Pearson =

American railroad executive (1863–1928)

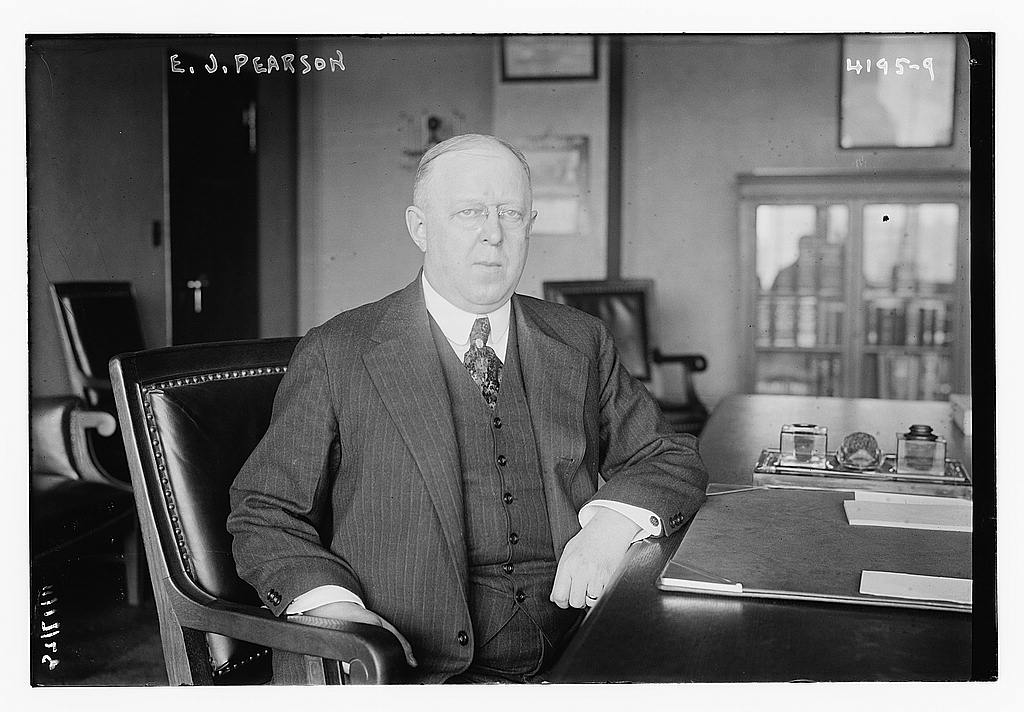
Pearson in 1917

Edward Jones Pearson (October 4, 1863 - December 7, 1928) was president of the New York, New Haven and Hartford Railroad.

== Early life and education ==
He was born on October 4, 1863, in Rockville, Indiana. He attended Cornell University, where he graduated with a degree in engineering.

== Career ==
Entered railway service: 1880 as rodman Missouri Pacific, since which he has been consecutively to 1883, in Engineering Department Missouri–Kansas–Texas Railroad and Atlantic and Pacific Railroad; 1883 to 1885, assistant engineer, Northern Pacific; 1885 to April, 1890, supervisor, Bridges, Buildings and Water Supply, Minnesota and St. Paul divisions; April, 1890, to May, 1892, division engineer, Eastern Division of same road; May, 1892, to May, 1894, principal assistant engineer at Chicago in charge of construction of Chicago Terminal Lines and of work on the Wisconsin Central Lines being operated by the Northern Pacific; May, 1894, to August, 1895, superintendent, Yellowstone Division, Glendive, Montana; August, 1895, to December, 1898, superintendent, Rocky Mountain Division, Missoula, Montana; December, 1898, to April, 1902, superintendent, Pacific Division, Tacoma, Washington; April, 1902, to September, 1903, assistant general superintendent; September, 1903, to May 1, 1904, acting chief engineer, and May 1, 1904, to December, 1905, chief engineer; December 1905, to date, chief engineer, Pacific Railway. Later president of the Milwaukee Road.

In 1916, he was president of the Texas Pacific Railroad when he was hired as a vice president of the New York, New Haven and Hartford Railroad.

== Death ==
He died on December 7, 1928, at Johns Hopkins Hospital in Baltimore, Maryland.
