= Yankee Clipper (train) =

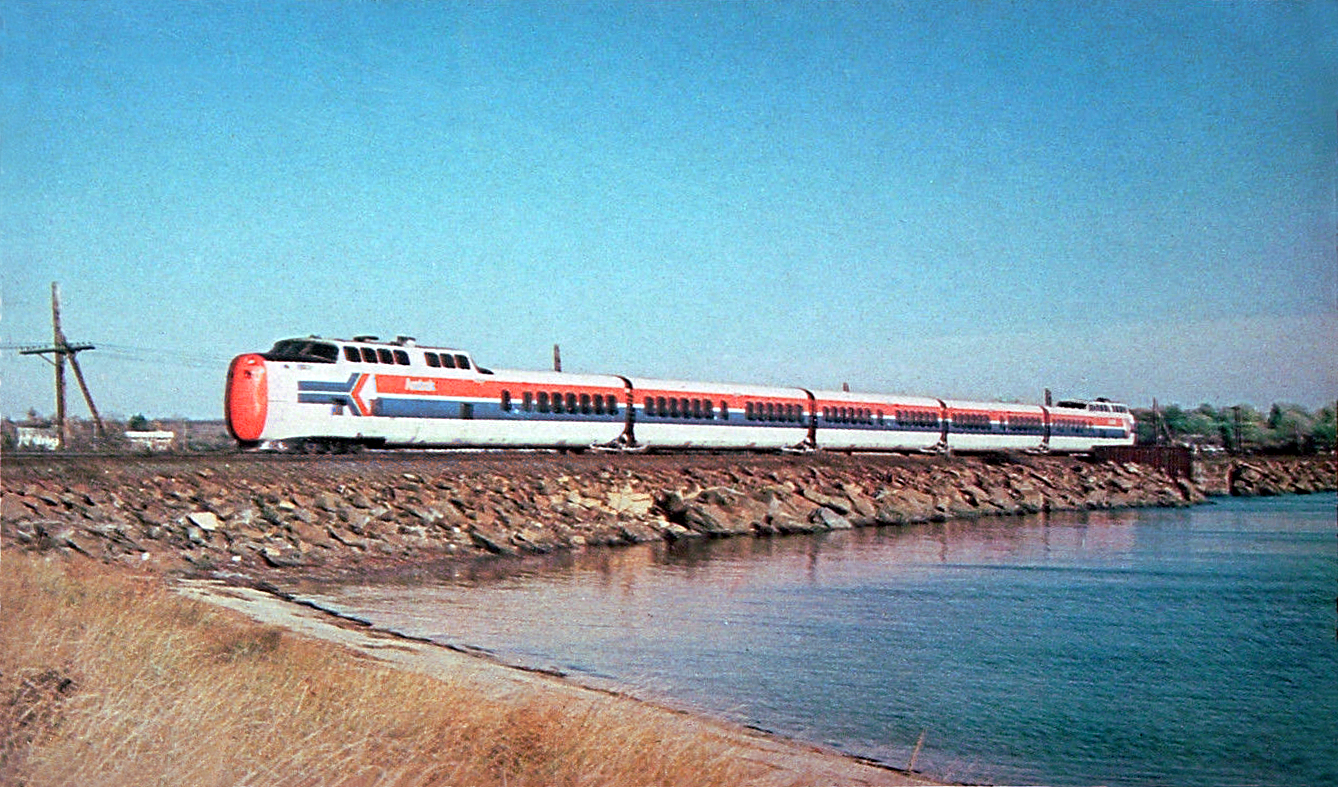
The Yankee Clipper in Stonington, Connecticut, in 1974. At that time, it was operated by Amtrak.

The Yankee Clipper was a luxury train offering service between Boston and New York City. Early, it pulled by a Class I-4 Pacific engine and later led by Class I-5 Hudsons. All of its cars, including Club car, two Parlor cars, Dining car, and Sun Parlor Observation car, were Pullmans.

Its first ever stop was at Readville station on April 14, 1934. At that stop, it dropped off Irving and Murton Millen, two brothers who robbed a Needham, Massachusetts bank and shot two police officers, Francis Oliver Haddock and Forbes McLeod. Thousands came to see the brothers get off the train.

== Works cited ==
- Parr, James L. (2009). Dedham: Historic and Heroic Tales From Shiretown. The History Press. ISBN 978-1-59629-750-0.
