= 1955 Connecticut floods =

Natural disaster in Connecticut, United States

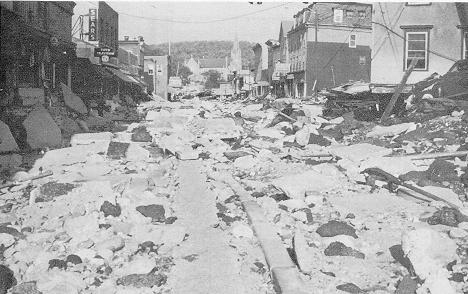
- Flood damage in Winsted, Connecticut, from Diane
- Date: Mid-August 1955
- Location: Farmington, Putnam, Waterbury, and Winsted
- Cause: Hurricane Connie and Hurricane Diane
- Deaths: 87
- Property damage: $200 million in 1955 US dollars

The Flood of 1955 was one of the worst floods in Connecticut's history. Two back-to-back hurricanes saturated the land and several river valleys in the state, causing severe flooding in August 1955. The rivers most affected were the Mad River and Still River in Winsted, the Naugatuck River, the Farmington River, and the Quinebaug River. The towns that suffered the most loss include Farmington, Putnam, Naugatuck, Waterbury, and Winsted. 87 people died during the flooding, and property damage across the state was estimated at more than $200 million, in 1955 figures. The floods prompted changes in safety measures, river monitoring, and zoning laws.

== Background ==
=== Causes ===
The flooding was caused by the rains from two hurricanes, Hurricane Connie and Hurricane Diane. On August 11, Hurricane Connie swept through the East Coast—missing Connecticut, but bringing about 4 to 6 inches of rainfall to the state on August 13. Hurricane Diane came through the following week. The path of Hurricane Diane came closer to Connecticut, after soaking up waters from the Atlantic Ocean. Once the hurricane reached the coast of Long Island, it dumped an additional 13 to 20 inches of rain on Connecticut over a two-day period. The heavy rains on already-saturated ground made several rivers in the region begin to overflow. Massachusetts, New York, and Rhode Island experienced flooding, but Connecticut was hardest hit in New England. New Jersey, Delaware, and Pennsylvania were also hit by flooding caused by the two hurricanes. Two months later, another storm brought an additional 12 to 14 inches of rain to New England—hitting some communities that had been affected by the August floods, and others that had escaped.

== Flooding ==
The rains poured down for much of the day Thursday, August 18, starting at about 3:00 AM. By 11:00 PM, the Shepaug River and brooks in the western portion of the state had begun to overflow their banks. In Waterbury, the water reached an estimated 35 feet in places, and was reported to have moved at rates up to 50 miles per hour. While major rivers, such as the Connecticut River, had flood control measures in place, smaller rivers and brooks did not. That is where the major damage occurred.

The Housatonic River in Western Connecticut reached 24.50 feet—its highest levels until October 1955, when it again reached 24.50 feet. On noon of August 20, 1955, President Eisenhower declared Connecticut a "major disaster area".

== Rescue efforts ==
Police forces, volunteer firefighters, Connecticut National Guard members, the Coast Guard, and average citizens worked together to rescue people from their homes and other buildings where they became stranded. At 1:00 AM on August 19, as the water began rising over the banks of several rivers, Gov. Abraham Ribicoff mobilized the National Guard. More than 25 helicopters—from the U.S. Navy and local companies like Sikorsky—were used to rescue hundreds of people from rooftops and tree branches where they clung to life. The flood hit the Naugatuck river with such fury that as many as 500 people in the Waterbury area had to be rescued by helicopter.

== Impact ==
=== Damage ===
A Sunday-Herald reporter, who flew over the region the day after the floods, described the area as "a staggering toll of death in a shroud of mud". The death toll was 87 people—including people who suffered heart attacks while being rescued.

The following damage figures were outlined in the state report three months after the flood:

- 668 dwellings were totally destroyed
- 2,460 suffered major damage
- 5,213 suffered minor damage
- 507 "industrial establishments' suffered $88.4 million in damage to buildings, machines, and materials
- 1,436 commercial establishments suffered $45.5 million in damage
- 922 farms reported losses of $2.5 million (not including damage to the land itself)
- public property damage was estimated at $36.8 million

In New England, more than 200 dams suffered partial or total failure. More than 50 coffins floated away from a cemetery in Seymour. The state shipped in 300 temporary housing units from Groton, to help provide shelter for the newly homeless.

=== Changes ===
The floods prompted the United States Army Corps of Engineers to build $70 million worth of dams and flood walls along several Connecticut rivers. In 1960, the Army Corps built the Thomaston Dam. The Thomaston Dam on the Naugatuck River is one of the largest flood control measures erected by the Army Corps of Engineers. Following the building of the Thomaston Dam, the Corps built the Northfield Brook Dam, in 1965; the Hop Brook dam in Naugatuck, in 1968; and the Colebrook Dam, in 1969. The Sucker Brook Dam (1966) and Mad River Dam (1961) were built to protect Highland lake and Winsted from future severe flooding

== See also ==
- 1955 Atlantic hurricane season
