= Mystic Bank =

- U.S. National Register of Historic Places
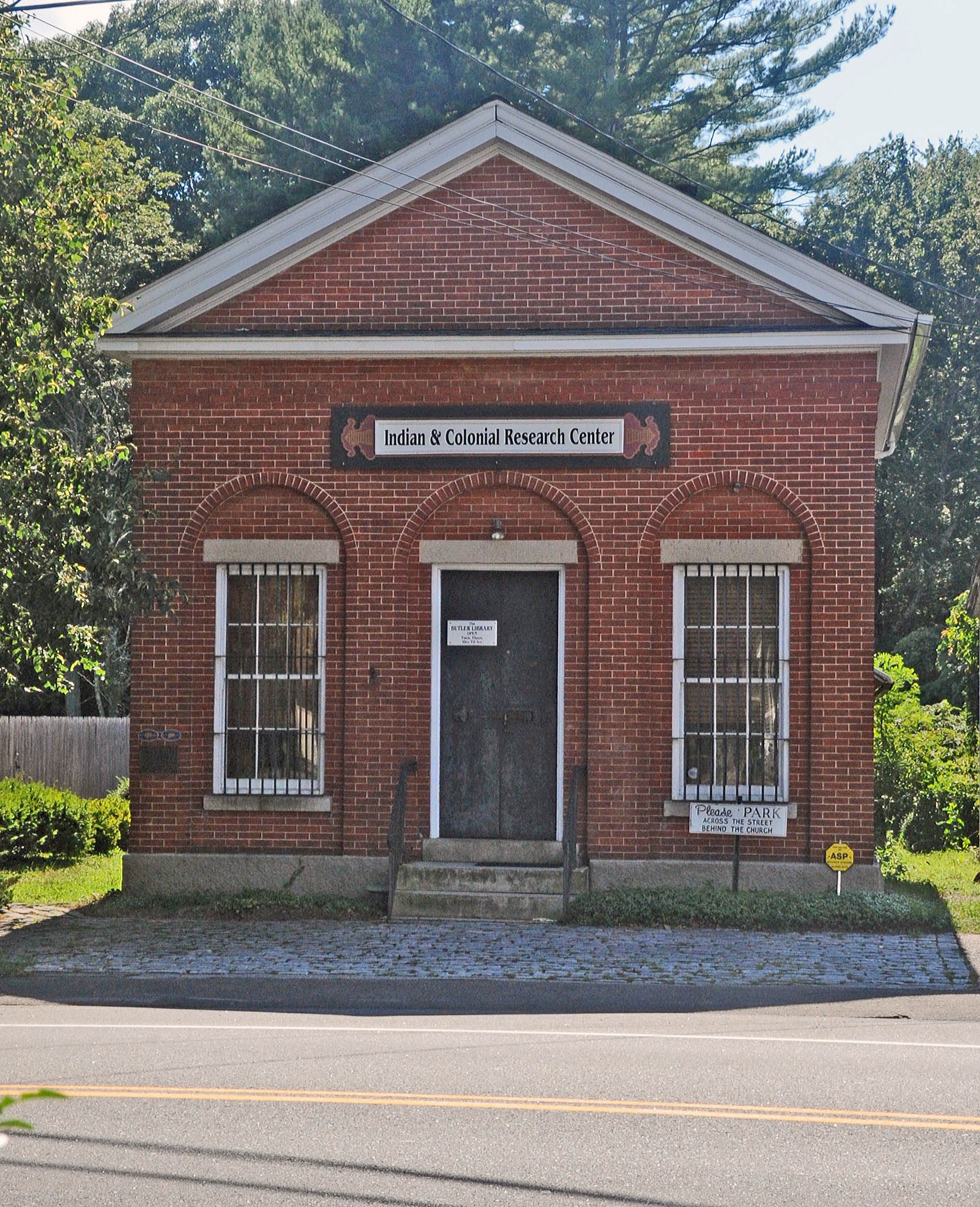

- Location within Connecticut Location within the United States
- Location: 39 Main Street, Old Mystic, Connecticut
- Coordinates: 41°23′25″N 71°57′36″W
- Area: less than one acre
- Built: 1856
- Architectural style: Greek Revival
- NRHP reference No.: 14000476
- Added to NRHP: August 8, 2014

The Mystic Bank is a historic commercial building at 39 Main Street in the Old Mystic village of Stonington, Connecticut. Built in 1856 for a bank founded in 1833, it was used by the town as a meeting hall after the bank closed in 1884, and now houses offices. It is a good example of a small 19th-century Greek Revival brick bank building. It was listed on the National Register of Historic Places in 2014.

== Description and history ==
The former Mystic Bank building is located in the center of Old Mystic Village, on the west side of Main Street south of its junction with Old Mystic Center Road. It is a modest single-story brick building, with a gabled roof and granite foundation. The main facade is three bays wide, topped by a pedimented gable. Each bay is set in a round-arch recess, with rectangular sash windows in the outer bays and the main entrance in the center bay. Each are topped by stone lintels, with brickwork filling the rounded arch above. The interior retains virtually all of its original finishes, including woodwork, plaster, and flooring; the original bank vault is also still present.

The Mystic Bank was founded in 1833 by a consortium of local businessmen as a service to the local shipbuilding community and the surrounding rural areas. The bank flourished, and was able to build this building in 1856 to accommodate its expanded business. Mystic's economic center, however, had begun to shift south to the Mystic Bridge area (now Mystic), and the bank closed in 1887. The town of Stonington acquired the building soon afterward, and used it as a district meeting hall and polling place. These uses ended about 1960. The building was again repurposed, this time to house the Indian and Colonial Research Center, a museum displaying a collection of native and colonial-era artifacts.

== See also ==
- National Register of Historic Places listings in New London County, Connecticut
