= Sabino (steamer) =

Small wooden steamboat built in 1908

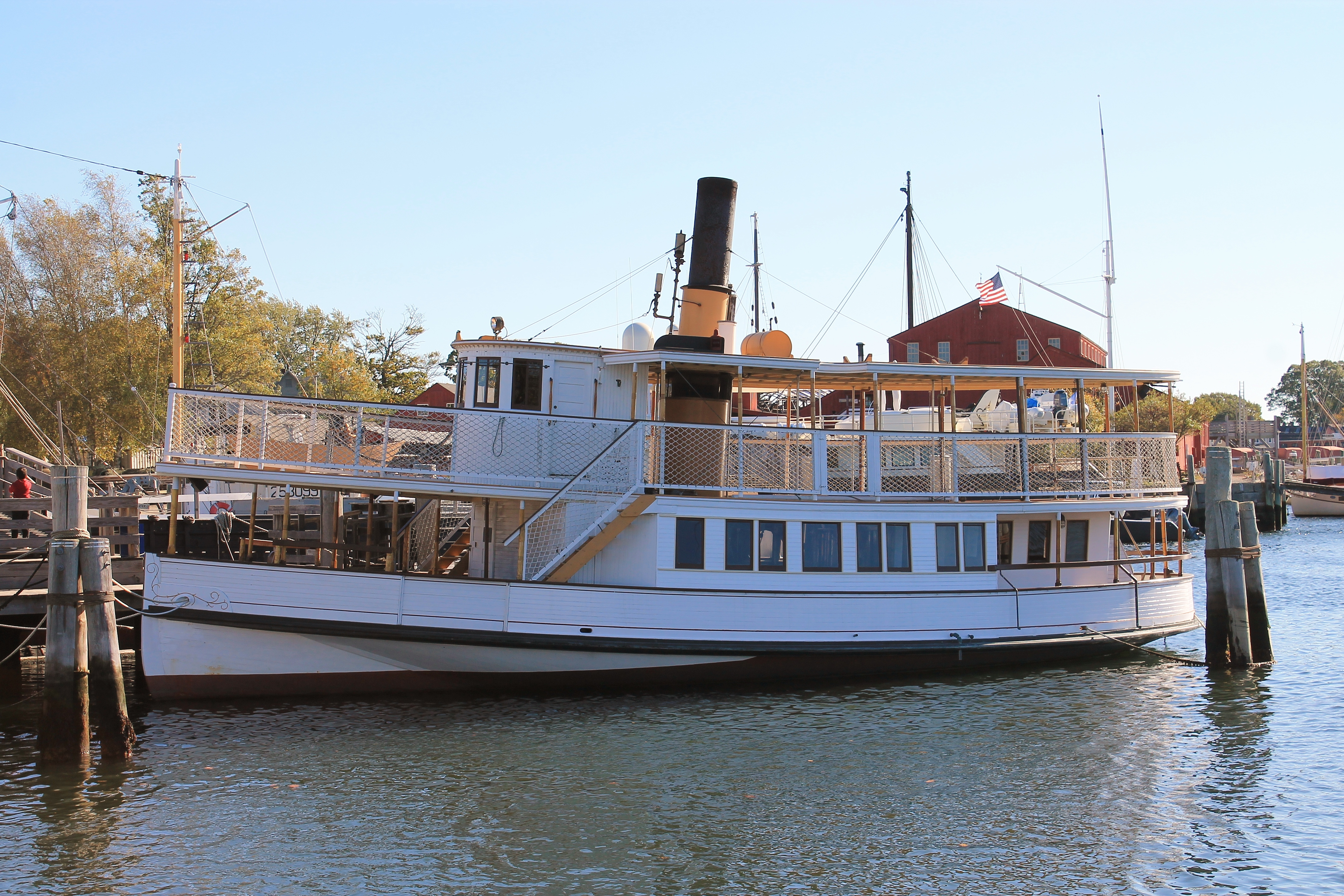

History

United States
- Namesake: Abenaki sagamore Sabenoa
- Owner: Mystic Seaport
- Builder: W. Irving Adams
- Launched: 1908
- Status: Museum ship

General characteristics
- Tonnage: 25
- Length: 57 ft (17 m)
- Beam: 21 ft 11 in (6.68 m)
- Draft: 6 ft 3 in (1.91 m)
- Installed power: Paine compound two-cylinder steam engine OR two C2.2T CAT marine generators
- Speed: 8 knots (15 km/h; 9.2 mph)
- Capacity: 72
- Crew: 3
- Sabino (steamer)
- U.S. National Register of Historic Places
- U.S. National Historic Landmark
- U.S. Historic district – Contributing property
- Location within Connecticut
- Location: Mystic, Connecticut
- Coordinates: 41°21′39″N 71°58′2″W
- Built: 1908
- Architect: H. Irving Adams
- Part of: Mystic Bridge Historic District (ID79002671)
- NRHP reference No.: 92001887

Significant dates
- Added to NRHP: 5 October 1992
- Designated NHL: 5 October 1992
- Designated CP: August 31, 1979

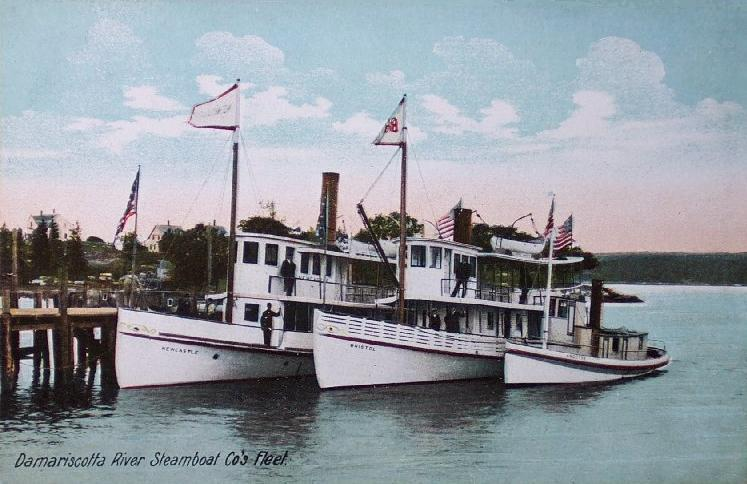
Damariscotta Steamboat Company fleet in 1906

Sabino (pronounced Sah-BYE-No) is a small wooden, coal-fired steamboat built in 1908 and located at the Mystic Seaport Museum in Mystic, Connecticut. It is one of only two surviving members of the American mosquito fleet, and it was declared a National Historic Landmark in 1992. It is America's oldest regularly operating coal-powered steamboat.

== History ==
Sabino was built in the W. Irving Adams shipyard in East Boothbay, Maine, and the 57-foot vessel was christened as Tourist on May 7, 1908. She began her career as a ferry for the Damariscotta Steamboat Company on the Damariscotta River in Maine...owned by LaForest "Foss" Etheridge.; The "Tourist" sank in 1918 due to an accident but was salvaged. On October 8, 1921, she was sold to the Popham Beach Steamboat Company on the Kennebec River, and the new owners changed the vessel's name to Sabino in honor of Abenaki sagamore Sabenoa.

On July 23, 1927, Sabino was purchased by the Cape Shore Ferry Company in Portland, Maine. She ferried passengers from Portland to the many islands of Casco Bay, and sponsons were added in 1928 to help stabilize her in the open water of the Bay. She was again sold in 1935, this time to the Casco Bay Lines. After a few years, she began to show her age and was put into the company's reserve fleet. She was returned to regular ferry service in 1956 when another ferry ran aground. However, her usefulness to the Casco Bay Lines was short-lived and she was sold to Red Slavit in 1958, who sold her to Philip and Irene Corbin of Salisbury, Massachusetts, soon after.

The Corbin family spent a great amount of time repairing the vessel and bringing her up to Coast Guard regulations for a passenger vessel. In 1971, the Sabino was sold to C. Bruce Brown, Joseph Pulvino, and Philip Corbin's son Jim, doing business as Steamship Sabino Inc. Jim was made part of the corporation because neither Pulvino nor Brown had any practical experience running a steamboat. Brown was an insurance salesman and Pulvino was an aeronautical engineer with the General Electric Company in Lynn, Massachusetts. The Sabino had run on the river a year before but had no licensed captain or engineer. In order for her to do real business, they needed a licensed captain and a licensed engineer. Capt. Dana Terell from Cape Elizabeth, Maine was hired as the captain, and Pulvino approached the Commander of the US Coast Guard in Boston and asked for an engineering license. He was told that experience was needed as a seaman in the engine room. Pulvino explained the situation and it was agreed that, if he could pass the examination to be a marine engineer, the Commander would issue a license limited to the Sabino. Pulvino passed the exam along with his mentor John Clements, and he was issued a limited license.

The Sabino began operating from Newburyport on the Merrimack River on Memorial Day, running between Newburyport and the Black Rocks in Salisbury Beach in one direction, and Newburyport and Merrimac, Massachusetts, in the other direction. On extreme high tides, she would make it all the way to Haverhill. She operated both day and nighttime jazz cruises on the Merrimack River until 1974, when she was leased for one year to the Mystic Seaport Museum to determine if a steamboat would appeal to the museum's patrons.

The ocean voyage between Newburyport and Mystic Seaport was almost the demise of the Sabino. She hit large waves on the trip which stirred up all the dormant coal from the bilge and blocked the onboard bilge pumps, causing the engine room to fill with water. Luckily, there was a large gasoline-powered pump on board that was used to keep her afloat. She limped into Groton, Connecticut, to be immediately pulled from the water. The Mystic Seaport shipyard experts recaulked her bottom, and she became a popular attraction, prompting the museum to purchase her. Under the museum's care, Sabino received a complete makeover. The seaport has operated her as a working exhibit since, giving rides to visitors (except during a full restoration from 2014 to 2017, and during 2020 due to the COVID pandemic).

In 1992, she was designated a National Historic Landmark.

== Operation ==
Sabino is operated by a captain, one or two engineers, and two deck hands. The captain does not directly control the direction or speed of the vessel. Instead, the captain relays his commands through a sequence of bells and gongs to the engineer, who controls the engine. Sabino has an average speed of 8 knots (15 km/h; 9.2 mph) and will consume 60 tons of coal annually. It is estimated that Sabino carries approximately 33,000 passengers per year. In 2023 Sabino was outfitted with a diesel electric engine. She now operates daily with the electric engine with a captain and two crew, but has the ability to still run the steam engine on occasion.

== Current status ==
Sabino currently operates regularly at the Mystic Seaport Museum giving patrons tours of the Mystic River.

== See also ==
- List of National Historic Landmarks in Connecticut
- National Register of Historic Places listings in New London County, Connecticut
- List of museum ships
