= Rossie Velvet Mill Historic District =

Historic district in Connecticut, United States

- U.S. National Register of Historic Places
- U.S. Historic district
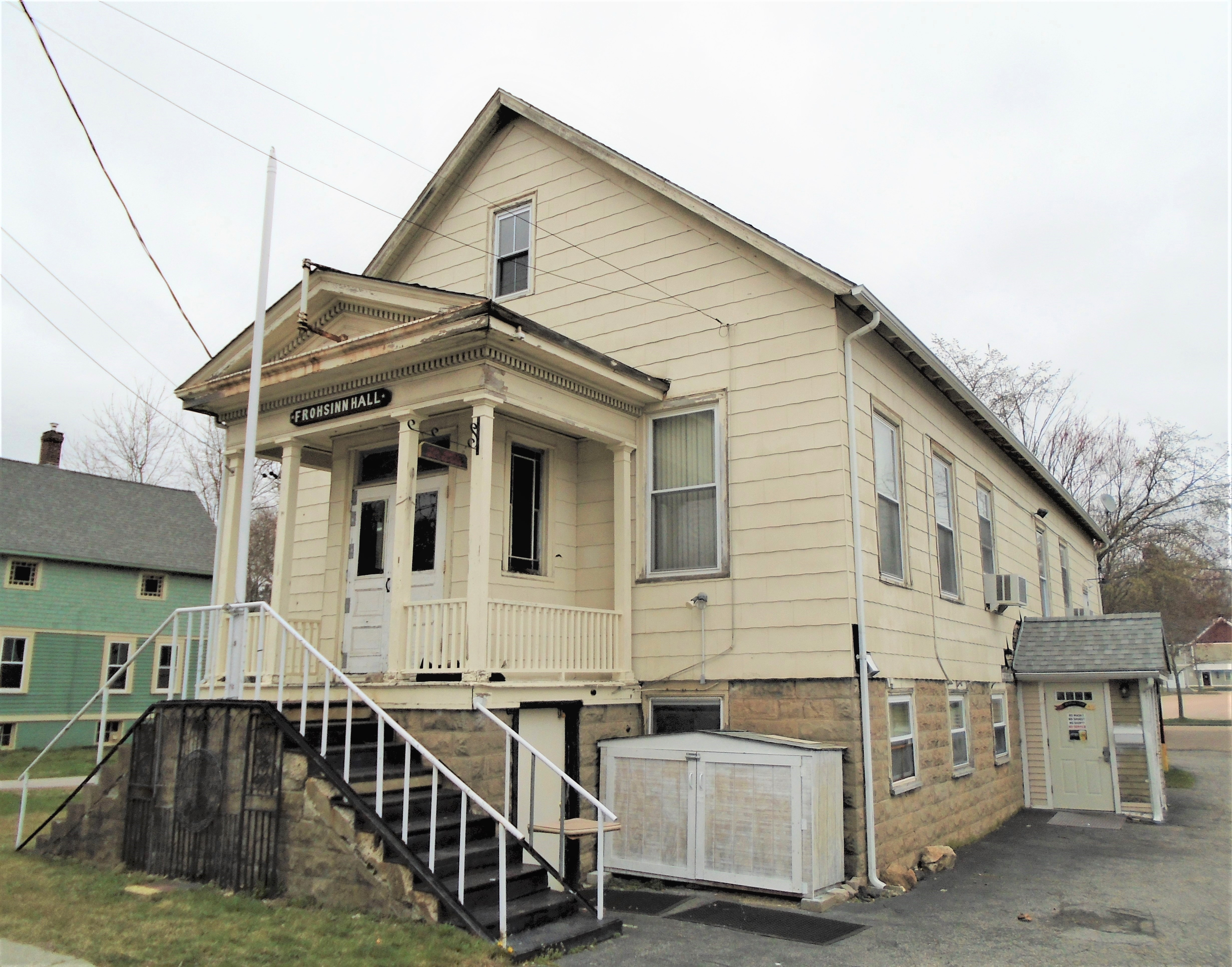
- Frohsinn Hall (1906) in the Rossie Velvet Mill Historic District

- Location within Connecticut Location within the United States
- Location: Roughly along Bruggerman Court, Bruggerman Place, Greenmanville Avenue (East Side), Hinckly Street, Pleasant Street, Rossie Street, Velvet Street in Stonington, Connecticut
- Coordinates: 41°21′13″N 71°57′46″W
- Area: 120 acres (49 ha)
- Architect: Robert D. Kohn; Giovanni Favretti et al.
- Architectural style: Colonial Revival; Bungalow/Craftsman etc.
- NRHP reference No.: 07000110
- Added to NRHP: March 9, 2007

The Rossie Velvet Mill Historic District is located in the village of Mystic in Stonington, Connecticut. Its main focus is the former Rossie Velvet Mill, a large brick industrial facility on the east side of Greenmanville Avenue that is now a research center for the nearby Mystic Seaport Museum. The district extends along Greenmanville Avenue between Pleasant Street in the north and the museum complex in the south. Most of the buildings in the district are residential housing built to house workers at the mill, and were built between about 1850 and 1950. The district includes 51 properties in 120 acres (49 ha). The district was listed on the National Register of Historic Places on March 9, 2007.

The area that houses the Rossie Velvet Mill was primarily agricultural until the mid 19th Century, with its farmers providing goods to the shipbuilders and other businesses in Mystic. A small textile mill began operation on the bank of the Mystic River in 1850, on what are now the grounds of the museum, precipitating development as a modestly scaled industrial area. In 1897, the Rossie Velvet Mill was established spurred on by two factors: first, a local business development group recruited velvet makers from Germany to the area, repeating a success in Stonington village, and second, the McKinley Tariff of 1890, which encouraged the owners of a velvet mill in Süchteln (northwestern Germany) to relocate to the United States and open a manufacturing facility to avoid the tariff. This business was a major local success, employing 200 workers (including a significant number of experienced German immigrant weavers) at what was the village's largest employer. The Rossie operation failed during the Great Depression, but the plant was soon operating again under different ownership. Finally, the mill permanently closed in 1958.

Rossie Velvet Mill

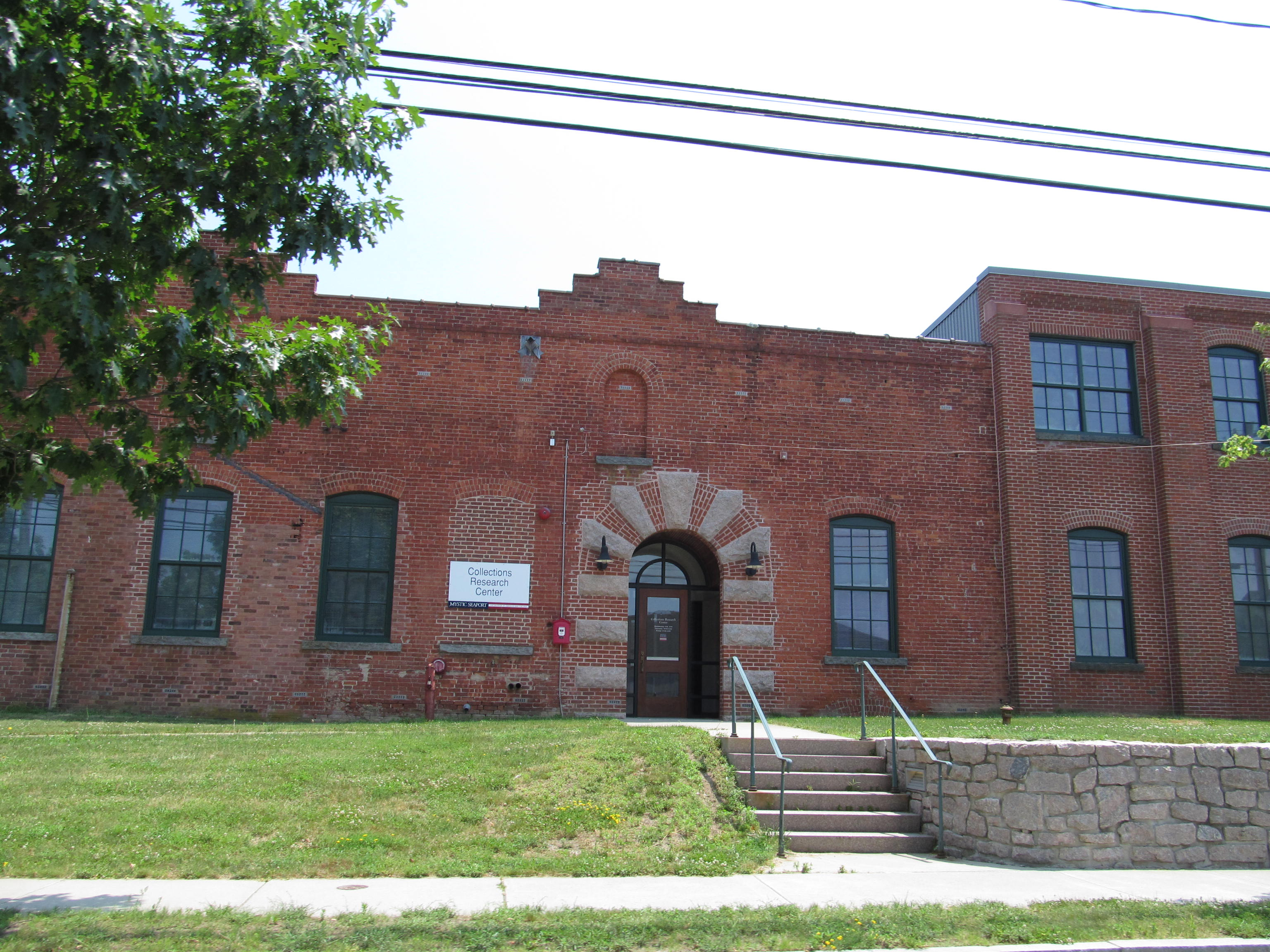
Main entrance (2012)

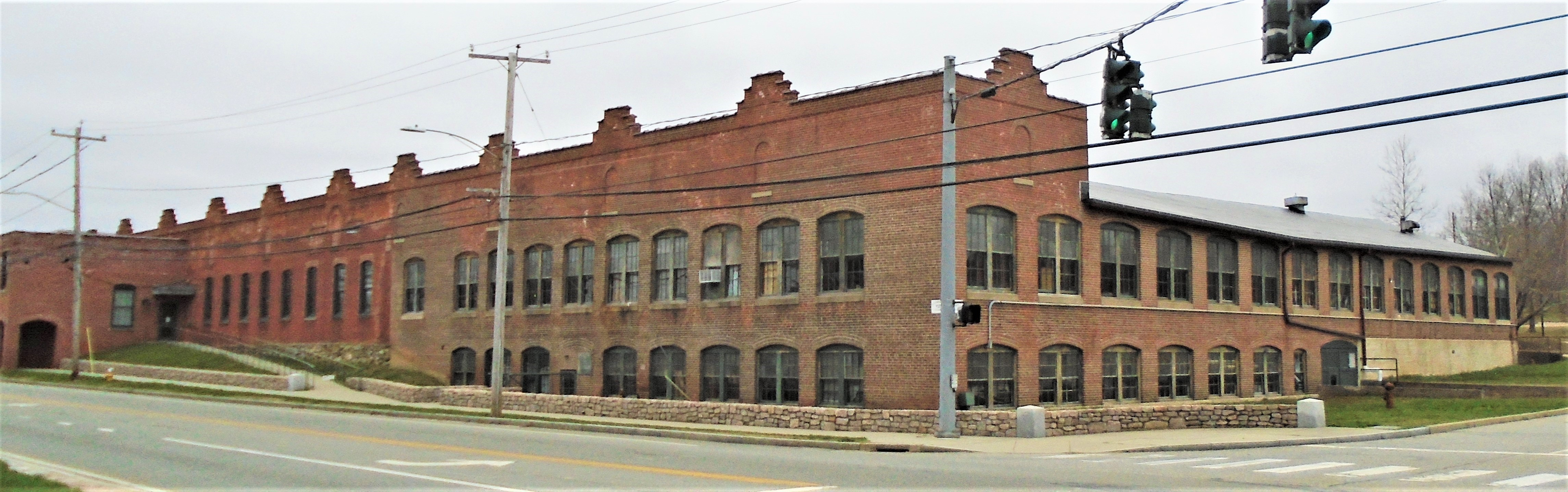
(2021)

== See also ==
- National Register of Historic Places listings in New London County, Connecticut
