= Emma C. Berry (sloop) =

American fishing sloop

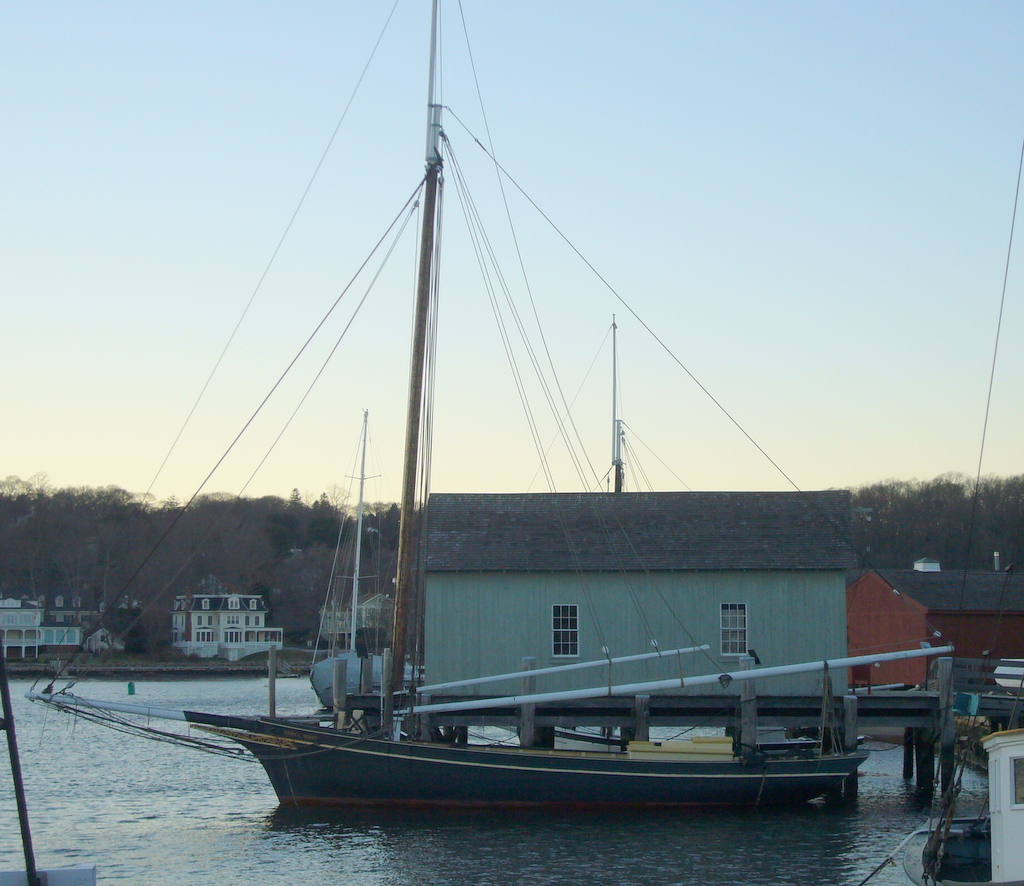

History

United States
- Builder: Palmer Shipyards
- Launched: 1866
- Status: Museum ship

General characteristics
- Tonnage: 15 GRT
- Length: 39.2 ft (11.9 m) (registered); 39.2 ft (11.9 m) LOA
- Beam: 14.6 ft (4.5 m)
- Depth of hold: 5.7 ft (1.7 m)
- Sail plan: Noank smack
- Emma C. Berry (Sloop)
- U.S. National Register of Historic Places
- U.S. National Historic Landmark
- U.S. Historic district – Contributing property
- Location within Connecticut
- Location: Greenmanville Avenue, Mystic, Connecticut
- Coordinates: 41°21′35.22″N 71°57′59.56″W
- Built: 1866
- Architect: James A. Latham
- Part of: Mystic Bridge Historic District (ID79002671)
- NRHP reference No.: 94001649

Significant dates
- Added to NRHP: October 12, 1994
- Designated NHL: October 12, 1994
- Designated CP: August 31, 1979

Emma C. Berry is a fishing sloop located at the Mystic Seaport Museum in Mystic, Connecticut, and one of the oldest surviving commercial vessels in America. She is the last known American well smack. This type of boat is also termed a sloop smack or Noank smack. The Noank design was imitated in other regions of the United States.

Emma C. Berry was built in 1866 at the Palmer Shipyards in Noank, Connecticut, by James A. Latham. The boat was named for Captain John Henry Berry's daughter. She was rigged as a schooner in 1886, and a gasoline engine was added in 1916. She was restored in 1931 to her original condition. She was declared a National Historic Landmark in 1994.

== Construction ==
The Emma C. Berry was built in 1865 by John Latham in the R. & J. Palmer Shipyard in Noank, Connecticut, for Captain John Henry Berry. It was named after Captain Berry's daughter and constructed in the style of Noank smacks. The ship was launched in 1866 with a sloop rig and two head-sails.

== History ==
Ownership of Emma C. Berry changed in the years following her construction, but Robert Westcote was the sole owner and master by 1872. Henry Chapel became the managing owner in 1886 and the sole owner in 1887, and then she was re-rigged as a schooner. It changed ownership several times from 1895 to 1910, when it became owned by the Marston Lobster Pound Co., Sargent Land and Co., and Charles A. Baker. Her career as a fishing vessel ended around 1924 and she was left on the flats of Beals, Maine. In 1926, she was purchased by Milton Beal and used as a coastal freighter.

F. Slade Dale purchased the ship in 1931, restored it, and registered it in Philadelphia. He retained ownership until it was donated to the Mystic Seaport in 1969. Captain Dayton O. Newton was the bandmaster at Admiral Farragut Academy in Pine Beach, New Jersey, and the captain of the Schooner Adventure (Camden, Maine). He met Dale in the early 1960s and offered to assemble a volunteer crew of Admiral Farragut Academy cadets to work on the Berry. Newton convinced Dale that she should sail back to the yard in Noank 100 years after her launch. In 1965, Captain Newton and volunteers sailed the ship on a shakedown cruise up the Hudson River to Troy, New York, carrying a cargo of historical documents to the Albany Historical Society.

In 1992, the Emma C. Berry sailed from the Mystic Seaport down to Fishers Island Sound under sloop rig for the first time in 106 years.

== Alterations ==
The Emma C. Berry has undergone numerous rigging alterations, design modifications, and repairs throughout its career before undergoing an extensive restoration to return it to its original configuration. The original sloop was re-rigged as a schooner in 1887, and Will Beal installed a Knox gasoline engine around 1916. Woodward and Hopkins changed the ship to a freighter, and Milton Beal removed the well. In 1963, a $5000 restoration of the ship made her seaworthy.

== Restoration ==
The Emma C. Berry underwent the first phase of its restoration at Mystic Seaport, lasting from 1969 to 1971. The restoration restored the original sloop rig and wet well, and renewed the stanchions, rotting frames, and floor timbers. After additional research and a collection of photographs were acquired, the Mystic Seaport began a second restoration to restore the deck, horn timbers, spar ironwork and sails. The Seaport drew upon literature and other sources to accurately restore her to her original configuration and appearance. They painted the hull black in imitation of the Rattler, an 1855 Noank smack built by R. & J. Palmer; hulls had been painted bottle green before that time.

Not all experts accepted the Seaport's choice to restore the ship to its original sloop condition. Jack Wilbur, a Noank boat builder and master mariner, believes that the return to the sloop rigging was a poor choice because it ignored the fact that the ship sailed as a schooner from its early years. Wilbur states that the schooner rig served the Emma C. Berry longer than the lives of those who made the decision.

== Importance ==
The National Historic Landmark nomination form states that "the sloop smack Emma C. Berry is the last known surviving American smack." The ship also had a lengthy service life.

== See also ==
- List of National Historic Landmarks in Connecticut
- National Register of Historic Places listings in New London County, Connecticut
- List of museum ships
