= Mystic River Railroad Bridge =

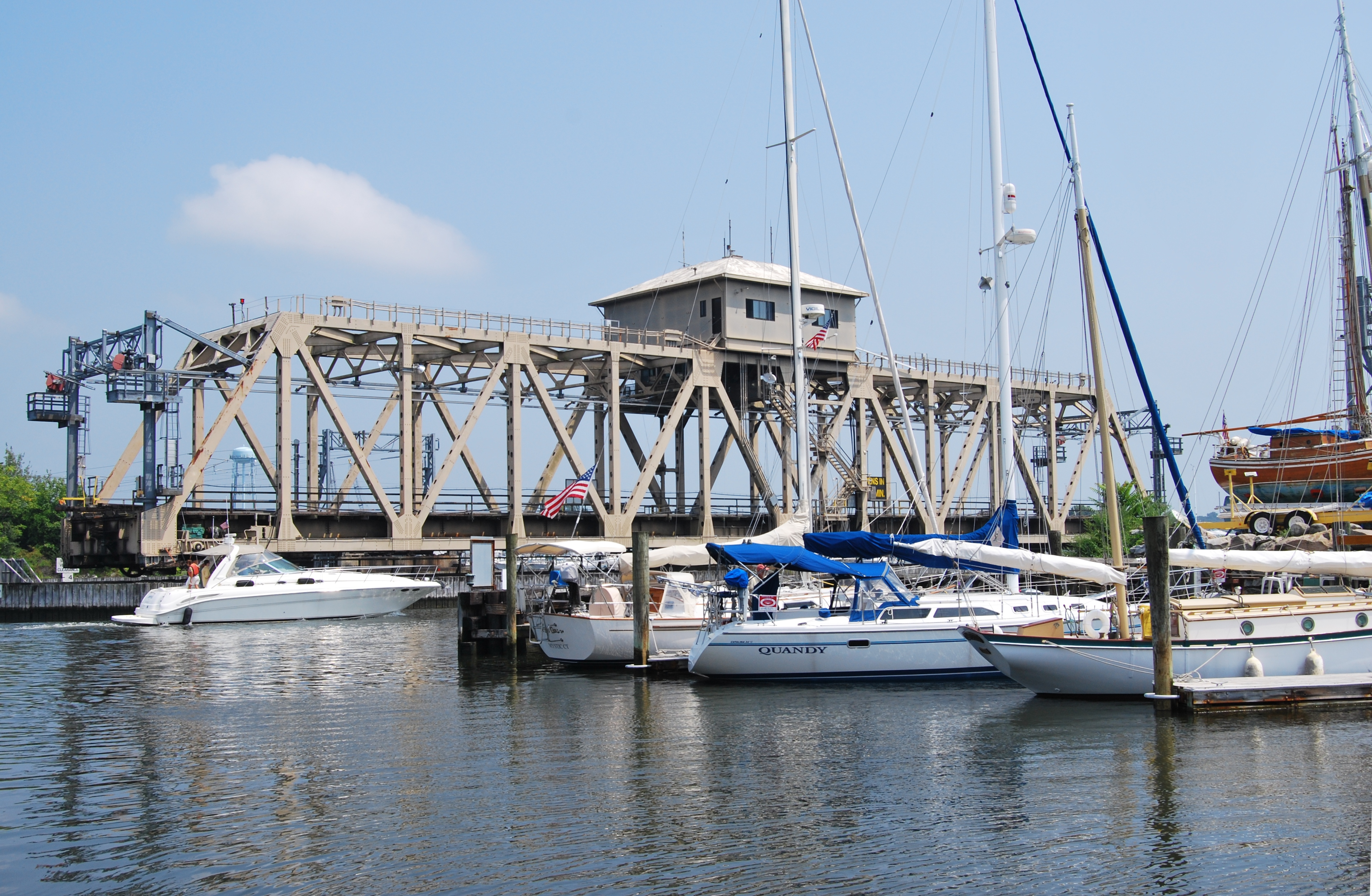
- Mystic River Railroad Bridge in August 2010
- Coordinates: 41°20′56″N 71°58′13″W
- Carries: Northeast Corridor
- Crosses: Mystic River
- Locale: Groton and Stonington, Connecticut
- Official name: Mystic River Bridge
- Maintained by: Amtrak

Characteristics
- Design: Swing bridge
- Material: Steel

History
- Opened: 1819 (first bridge); 1875 (second bridge); 1984 (third bridge)

The Mystic River Railroad Bridge is a railroad bridge carrying Amtrak's Northeast Corridor over the Mystic River in Mystic, Connecticut, between the towns of Groton and Stonington.

There have been three bridges at this location. The first bridge was a single-tracked, wooden drawbridge in 1819, which was replaced with a steel swing bridge in 1875.

The current bridge was built in 1984, and is a truss-style swing bridge, providing 13 feet (4.0 m) of vertical clearance when closed.

The two tracks running over the bridge are owned by Amtrak, are part of its Northeast Corridor route, and are used to operate its Northeast Regional and Acela Express services. There is a proposal, however, to extend Shore Line East Commuter Rail Service from its current terminus in New London to Mystic, which would require crossing this bridge.

The bridge is the easternmost drawbridge on the Amtrak-owned Northeast Corridor in Connecticut.

== See also ==
- List of bridges documented by the Historic American Engineering Record in Connecticut
- Mystic River (Connecticut)
