= The Shipwright's Daughter =

Restaurant in Mystic, Connecticut, U.S.

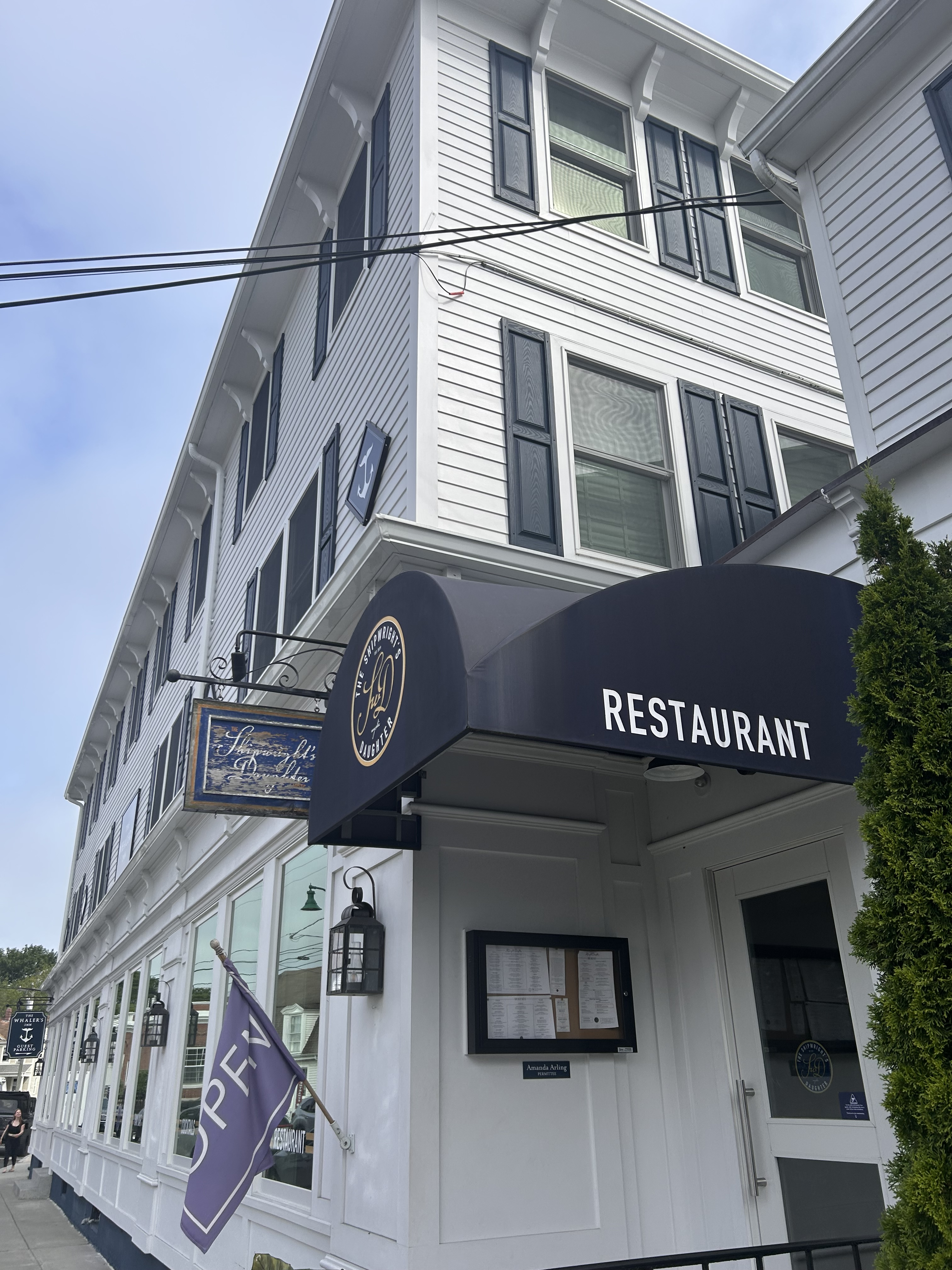
- Interactive map of The Shipwright's Daughter

Restaurant information
- Head chef: David Standridge
- Location: 20 East Main Street, Mystic, New London, Connecticut, 06355, United States
- Coordinates: 41.3544°N 71.9675°W
- Website: https://www.shipwrightsdaughter.com/

The Shipwright's Daughter is a restaurant in Mystic, Connecticut. It was included in The New York Times's 2024 list of the 50 best restaurants in the United States. Head chef David Standridge won a James Beard Award in 2024, being the first chef from Connecticut to win this award in 18 years.
