= George Henry Strohsahl Jr. =

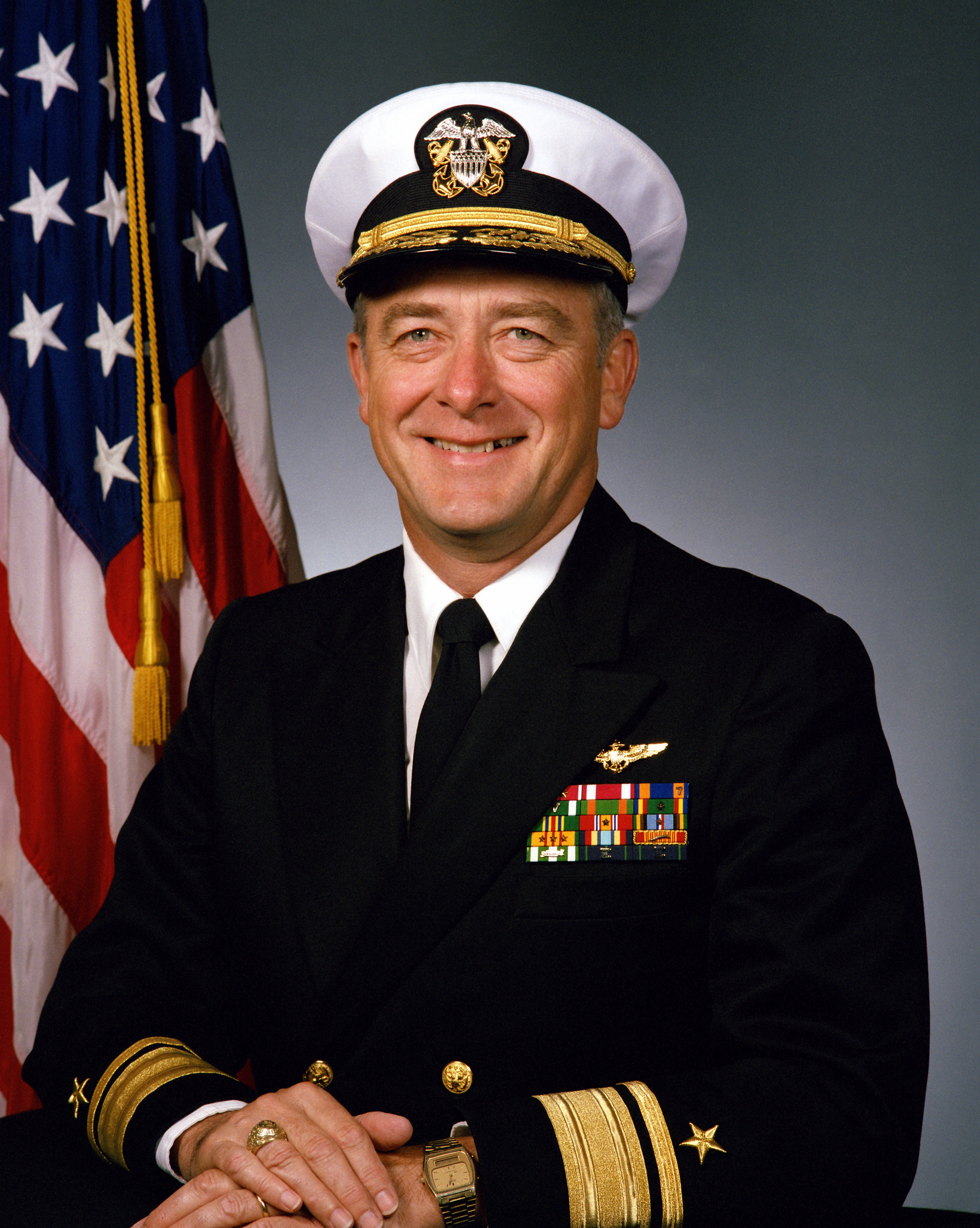
- Strohsahl in 1991
- Born: May 24, 1937; New Jersey, US
- Died: May 22, 2011 (aged 73)
- Buried: United States Naval Academy Cemetery
- Allegiance: United States
- Branch: Navy
- Service years: 35 Years
- Awards: Legion of Merit, Distinguished Service Medal

Rear Admiral George Henry Strohsahl Jr. (May 24, 1937 – May 22, 2011) was a highly decorated Navy strike fighter and test pilot who flew missions in Vietnam. Born in New Jersey and raised in Mystic, Connecticut, he rose to become commander of the Pacific Missile Test Center. Strohsahl spent 35 years in the U.S. Navy and was a 1959 honors graduate of the U.S. Naval Academy. He later earned a master's degree in Air-Space Physics from the Naval Postgraduate School and was designated a Material Professional. Strohsahl was the first naval aviator of his specialty selected for flag rank. He was awarded the Legion of Merit three times and also received the Distinguished Service Medal.

He portrayed the USS Nimitz's Air Boss, a position he actually held, in the 1980 film The Final Countdown starring Kirk Douglas and Martin Sheen.

After retiring from active duty, he was an executive manager for Boeing.
