= Mystic Museum of Art =

Coordinates: 41°21′11″N 71°58′16″W

Mystic Museum of Art is a museum of American art at 9 Water Street in Mystic, Connecticut.

The Mystic Art Association, an organization of artists who painted in the seacoast town, was founded by Charles Harold Davis in 1913. It opened the Mystic Arts Center in 1931 as an exhibition space and museum.

Mystic Arts Center was renamed Mystic Museum of Art in 2016. Its permanent collection features works by Davis, Robert Brackman, Yngve Edward Soderberg, J. Alden Weir, Charles Herbert Woodbury, and many others.

Official website
