= Mystic River Bascule Bridge =

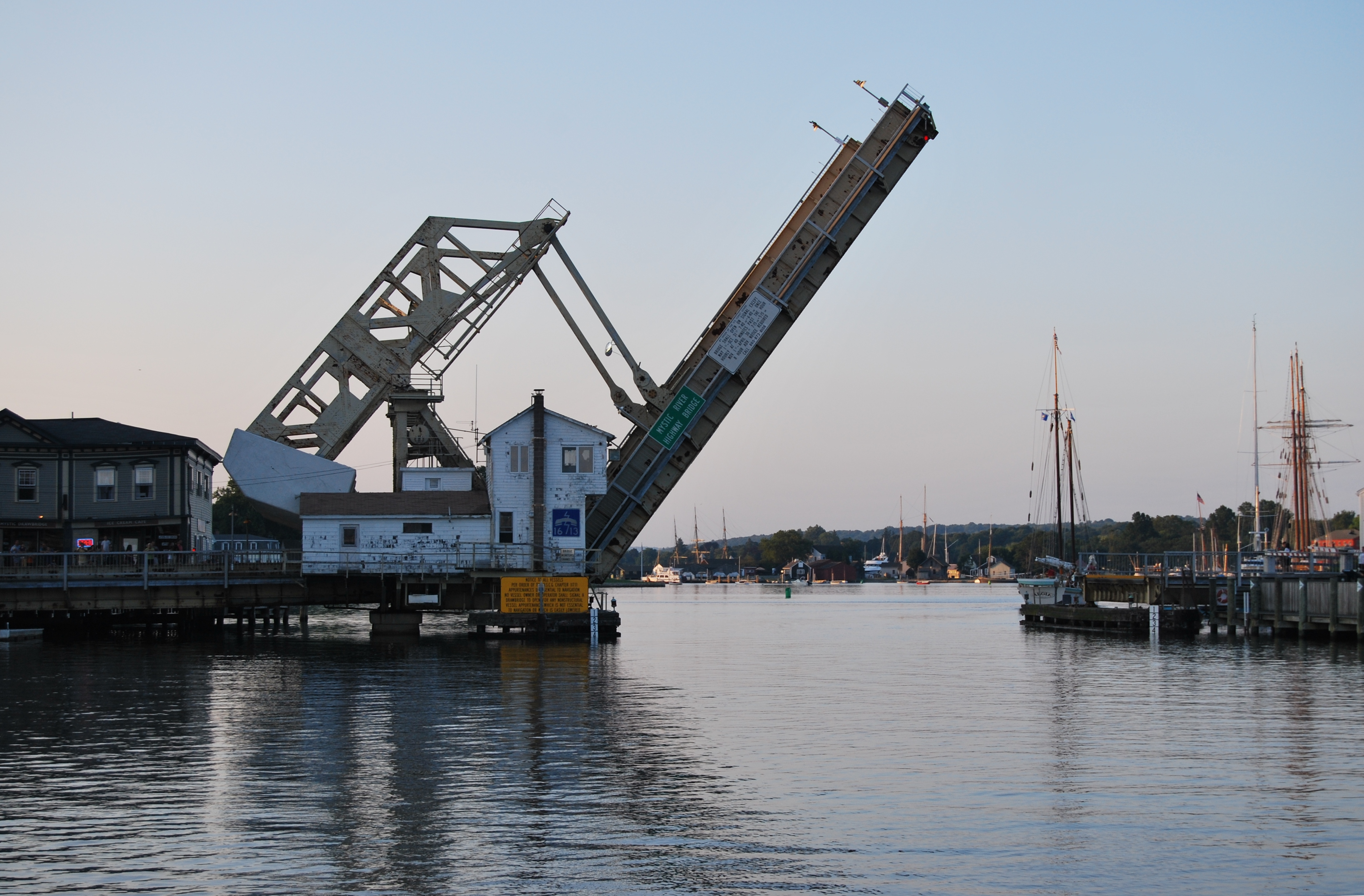
- The bridge while closing
- Coordinates: 41°21′17″N 71°58′7″W
- Carries: US 1
- Crosses: Mystic River
- Locale: Mystic, Connecticut
- Official name: Mystic River Bascule Bridge
- Owner: ConnDOT

Characteristics
- Design: Bascule
- Total length: 218 ft (66 m)
- Width: 85 ft (26 m)

History
- Designer: Thomas Ellis Brown
- Constructed by: J. E. FitzGerald Construction Company
- Opened: 1922

Statistics
- Daily traffic: 11,800

Location
- Interactive map of Mystic River Bascule Bridge

The Mystic River Bascule Bridge is a bascule bridge spanning the Mystic River in Mystic, Connecticut in the United States. It carries vehicle and foot traffic directly into the tourist district of town via 33 ft-wide (10 m) Main Street (U.S. Route 1).

== History ==
The counterweighted four bar linkage type bascule bridge was designed by former Otis Elevator Company Chief Engineer Thomas Ellis Brown of New York and built in 1922 by the J. E. FitzGerald Construction Company of New London, Connecticut, according to its historical marker. Its movable span is 85 ft (26 m) wide, 218 ft (66 m) long, weighs 660 short tons (589 long tons; 599 t), and employs two 230 short tons (205 long tons; 209 t) concrete-filled counterweights. Until 1928, the bridge carried streetcars of the Groton and Stonington Street Railway.

It is operated by the Connecticut Department of Transportation and opens for approximately five minutes around 2,200 times per year, carrying an average daily traffic of 11,800. It is driven by two 1,400 pounds (640 kg) 40 horsepower (30 kW) direct current motors, and its span is greased and inspected every one hundred openings or two weeks during the winter. From May 1 to October 31, the bridge opens hourly during daylight at 40 minutes past the hour and on demand. It usually raises to let sailboats and yachts pass underneath.

== Pictures ==
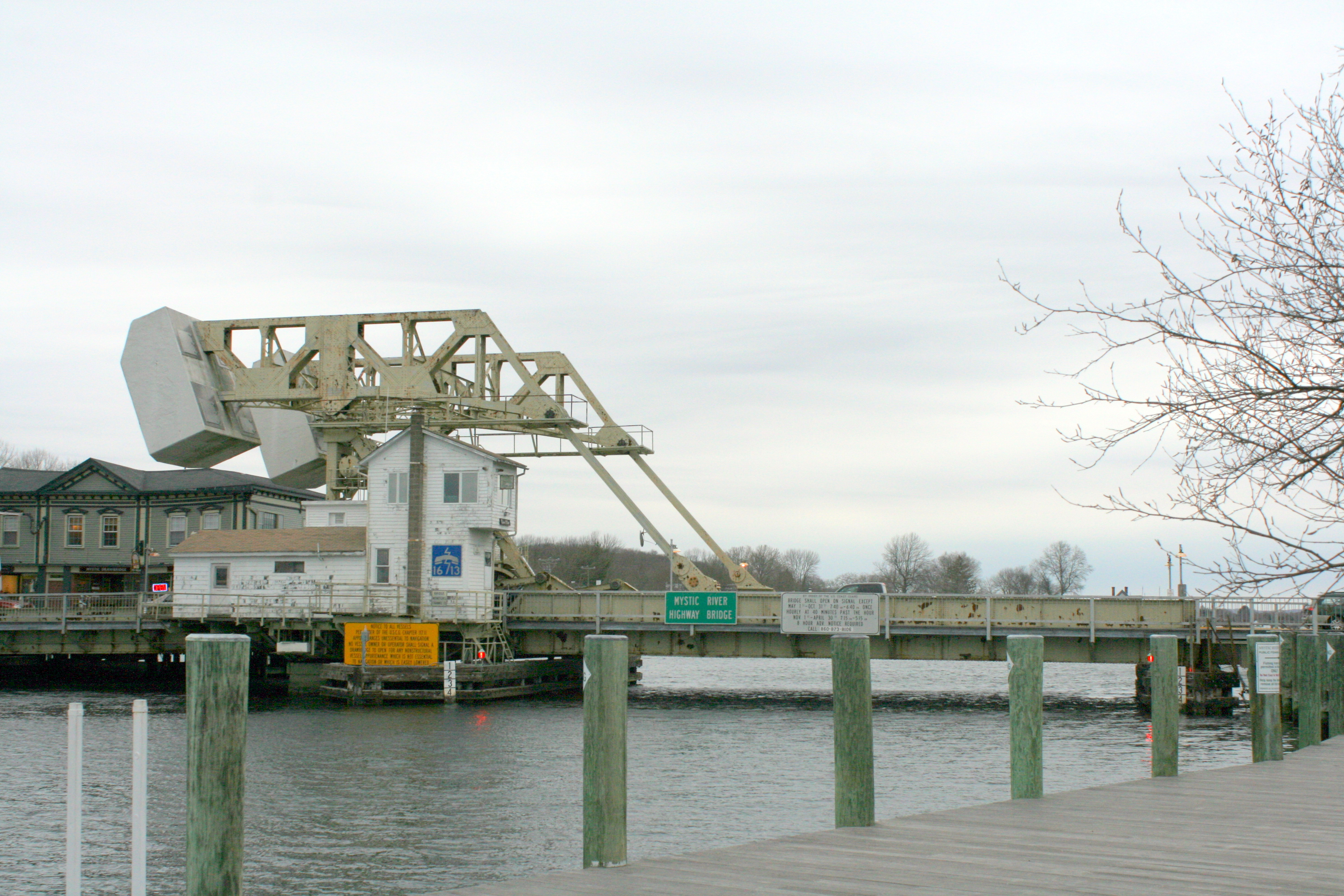
The Mystic River Bascule Bridge

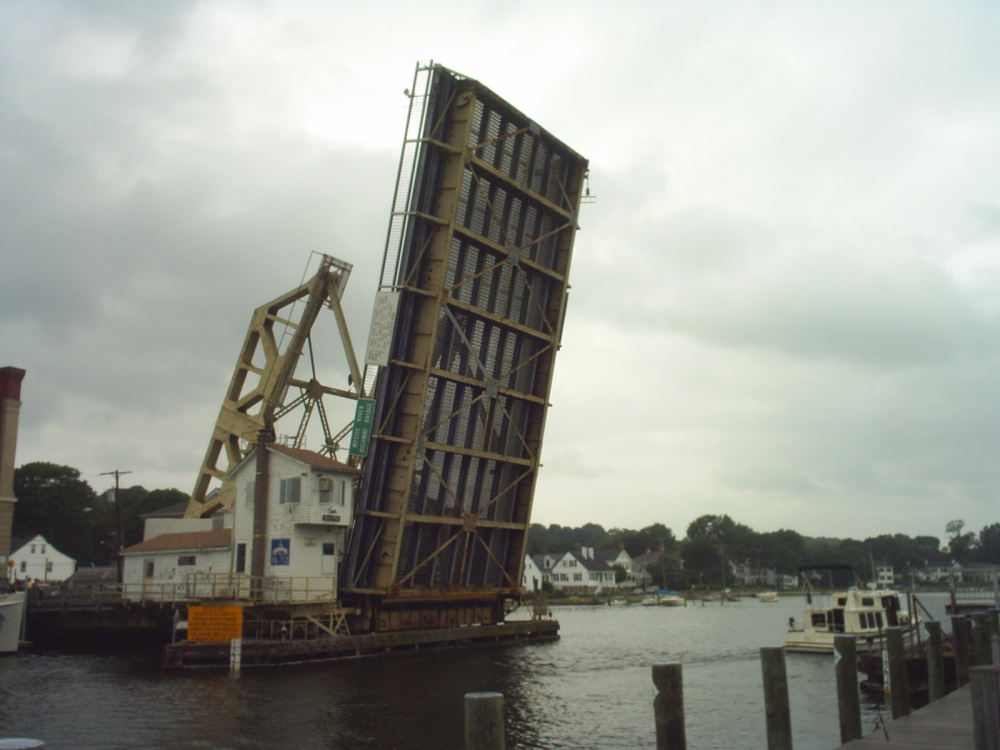
Mystic River Bascule Bridge in full-up position

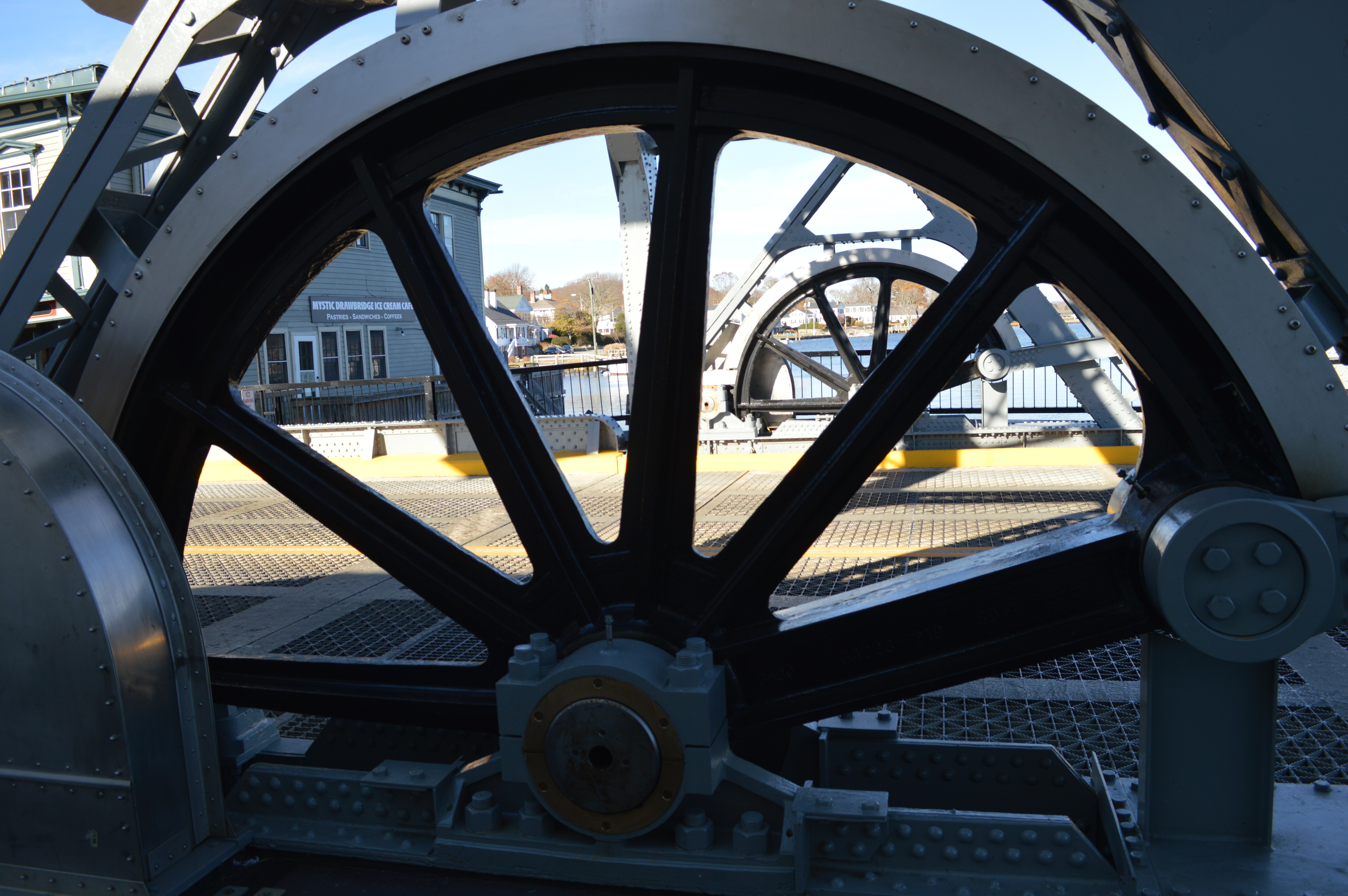
Located at the center part of the bridge.

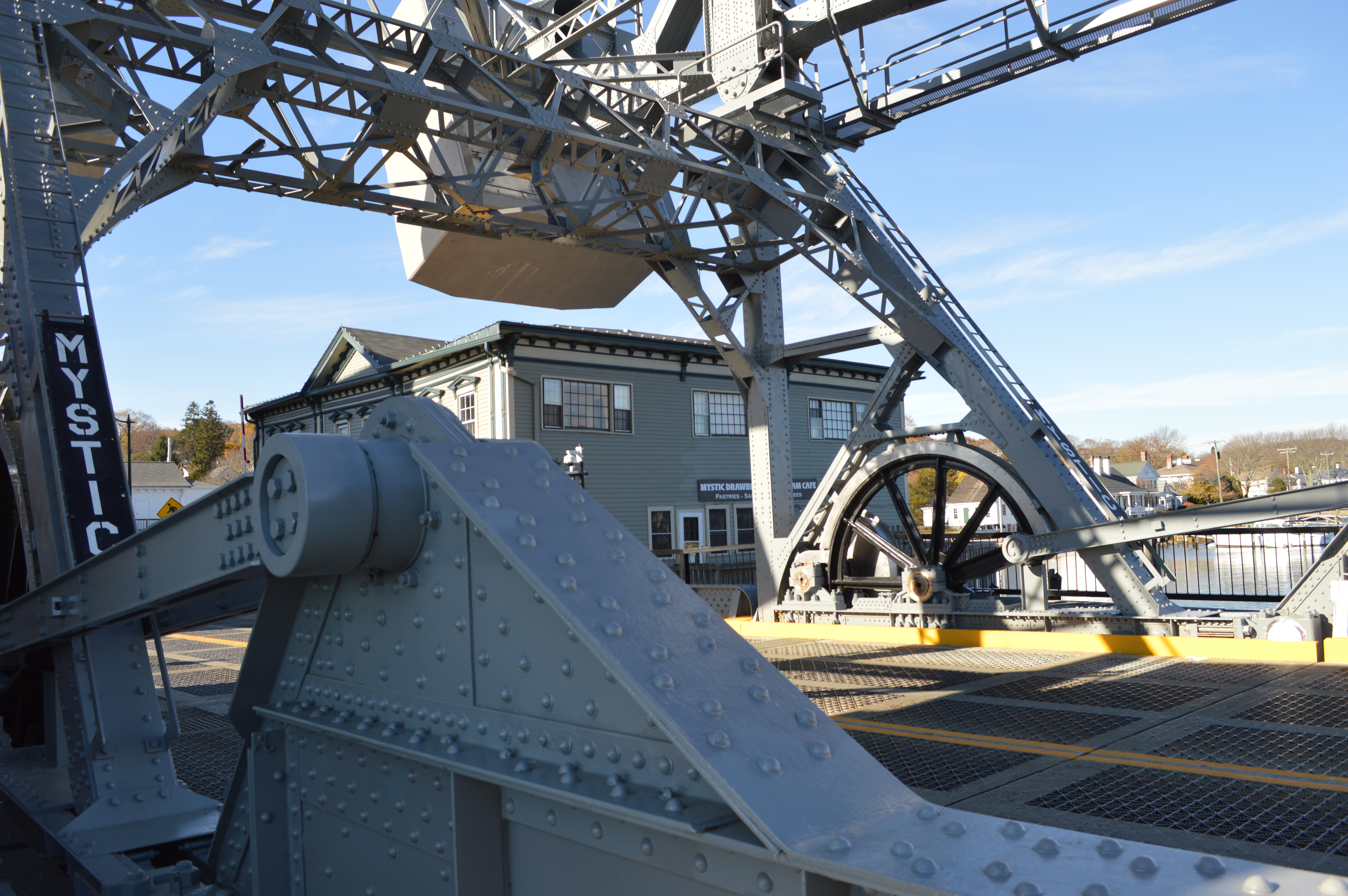
Looking at the bridge from the east side of the street.

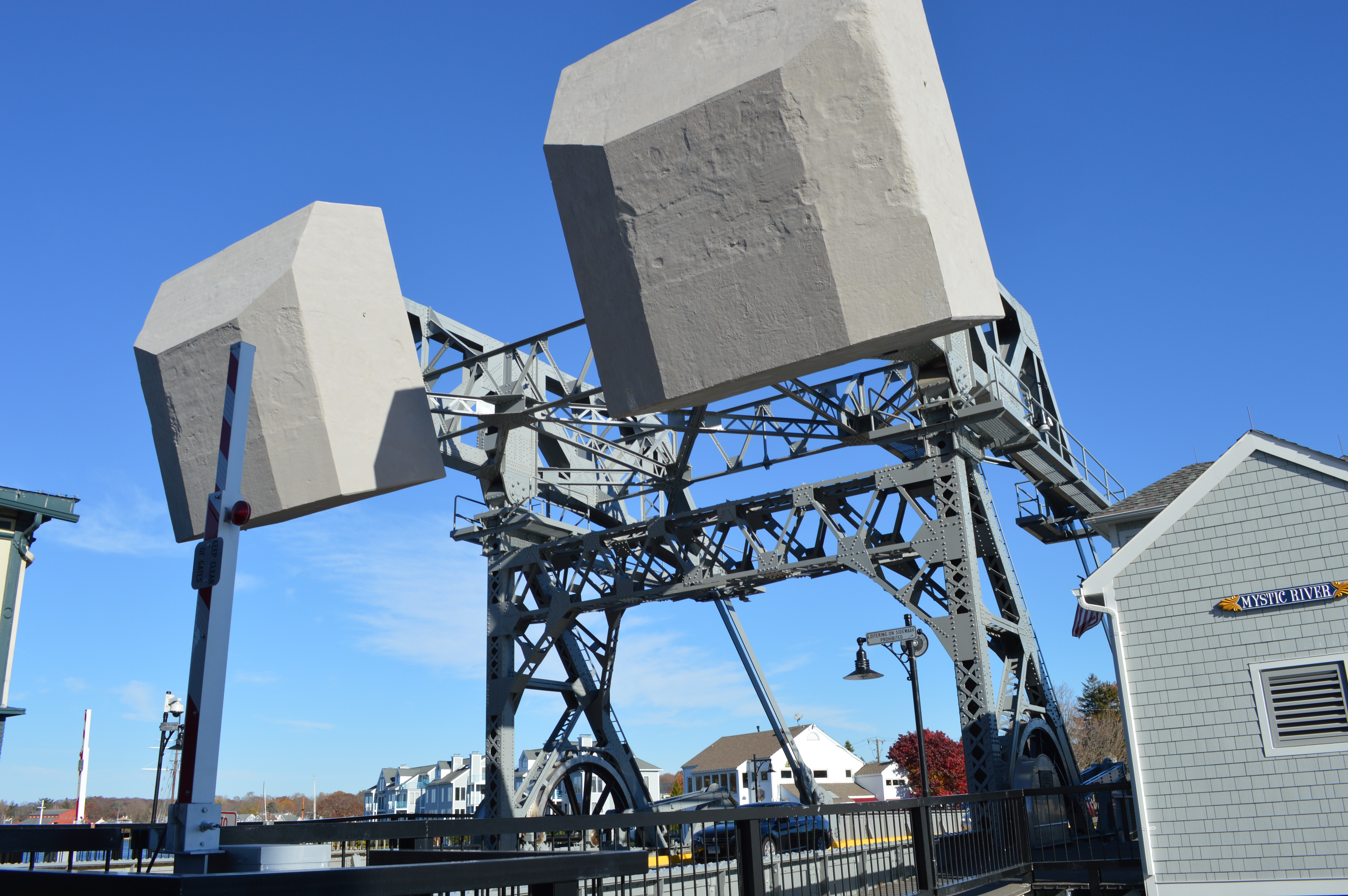
Good view of the counter weights.

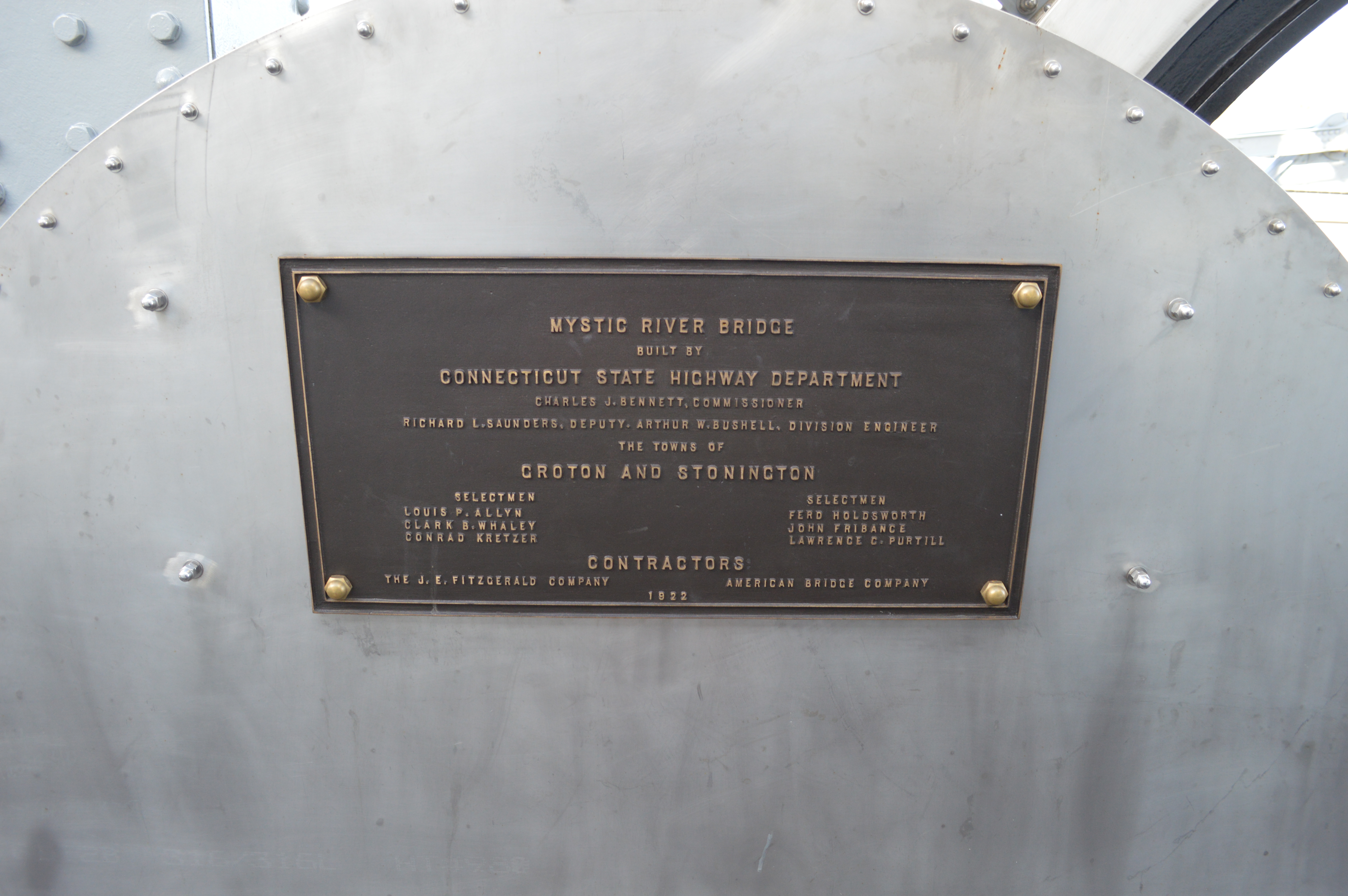
The plaque that describes when and by whom the bridge was built.

== See also ==
- List of bascule bridges
- List of bridges documented by the Historic American Engineering Record in Connecticut
- List of movable bridges in Connecticut
- Mystic Pizza
