= Mystic Bridge Historic District =

Historic district in Connecticut, United States

- U.S. National Register of Historic Places
- U.S. Historic district
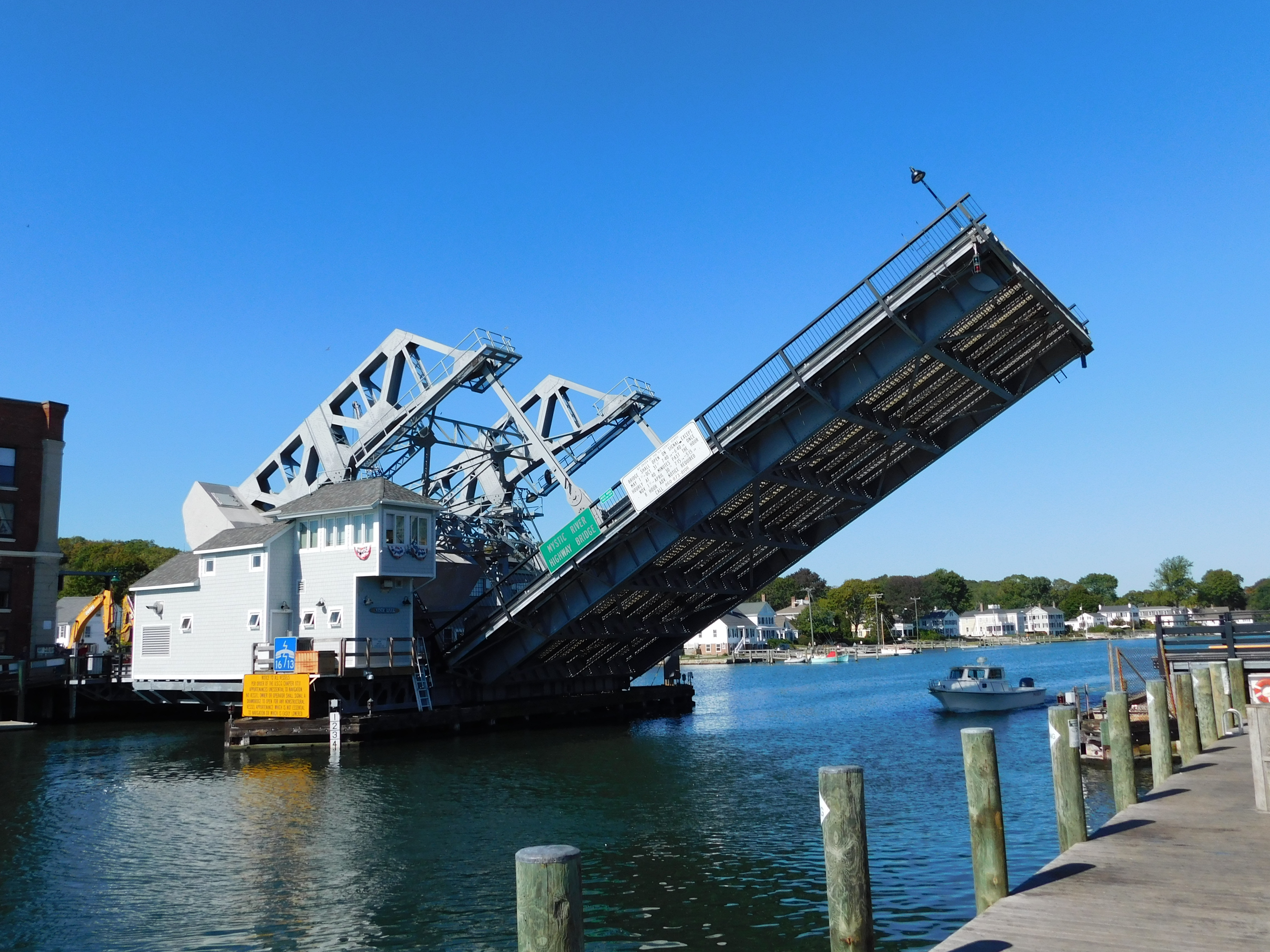
- The Mystic River Bridge (2016)

- Location within Connecticut Location within the United States
- Location: Route 1 and CT 27, Mystic, Connecticut
- Coordinates: 41°21′25″N 71°57′51″W
- Area: 155 acres (63 ha)
- Built: 1840
- Architect: Amos Clift, III; Multiple
- Architectural style: Greek Revival, Italianate, Queen Anne
- NRHP reference No.: 79002671
- Added to NRHP: August 31, 1979

The Mystic Bridge Historic District is a historic district in the village of Mystic, Connecticut on the Stonington side of the Mystic River. It includes the Mystic Seaport Museum, whose grounds and floating vessels represent the area's history, and the 1924 Mystic River Bascule Bridge. The district is significant as a well-preserved shipbuilding and maritime village of the 19th and early 20th centuries, and it was added to the National Register of Historic Places in 1979.

== History ==
Mystic developed in the early 19th century as a small seaport and shipbuilding center, businesses that were mostly located on the eastern shore of the Mystic River. The village is divided between the towns of Stonington and Groton, Connecticut.

Brothers George, Clark, and Thomas Greenman founded the George Greenman & Co. shipyard and built their Greek Revival style houses on the grounds. Their shipyard was one of the village's largest, and now serves as the grounds of the Mystic Seaport Museum. The museum still uses some of the buildings for their original purposes. This section of Mystic became known as "Greenmanville", as the brothers owned and operated the shipyard, a textile mill, and a company store. They also managed nearby farms and rented out housing to their workers. The Greenmans were Seventh Day Baptists, celebrating the Sabbath on Saturday, and the shipyard's schedule reflected that. The industrial village prospered from the 1840s to the 1890s, after which it declined, as wooden ships gave way to those built of iron and steel.

== Gallery ==
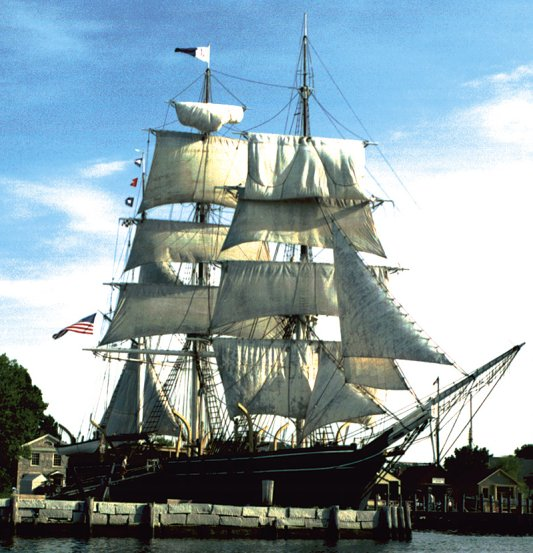
The Charles W. Morgan at the Mystic Seaport Museum

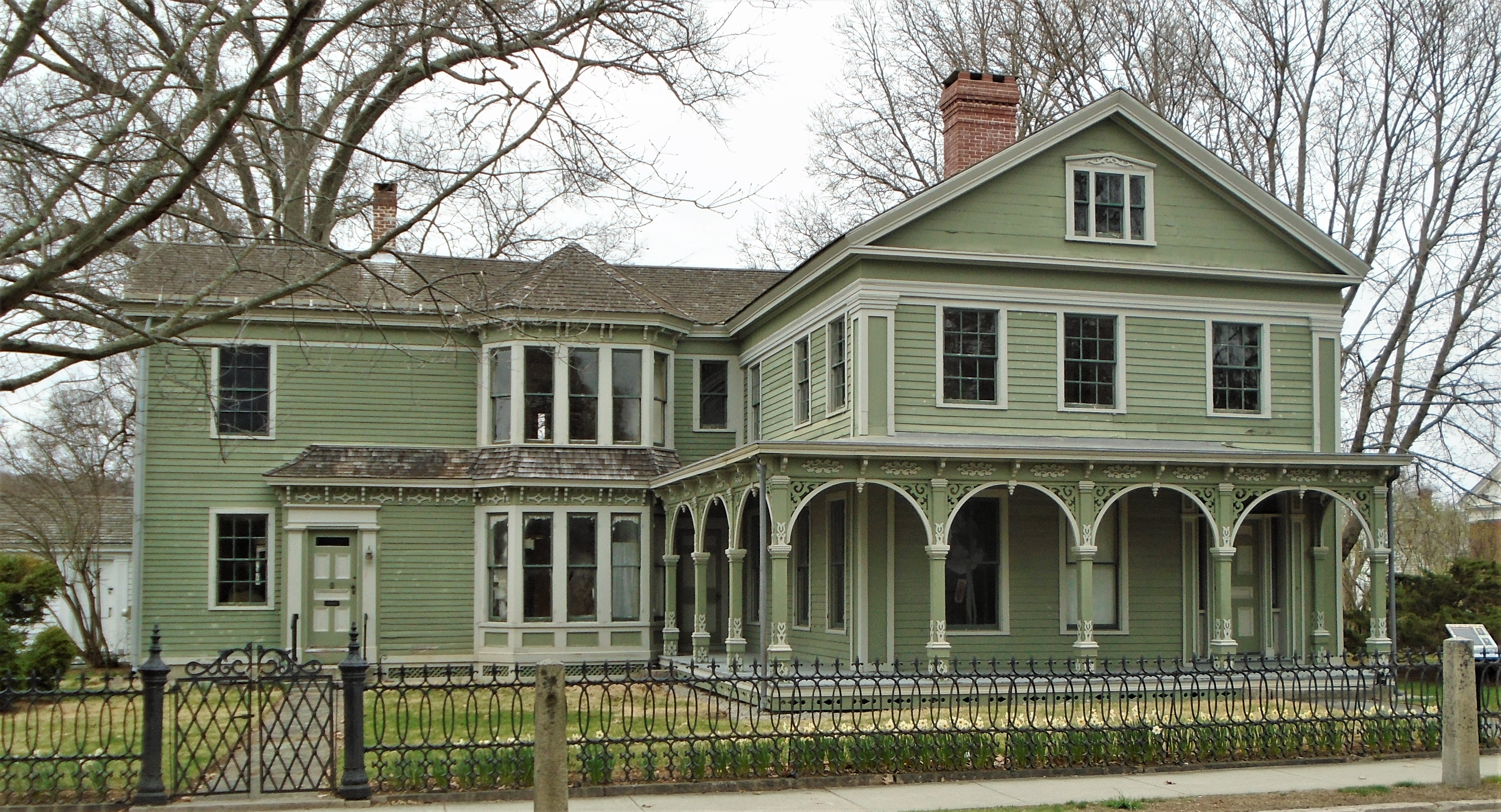
The George Greenman House

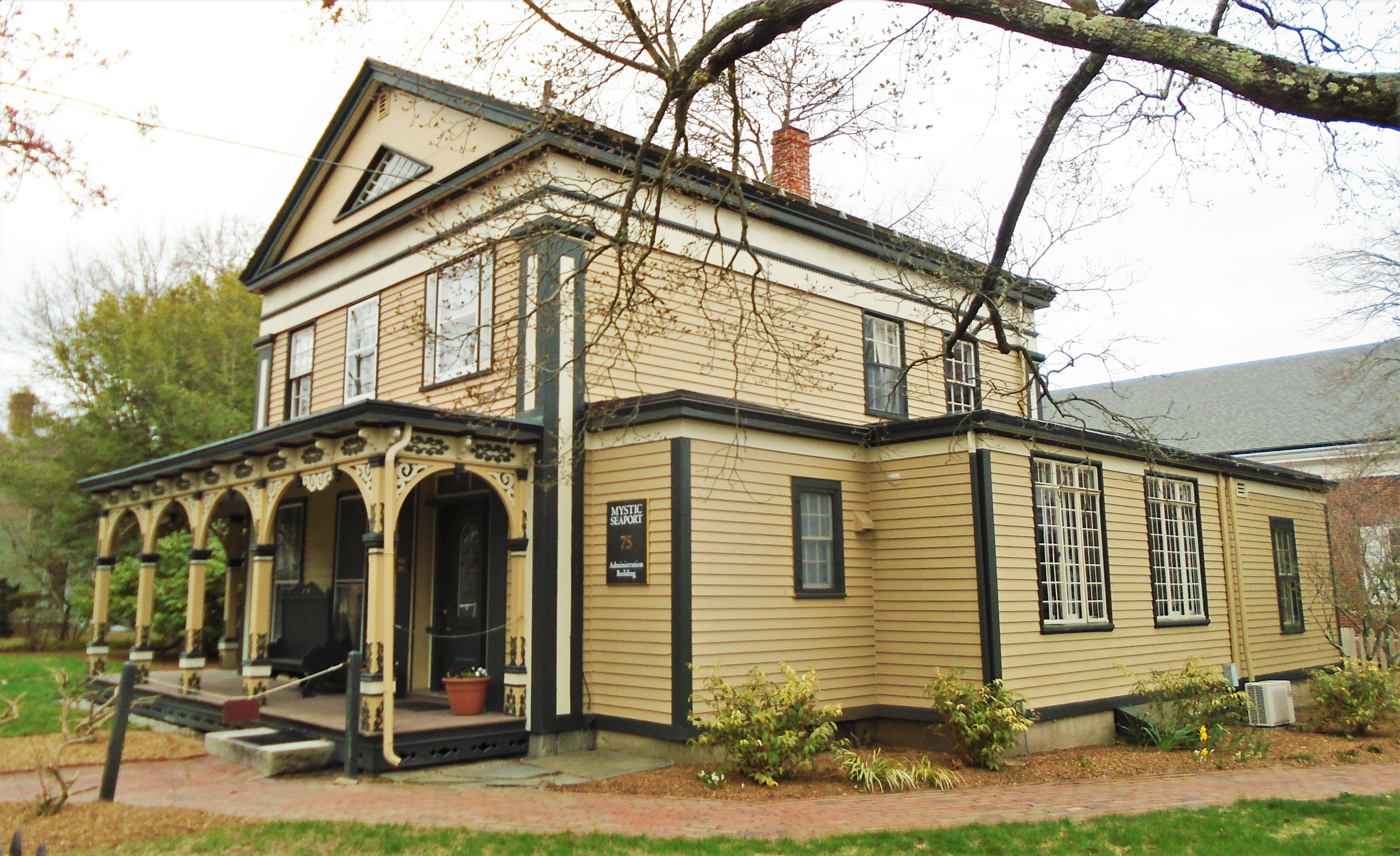
The Clark Greenman House

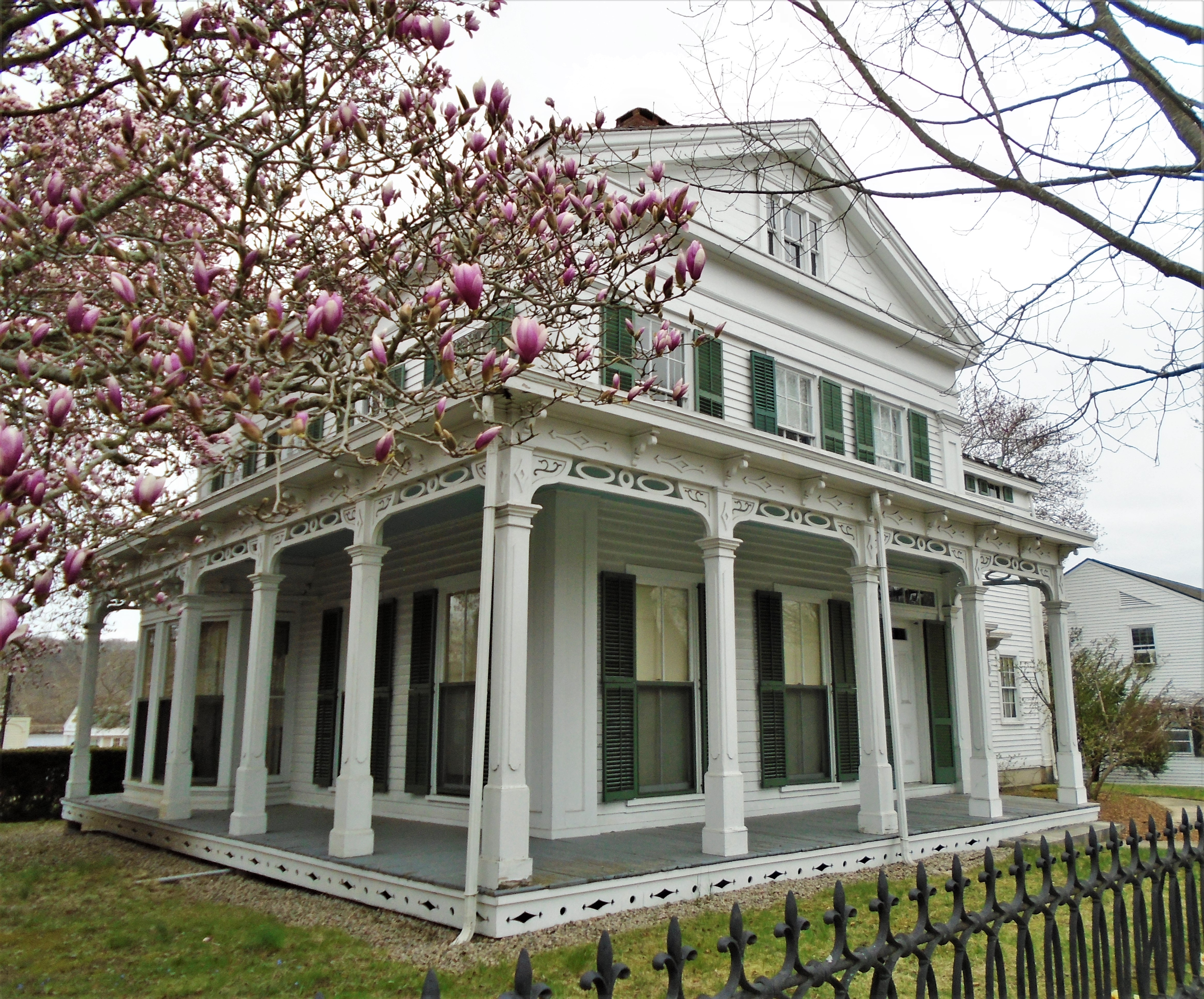
The Thomas S. Greenman House

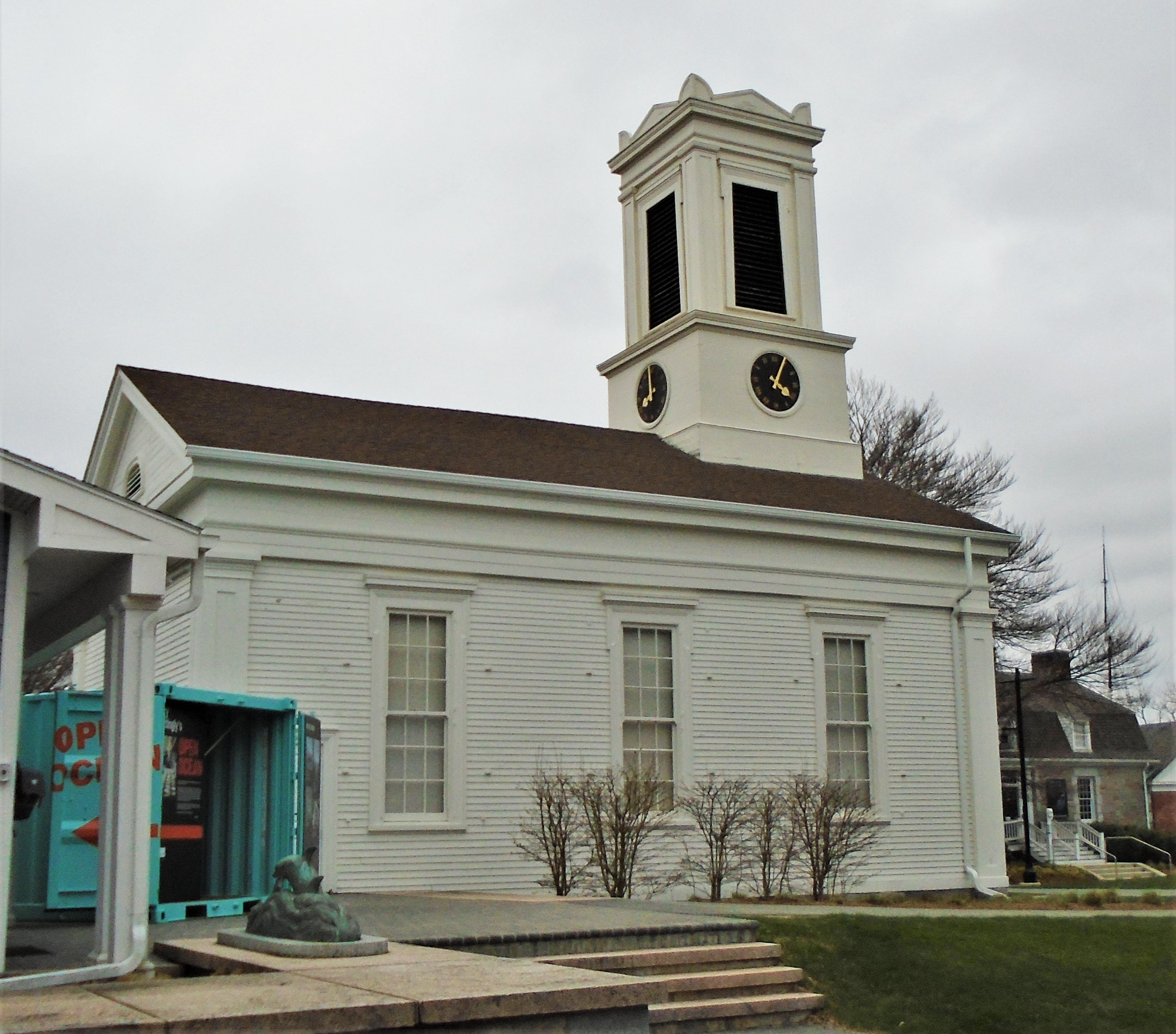
The former Greenmanville Seventh Day Baptist Church

== See also ==
- Mystic Seaport Museum, part of the district
- National Register of Historic Places listings in New London County, Connecticut
- List of bridges on the National Register of Historic Places in Connecticut
