= Mystic River (Connecticut) =

Coordinates: 41°20′59″N 71°58′13″W

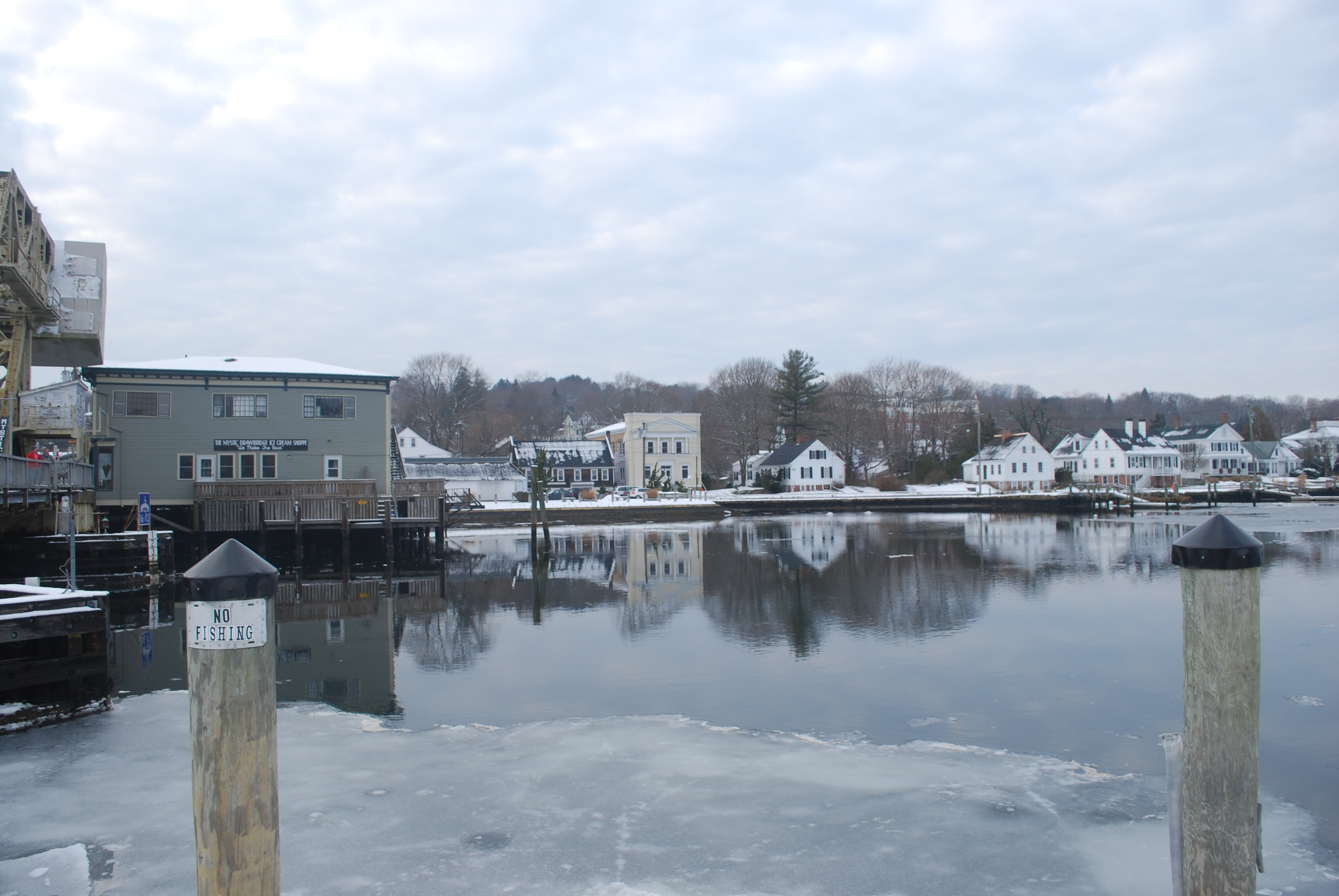

Location
- Country: United States

Physical characteristics
- Source
  - location: Connecticut
- Mouth
  - location: Long Island Sound
- Length: 3.4 mi (5.5 km)

The Mystic River is a 3.4-mile-long (5.5 km) estuary in the southeast corner of the U.S. state of Connecticut. Its main tributary is Whitford Brook. It empties into Fishers Island Sound, dividing the village of Mystic, Connecticut between the towns of Groton and Stonington. Much of the river is tidal. The Mystic River was the location of three large shipbuilding firms during the 19th-century, and it is now the home of the Mystic Seaport maritime museum. The name Mystic is derived from the Pequot term "missi-tuk", describing a large river whose waters are driven into waves by tides or wind, according to the Mystic River Historical Society.

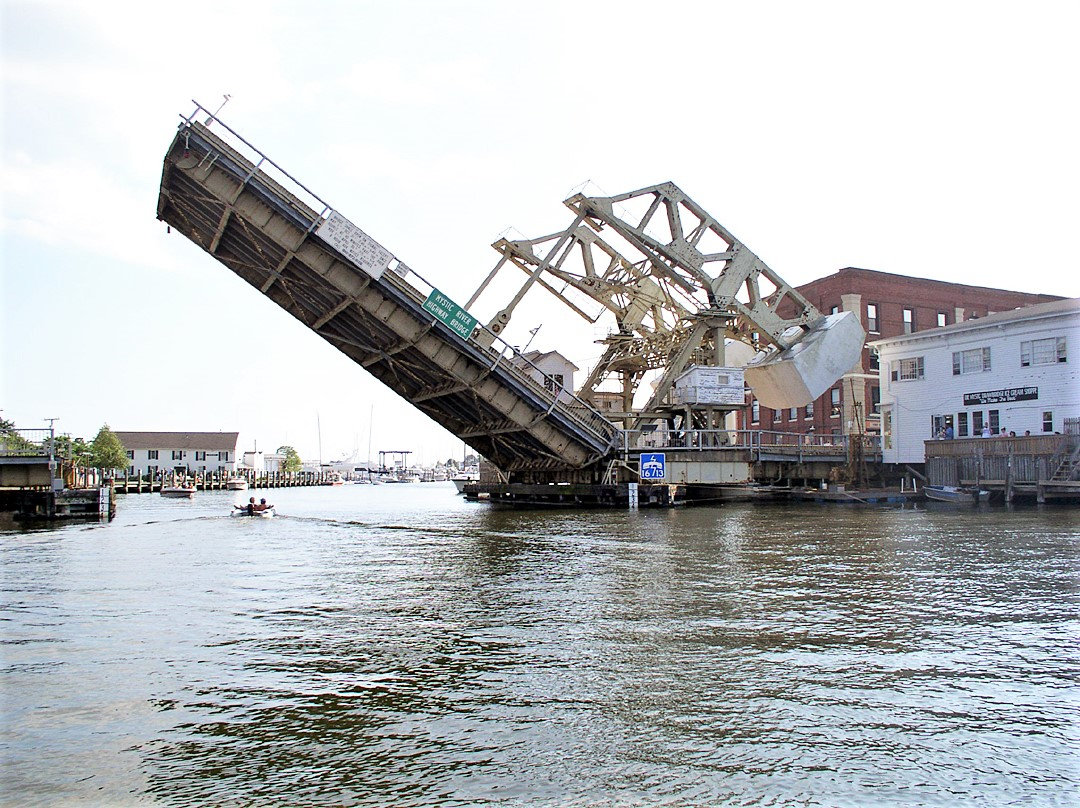
Mystic River Bascule Bridge

== History ==
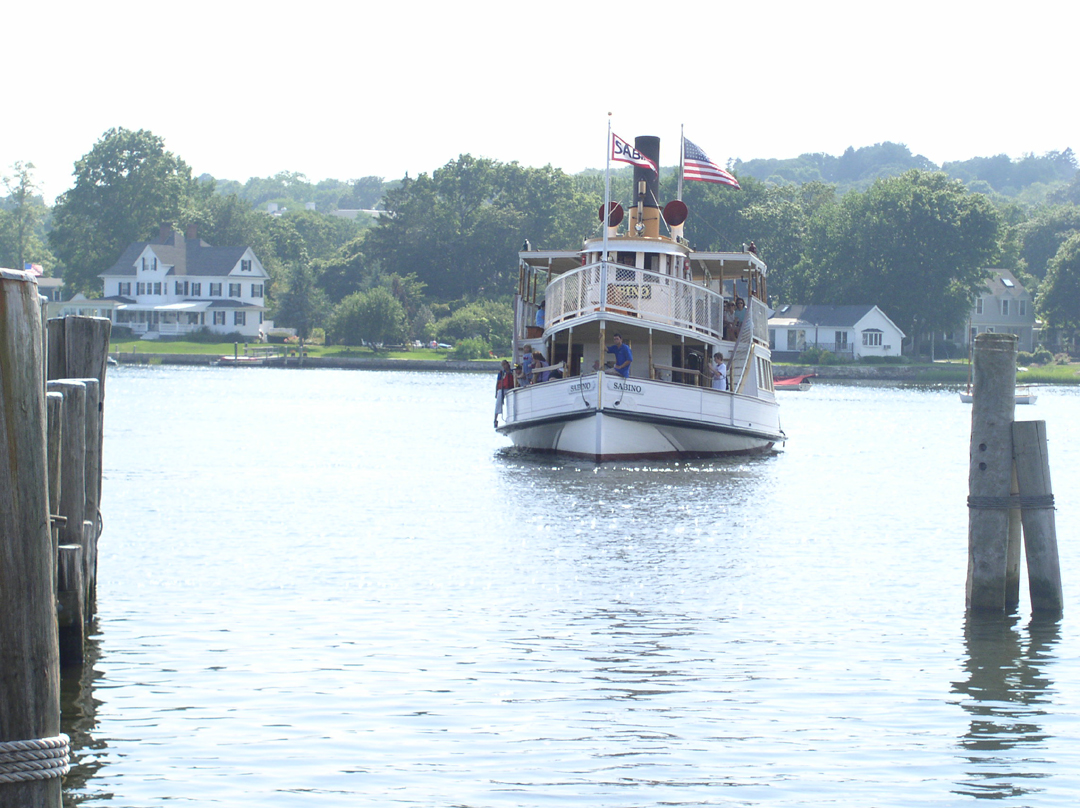
The Sabino traveling along the Mystic River

The Pequot Indians built a village called Siccanemos overlooking the western bank of the Mystic River, but it was destroyed during the Pequot War on May 26, 1637, the day of the Mystic massacre.

== See also ==
- List of rivers of Connecticut
- Mystic Seaport
- Mystic River Bascule Bridge
- Mystic River Railroad Bridge
