= Mystic, Connecticut =

Census-designated place in Connecticut, United States

- Census-designated place
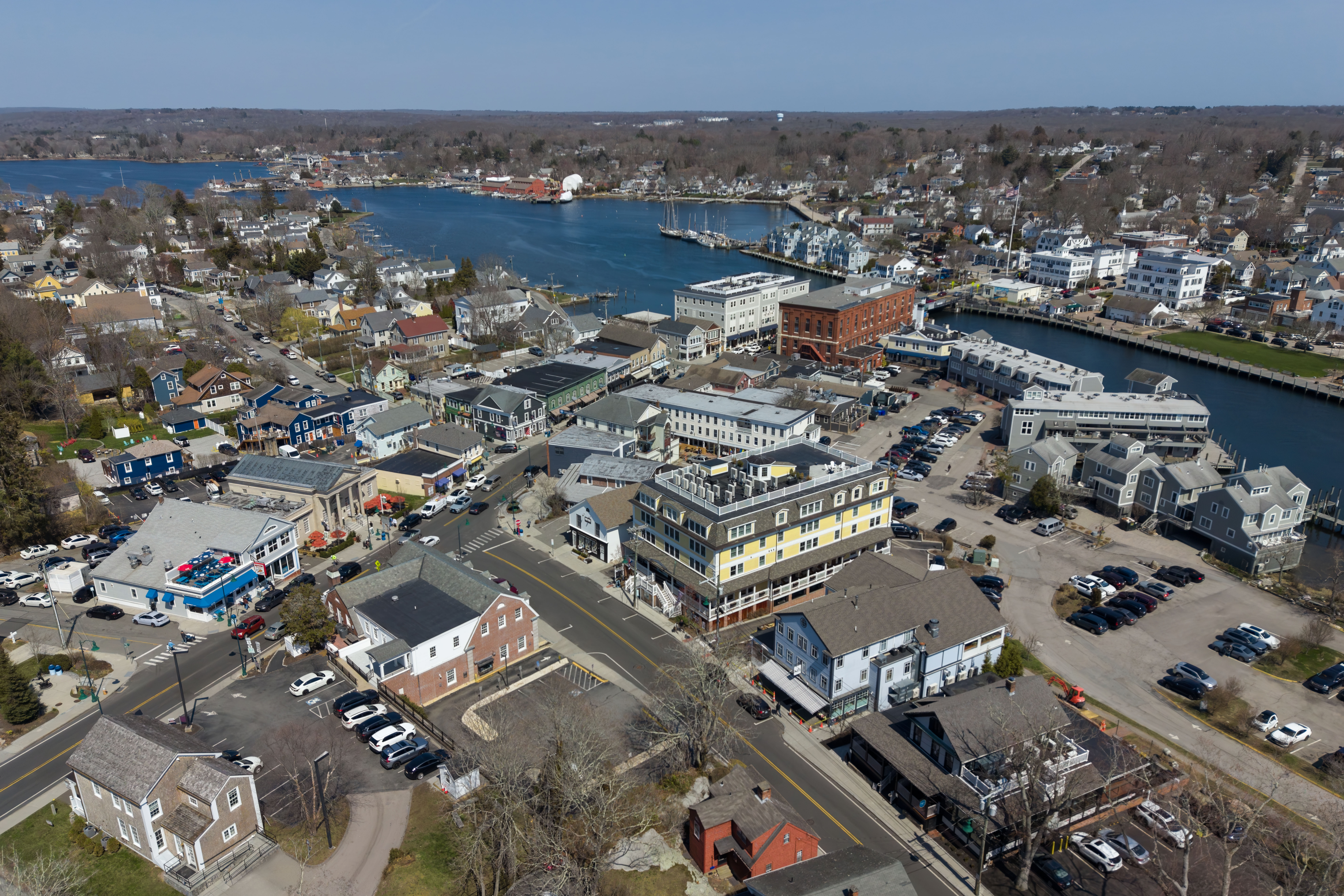
- Downtown Mystic

- Logo

- Coordinates: 41°21′15″N 71°57′59″W
- Country: United States
- U.S. state: Connecticut
- County: New London
- Region: Southeastern CT
- Towns: Groton, Stonington

Area
  - Total: 4.082 sq mi (10.57 km^{2})
  - Land: 3.649 sq mi (9.45 km^{2})
  - Water: 0.433 sq mi (1.12 km^{2})
- Elevation: 9.8 ft (3 m)

Population (2020)
  - Total: 4,348
  - Density: 1,192/sq mi (460/km^{2})
- Time zone: UTC−5 (Eastern (EST))
  - Summer (DST): UTC−4 (EDT)
- ZIP Codes: 06355, 06372, 06388
- Area code: 860
- FIPS code: 09-49810
- GNIS feature ID: 209165
- Website: mystic.org

Mystic is a village and census-designated place (CDP) in Groton and Stonington, Connecticut.

Mystic was a significant Connecticut seaport with more than 600 ships built over 135 years starting in 1784. Mystic Seaport, located in the village, is the largest maritime museum in the United States and has preserved a number of sailing ships, such as the whaling ship Charles W. Morgan. The village is located on the Mystic River which flows into Fishers Island Sound. The Mystic River Bascule Bridge crosses the river in the center of the village. The name "Mystic" is derived from the Pequot term "missi-tuk" describing a large river whose waters are driven into waves by tides or wind. The population was 4,348 at the 2020 census.

== History ==
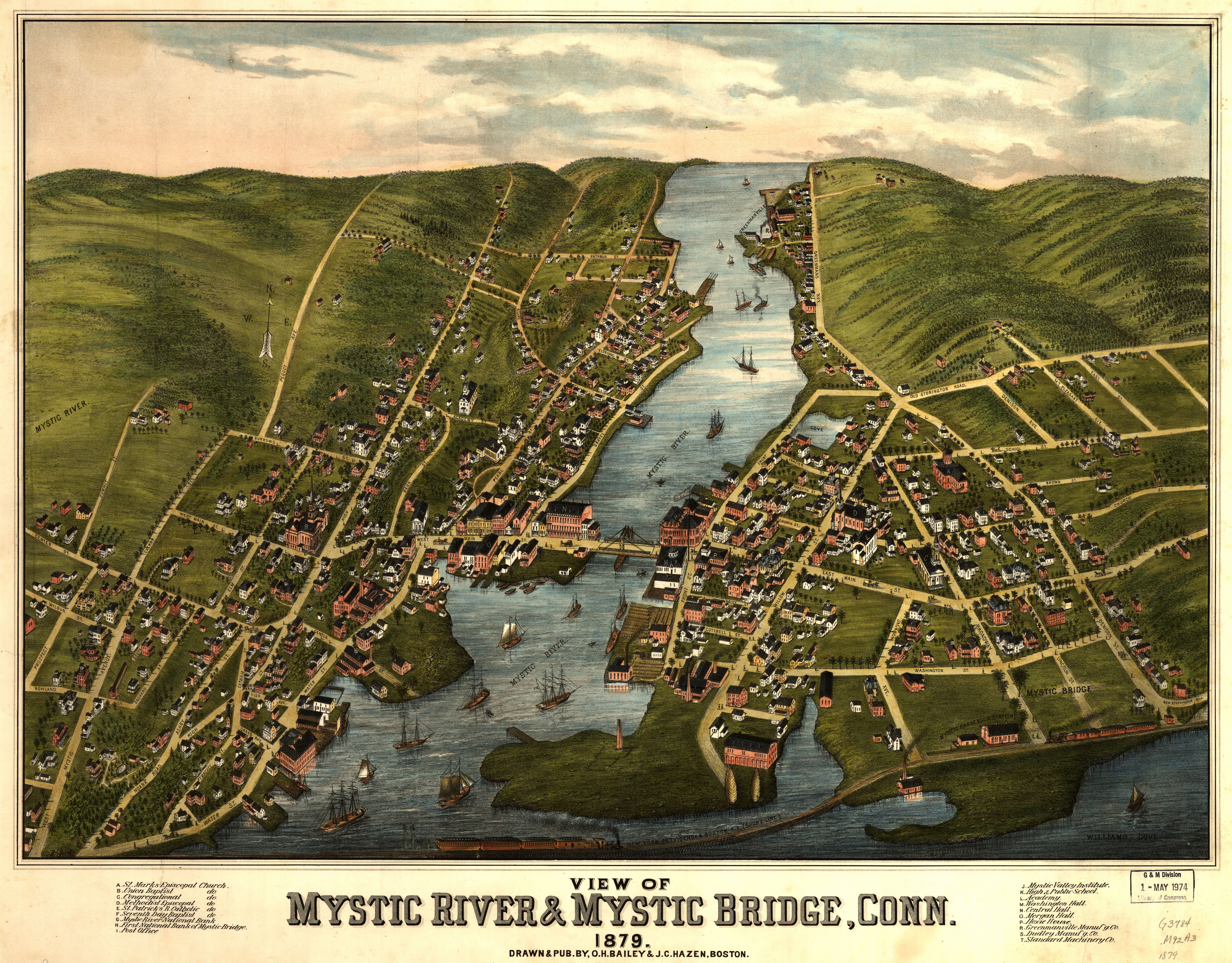
Mystic River and Mystic Bridge, Connecticut (1879)

Before the 17th century, the Pequot people lived in this portion of southeastern Connecticut. They were in control of a considerable amount of territory, extending toward the Pawcatuck River to the east and the Connecticut River to the west.

To the northwest, the Five Nations of the Haudenosaunee dominated the land linked by the Great Lakes and the Hudson River, allowing trading to occur between the Haudenosaunee and the Dutch. The Pequots were settled just distant enough to be secure from any danger that the Haudenosaunee posed. The Pequot War profoundly affected the Mystic area between 1636 and 1638. In May 1637, captains John Underhill and John Mason led a mission through Narragansett land, along with their allies the Narragansetts and Mohegans, and struck the Pequot Indian settlement in Mystic in the event which came to be known as the Mystic massacre. On September 21, 1638, the colonists signed the Treaty of Hartford, officially ending the Pequot War.

=== English settlement ===
Pequot control of the Mystic area ended after the Pequot War, and English settlements increased. By the 1640s, Connecticut Colony began to grant land to the Pequot War veterans. John Winthrop the Younger was among those to receive property, much of which was in southeastern Connecticut. Other early settlers in the Mystic area included Robert Burrows and George Denison, who held land in the Mystic River Valley.

Settlement grew slowly. The Connecticut government and Massachusetts Bay government began to quarrel over boundaries, thus causing some conflicting claims concerning governmental authority between the Mystic River and the Pawcatuck River. In the 1640s and 1650s, "Connecticut" referred to settlements located along the Connecticut River, as well as its claims in other parts of the region. Massachusetts Bay, however, claimed to have authority over Stonington and even into Rhode Island.

Connecticut did not have a royal charter that separated it from the Massachusetts Bay Colony; the Connecticut General Court was formed by leaders of the settlements. The General Court claimed rule of the area by right of conquest, but the Massachusetts Bay Colony saw matters differently. The Bay Colony had contributed to the war by sending a militia under captains John Underhill and Thomas Stoughton, which they argued gave territorial rights and authority to the Massachusetts Bay Colony rather than the Connecticut Court.

Both colonies turned to the United Colonies of New England to resolve the dispute. The United Colonies of New England was formed in 1643, established to settle disputes such as this one. They voted to establish the boundary between the claims of Massachusetts Bay and Connecticut at the Thames River. As a result, Connecticut would be positioned west of the river, and Massachusetts Bay could have the land to the east, including the Mystic River.

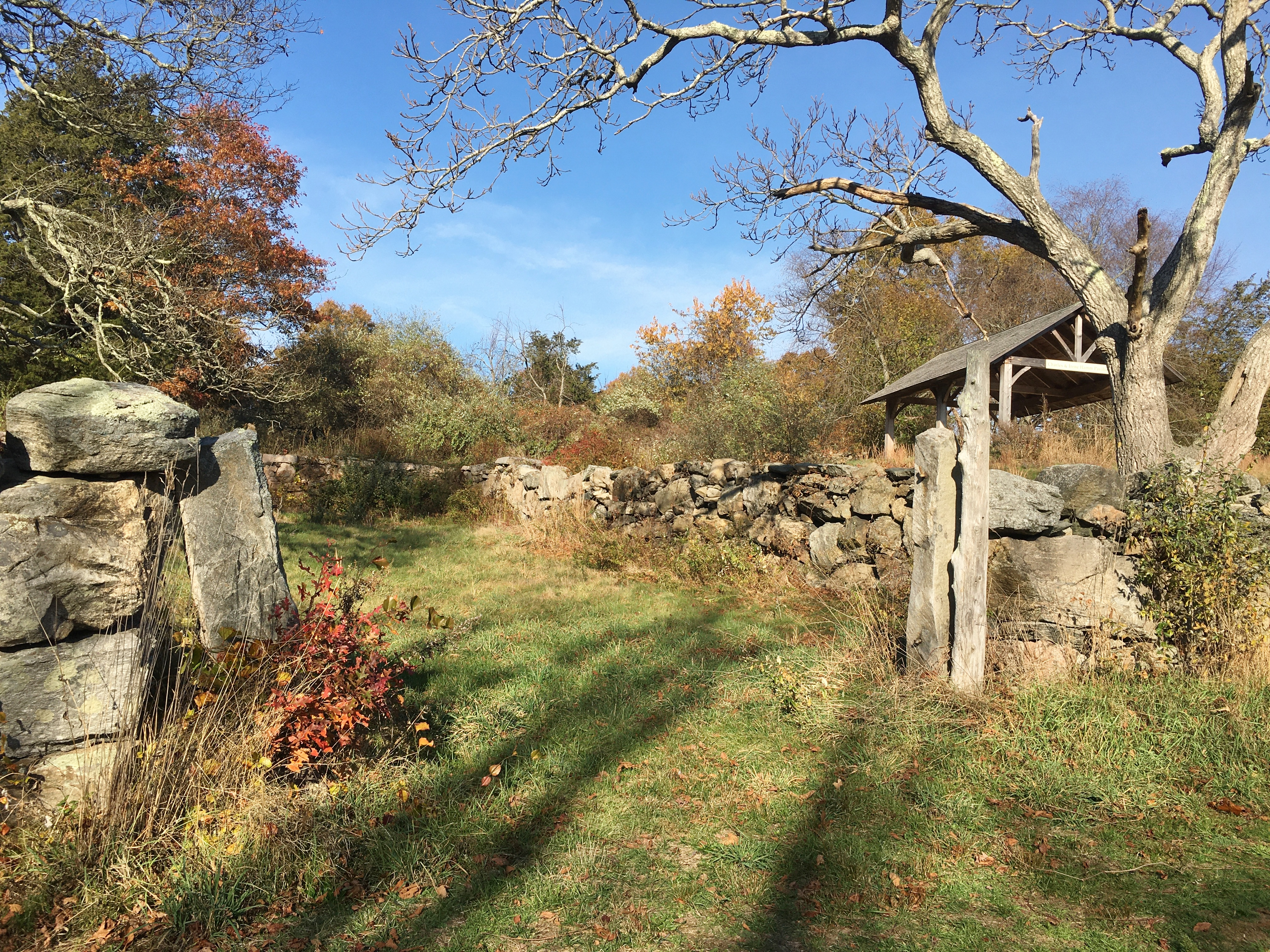
Coogan Farm at the Denison Pequotsepos Nature Center, a historic farm property in the area of Mystic where John Gallup, John Mason, and George Denison settled

Throughout the next decade, colonists were beginning to settle around the Mystic River. John Mason was one of the captains who led the colonists against the Pequots, and he had been granted 500 acres (2 km^{2}) on the eastern banks of the Mystic River. He also received the island that bears his name, though he never lived on the property. In 1653, John Gallup Jr. was given 300 acres (1.2 km^{2}) approximately midway up the east part of the Mystic River.

Within the same year, others joined John Gallup and began to settle around the Mystic River. George Denison, a veteran of Oliver Cromwell's army, was given his own strip of 300 acres (1.2 km^{2}) just south of Gallup's land in 1654. Thomas Miner had immigrated to Massachusetts with John Winthrop and was granted many land plots, the main one lying on Quiambaug Cove, just east of the Mystic River. Other families granted land were Reverend Robert Blinman, the Beebe brothers, Thomas Parke, and Connecticut Governor John Hayne.

Not all these men actually lived on their land. Many sold it to profit from or employed an overseer to cultivate their property. Many men, however, actually brought their wives and children, which indicated their plans on forming a community in the Mystic River Valley.

There was one recorded case of a woman who did not come to the Mystic River Valley as a wife. Widow Margaret Lake received a grant from the Massachusetts Bay authority and was the only woman to receive a land grant in her own name. She also did not live on her land but hired other people to maintain it. She took up residence in Lakes Pond. Her daughter was married to John Gallup, while her sister was married to Massachusetts Bay Governor John Winthrop.

By 1675, settlement had grown tremendously in the Mystic River Valley, and infrastructure was beginning to appear as well as an economy. The Pequot Trail was used as a main highway to get around the Mystic River and played a vital role in the settlers' lives, allowing them to transport livestock, crops, furs, and other equipment to and from their farm lands. However, those families living on the east side of the Mystic River were unable to make any use of the Pequot Trail. As early as 1660, Robert Burrows was authorized to institute a ferry somewhere along the middle of the river's length. This earned his home the name of "Half-way House".

The Pequot Trail also connected the settlers to their church. Stonington residents found it difficult to attend church in Mystic or Groton, and this led to the creation of their own church. The town of Stonington was then established as separate from Mystic in regards to church attendance and was granted leave to build a church of their own. The building became known as the Road Church.

Colonists began public schools in this area around 1679, and John Fish became the first schoolmaster in Stonington, conducting classes and lessons in his home. Education was a very important thing to the New England colonists, enabling children and servants to learn literacy skills. Most families throughout New England had six or more children in each household, giving Fish plenty of students.

=== 18th century ===
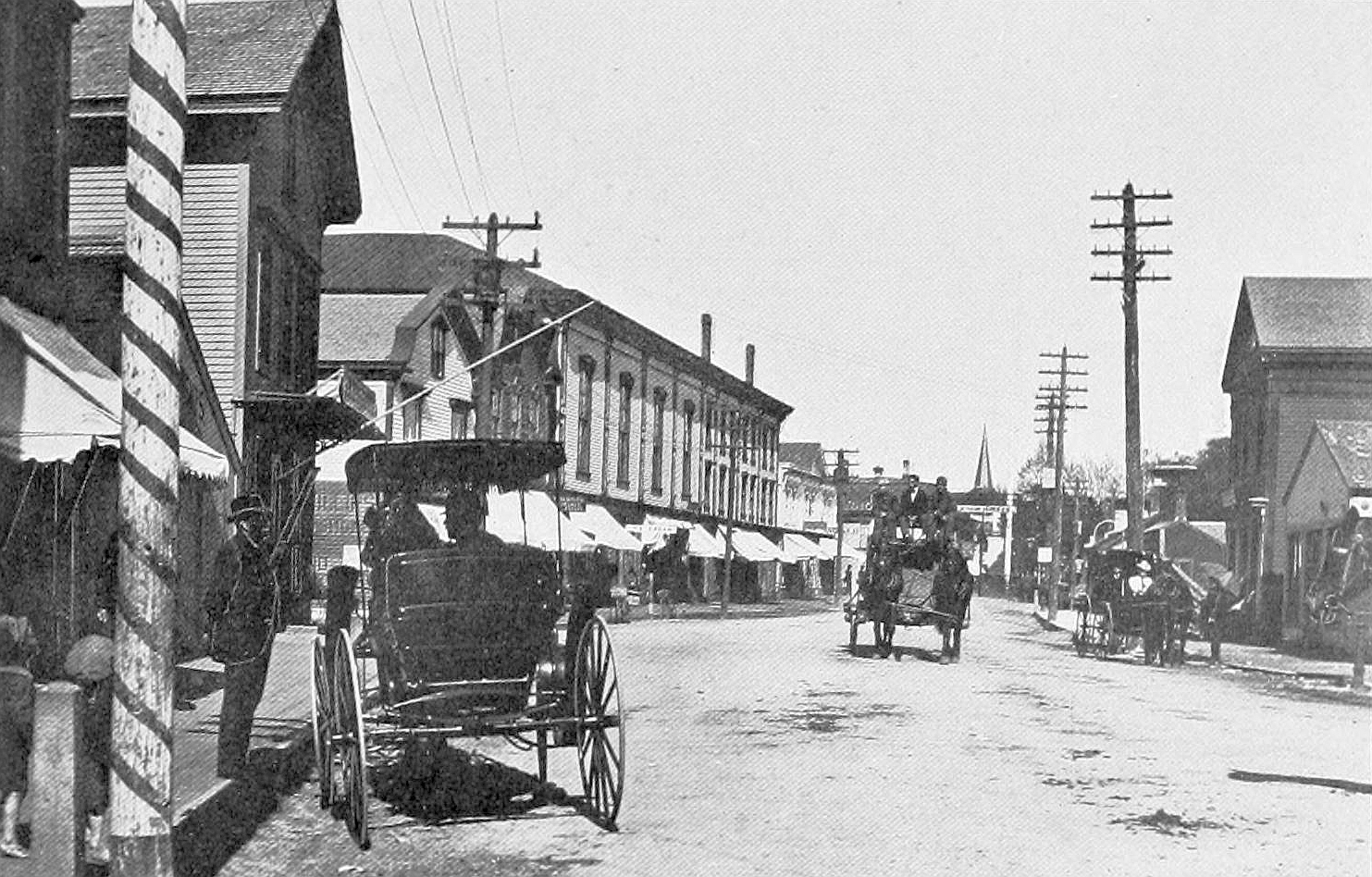
Main Street (circa 1901)

By the first decade of the 18th century, three villages had begun to develop along the Mystic River. The largest village was called Mystic (Old Mystic), also known as the Head of the River because it lay where several creeks united into the Mystic River estuary. Two villages lay farther down the river. One was called Stonington and was considered to be Lower Mystic, consisting of twelve houses by the early 19th century. These twelve houses lay along Willow Street, which ended at the ferry landing. This became the Stonington side of the village of Mystic. On the opposite bank of the river in the town of Groton stood the village that became known as Portersville. This is the Groton side of the village of Mystic.

=== National Register of Historic Places ===
Mystic has three historic districts: the Mystic Bridge Historic District around U.S. Route 1 and Route 27, Rossie Velvet Mill Historic District between Pleasant Street and Bruggeman Place, and the Mystic River Historic District around U.S. Route 1 and Route 215. Other historic sites in Mystic are:

- Joseph Conrad (ship) at Mystic Seaport Museum
- Charles W. Morgan (ship) at Mystic Seaport Museum
- Emma C. Berry (sloop) at Mystic Seaport Museum
- L. A. Dunton (schooner) at Mystic Seaport Museum
- Pequotsepos Manor on Pequotsepos Road
- Sabino (steamer) at Mystic Seaport Museum

== Geography ==
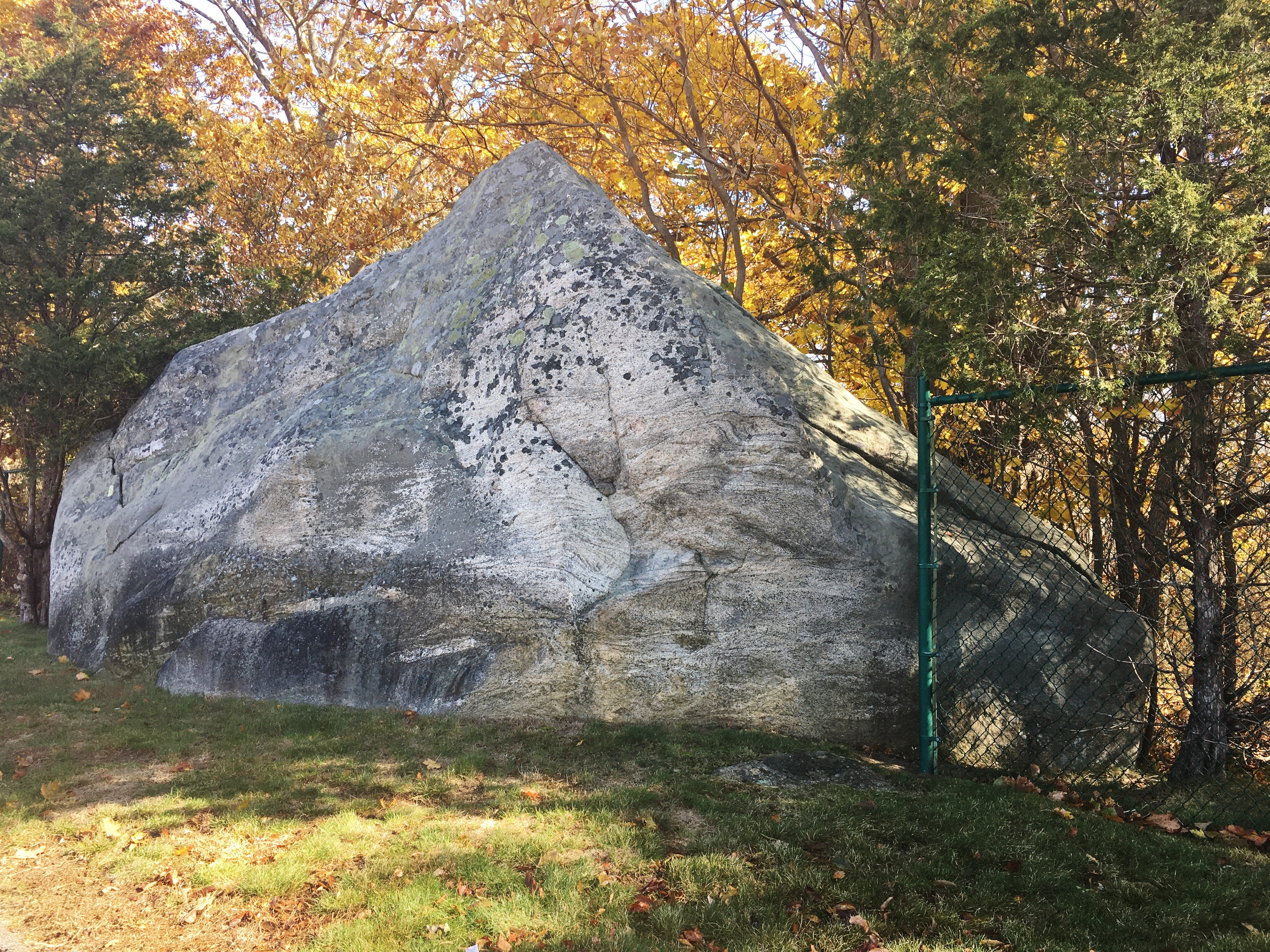
Large boulder (glacial erratic) at Big Y parking lot on Stonington Road

According to the United States Census Bureau, the CDP has a total area of 4.08 square miles (10.6 km^{2}), of which 3.65 square miles (9.5 km^{2}) is land and 0.43 square miles (1.1 km^{2}), or 10.6%, is water. The village is on the east and west bank of the estuary of the Mystic River. Mason's Island (Pequot language: Chippachaug) fills the south end of the estuary. Most of the bedrock of Mystic is "gneissic, crystalline terrane extending from eastern Massachusetts through western Rhode Island and across southeastern Connecticut north of Long Island Sound," according to geologist Richard Goldsmith.

== Tourism ==
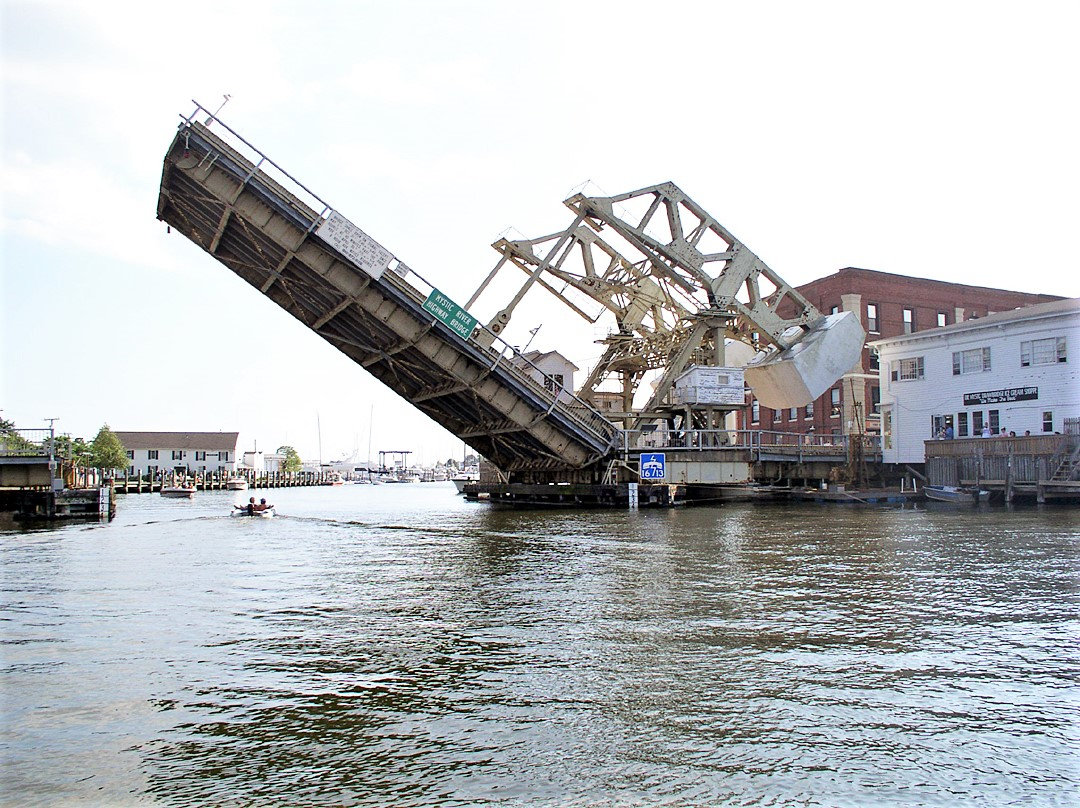
Mystic River Bascule Bridge being raised

The village is a major New England tourist destination. It is home to the Mystic Aquarium & Institute for Exploration, known for its research department, concern with marine life rehabilitation, and its popular beluga whales. The business district contains many restaurants on either side of the bascule bridge where U.S. Route 1 crosses the Mystic River. Local sailing cruises are available on the traditional sailing ship Argia. Short day tours and longer evening cruises are available on the 1908 steamer Sabino departing Mystic Seaport.

Mystic Seaport is the nation's leading maritime museum and one of the premier maritime museums in the world, founded in 1929. It is the home of four National Historic Landmark vessels, including the 1841 whaleship Charles W. Morgan, the oldest merchant vessel in the country. The museum's collections and exhibits include over 500 historic watercraft, a major research library, a large gallery of maritime art, a unique diorama displaying the town of Mystic as it was in the 19th century, a working ship restoration shipyard, a planetarium, and a recreation of a 19th-century seafaring village.

Mystic Museum of Art at 9 Water Street features works by members of the Mystic Art Colony along with other contemporary American art. The 2013 Moondance International Film Festival was held in Mystic.

The town is located near Foxwoods Resort Casino and Mohegan Sun, two prominent Native American operated integrated resorts.

== Demographics ==
Historical population
Census	Pop.	Note	%±
1990	2,618		—
2000	4,001		52.8%
2010	4,205		5.1%
2020	4,348		3.4%

=== 2020 census ===
As of the 2020 census, Mystic had a population of 4,348. The median age was 58.0 years. 10.9% of residents were under the age of 18 and 37.4% were 65 years of age or older. For every 100 females, there were 92.2 males, and for every 100 females age 18 and over there were 91.4 males age 18 and over.

According to the 2020 census, 99.7% of residents lived in urban areas, while 0.3% lived in rural areas.

There were 1,982 households, of which 15.3% had children under the age of 18 living in them. Of all households, 41.0% were married-couple households, 22.1% were households with a male householder and no spouse or partner present, and 31.1% were households with a female householder and no spouse or partner present. About 44.6% of all households were made up of individuals, and 22.9% had someone living alone who was 65 years of age or older.

There were 2,332 housing units, of which 15.0% were vacant. The homeowner vacancy rate was 1.1% and the rental vacancy rate was 8.2%.

Racial composition as of the 2020 census
Race	Number	Percent
White	3,946	90.8%
Black or African American	41	0.9%
American Indian and Alaska Native	10	0.2%
Asian	80	1.8%
Native Hawaiian and Other Pacific Islander	4	0.1%
Some other race	40	0.9%
Two or more races	227	5.2%
Hispanic or Latino (of any race)	129	3.0%

=== 2000 census ===
As of the census of 2000, there were 4,001 people, 1,797 households, and 995 families residing in the CDP. The population density was 1,192.7 inhabitants per square mile (460.5/km^{2}). There were 1,988 housing units at an average density of 592.6 per square mile (228.8/km^{2}). The racial makeup of the CDP was 95.8% White, 0.8% African American, 0.4% American Indian, 1.3% Asian, 0.0% Pacific Islander (i.e. 1 person), 0.3% from other races, and 1.30% from two or more races.

There were 1,797 households, out of which 20.3% had children under the age of 18 living with them, 45.6% were married couples living together, 7.0% had a female householder with no husband present, and 44.6% were non-families. 35.3% of all households were made up of individuals, and 9.1% had someone living alone who was 65 years of age or older. The average household size was 2.10 and the average family size was 2.76.

In the CDP, the age distribution of the population shows 16.7% under the age of 18, 5.4% from 18 to 24, 31.1% from 25 to 44, 27.4% from 45 to 64, and 19.4% who were 65 years of age or older. The median age was 43 years. For every 100 females, there were 92.7 males. For every 100 females age 18 and over, there were 90.1 males.

The median income for a household in the CDP was $62,236, and the median income for a family was $70,625. Males had a median income of $50,036 versus $32,400 for females. The per capita income for the CDP was $33,376. About 1.6% of families and 3.1% of the population were below the poverty line, including 1.9% of those under age 18 and 5.9% of those age 65 or over.

== Government ==
Mystic is a census-designated place (CDP) that spans the towns of Groton and Stonington, Connecticut. It is not a municipality in the state of Connecticut, and so it has no independent government.

== Transportation ==
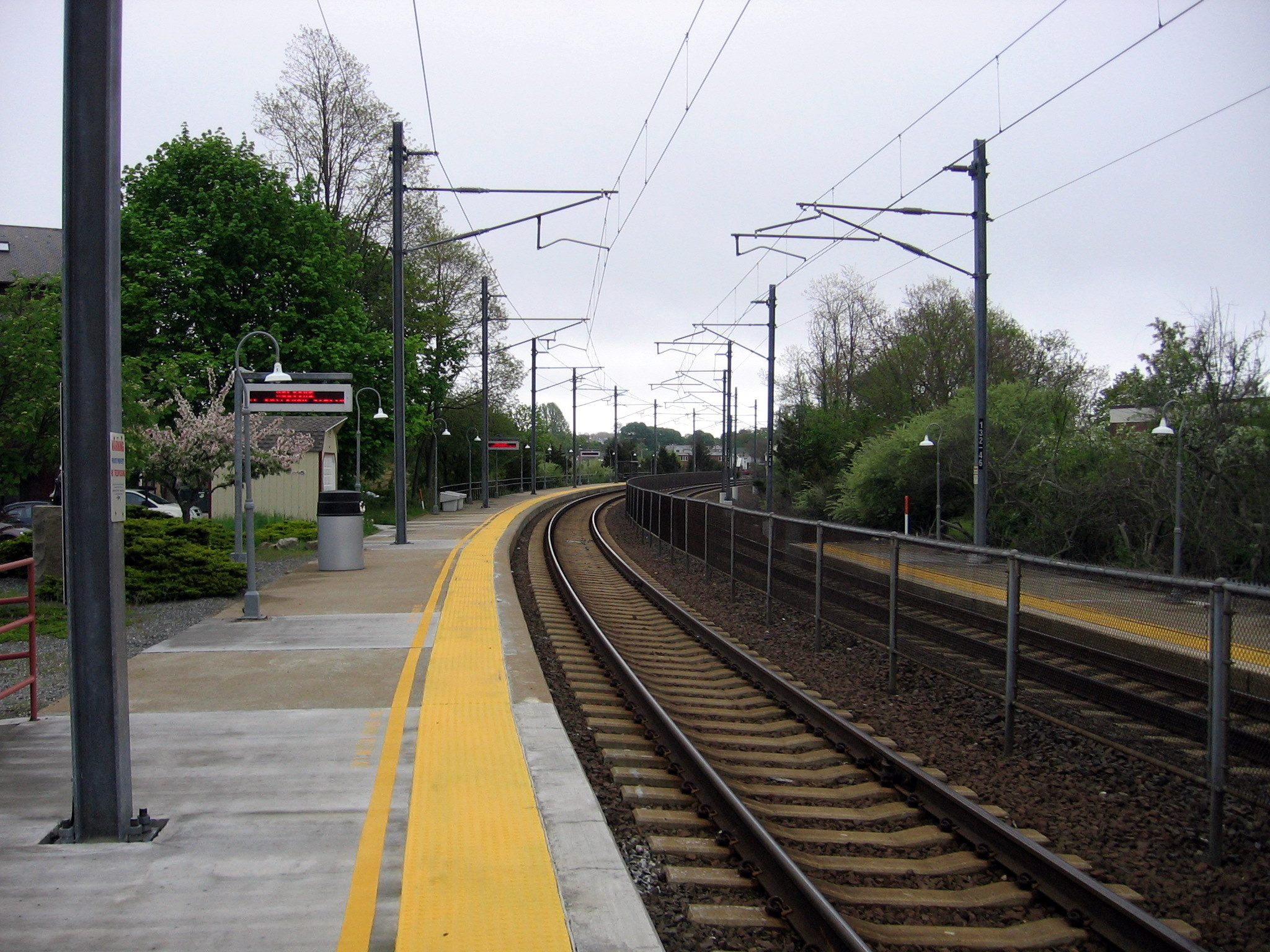
Mystic Amtrak station is served by the Northeast Regional

Amtrak stops at the Mystic station. Bus service is provided by Southeast Area Transit. Groton-New London Airport serves private and chartered flights to the area.

== Education ==
The portion in Stonington Town is in Stonington School District while the portion in Groton Town is in Groton School District.

== Notable people ==
- Mary Jobe Akeley, naturalist
- Matt Harvey, former Major League Baseball pitcher
- Sam Lacy, sportswriter
- Stephen Macht, actor
- Paul Menhart, former Major League Baseball pitcher
- Asa Packer, railroad pioneer
- Jonathan Skrmetti, Attorney General, Tennessee
- William Ledyard Stark, Nebraska politician
- George Henry Strohsahl Jr., Rear Admiral, United States Navy

== In popular culture ==
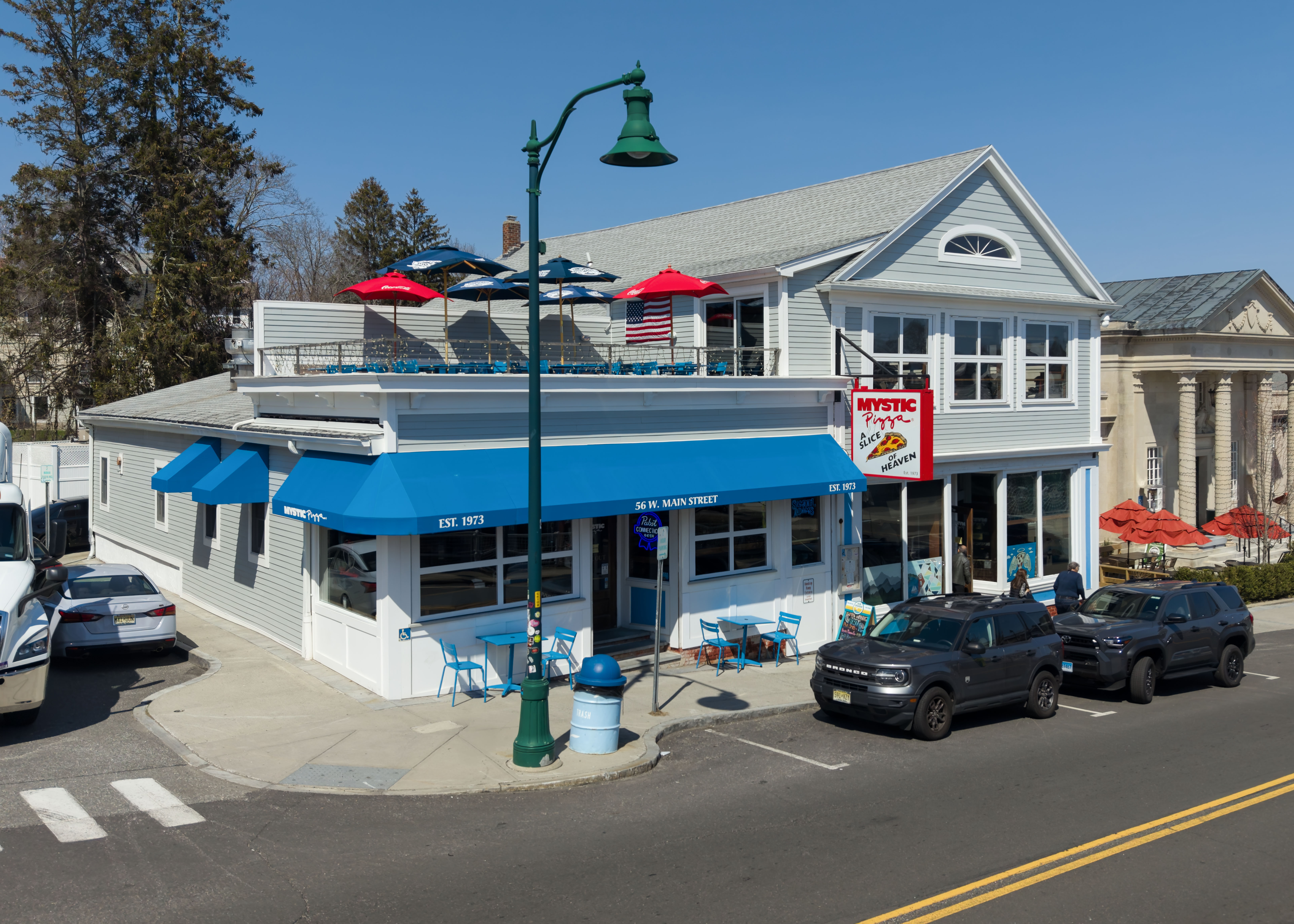
Mystic Pizza

The title of the film Mystic Pizza was inspired by a pizza shop in Mystic. Screenwriter Amy Holden Jones spent summers in the area and chose the Mystic Pizza restaurant as the focus of her story about the lives of three young waitresses.

In 1997, Steven Spielberg shot various scenes for the film Amistad at Mystic Seaport. One commercial was filmed in 2005 at Mystic Seaport for FedEx. It was based on the lobster business in New England. The commercial was aired during the Orange Bowl.

== See also ==
- Mystic Seaport
- Noank, Connecticut
- Pequot War
