= Great Captain Island =

Island in the United States of America

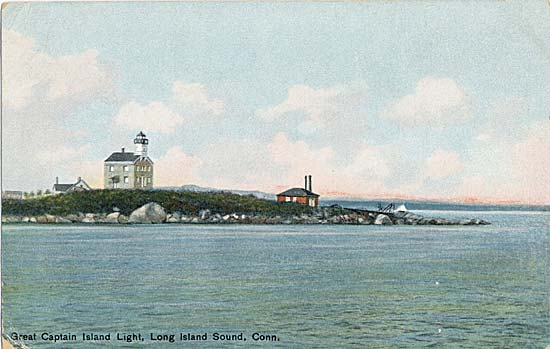
- Great Captain Island Light, from a postcard (c. 1907–1914)

- Location within Connecticut

Geography
- Location: Long Island Sound
- Coordinates: 40°58′57″N 73°37′24″W
- Area: 0.070 km^{2} (0.027 sq mi)

Administration
- United States
- State: Connecticut
- County: Fairfield
- City: Greenwich

Demographics
- Population: 3 (2012)

Great Captain Island, also known more familiarly as Great Captain's Island, is an island off the coast of Greenwich, Connecticut. The 17.2-acre (7.0 ha) island is the largest of a three-island group that also includes Little Captain and Wee Captain. The island is a remnant of a glacial moraine and has a large glacial erratic on the southern side, the island's east and west sides are connected by a tombolo. The island has had several owners, but has been owned in whole by the Town of Greenwich since 1973. The island is home to the Great Captain Island Light, a 19th-century lighthouse that was restored in 2009 and relit as a non-navigational aid in 2012. The actual navigation aid is a skeletal tower erected in 1970. Great Captain Island is one of the state's 26 "important bird areas" according to the Connecticut Audubon Society. The town operates a ferry service to and from the island from about the second week in June through the second week of September. Trails have been laid out for visitors, and the western part of the island has picnic tables, grills, restrooms, and posted swimming areas. The island is open year round, with a ferry running during the summer. No public tours of the lighthouse or island are available.

== Location and geology ==
The 17.2-acre (70,000 m^{2}) island is the largest of a three-island group that also includes Little Captain and Wee Captain. The island is the southernmost point of land in not only Connecticut, but New England. The Town of Greenwich states that the Great Captain Island "is a remnant of a glacial moraine. It contains a diversity of rock types- gneiss, schist, granite-with a very large glacial erratic on the southern side." The island's east and west sides are connected by a tombolo, and the southern side has a lagoon that winds its way around the lighthouse. It is near many harbors such as Port Chester Harbor

== History ==
There are two theories for how the island got its name, the first of which is that the island is named after Captain Kidd who was rumored to have buried a treasure of gold and silver on it. While the treasure has never been found, it is said to be buried near the tide line on the southwestern tip closest to the city Kidd called home. The Town of Greenwich acknowledges both this and another theory that states that "[t]he "Captain" of the title reportedly memorializes Captain Daniel Patrick, a partner in the first recorded real estate transaction in Greenwich in the 1640s and the town's first military commander."

In 1763, George III granted the island to John Anderson. In 1829, the federal government purchased 3.5 acres of land on the southeast part of Great Captain Island from Samuel Lyons. The states of New York and Connecticut both claimed the island in the 19th century but, after 50 years, a commission resolved the dispute in favor of Connecticut. The lighthouse keepers and their families farmed on the tract of land and the other areas of the island were used for hunting, fishing and recreational use. In 1926, the rest of the island was sold to a developer who built and opened an exclusive clubhouse on the site. Opening in 1930, at the beginning of the Great Depression, it soon was closed. The Town of Greenwich acquired the island through foreclosure and sold the property to Port-Green Corporation. During this time, the Coast Guard inadvertently destroyed the clubhouse by dropping flares on it while searching for a missing plane. A fire in 1955 would destroy the rest of the club. In 1955, Areotech Industries purchased the island and used it as an employee recreational spot and built cabana cottages on it in 1957. During its ownership with Areotech, it was re-named Huckleberry Island, until the Town of Greenwich purchased it in 1966 for $90,000. In 1973, the federal government turned over the remaining tract of land upon which the lighthouse rests.

== Lighthouse ==
The Great Captain Island Light was first constructed in 1829 on the 3.5-acre tract of land that Samuel Lyons sold to the government. The lighthouse was of poor construction and was replaced in 1868 with a new granite dwelling with attached lantern. The lighthouse is of the same design as lighthouses at Sheffield Island in Norwalk; Morgan Point in Noank; Old Field Point Light and Plum Island in New York; and Block Island North in Rhode Island. The lighthouse was deactivated in 1970 when a skeletal tower replaced it. The Town of Greenwich acquired the property in 1973 and had full-time caretakers on the site until the lighthouse became too dilapidated in 2003. A successful restoration effort was completed in 2009 and a non-navigational light was activated in 2012. In 1991, the Great Captain Island Light was added to the National Register of Historic Places. In 2010, a September 11 memorial plaque was installed to "honor the 23 people who lived in Greenwich, or had a connection to the town", who died in the September 11 attacks". A non-navigational 4-second flashing green light was installed in the lighthouse on February 13, 2012. The lighthouse is currently occupied by a family who act as caretakers of the property.

== Wildlife ==
Great Captain Island is one of the state's 26 "important bird areas" that provide an essential habitat for one or more bird species, according to the Connecticut Audubon Society. Great blue herons have been on the island since the 1990s. Great egrets, snowy egrets, and black-crowned night herons also live on the island. The island was once known as the state's largest heron and egret rookery, but in the early 2000s their populations shrunk dramatically, with summer counts down from a total of 364 in 1998 to 98 in 2004. Patrick Comins, director of bird conservation for Audubon Connecticut, thinks that the bird populations have been hurt by human disturbances and possibly by competition from cormorants and a great horned owl that lives on the island and has fed on the birds. Comins also said that overall pollution in Long Island Sound waters might also have an effect.

Wading bird populations on the island by year

| Name | 1998 | 2001 | 2004 |
|---|---|---|---|
| Great egret | 46 | 98 | 24 |
| Snowy egret | 139 | 40 | 33 |
| Black-crowned night heron | 179 | 150 | 41 |
| Total | 364 | 298 | 98 |

In the uplands of the island, an area that used to be lawn has been replaced with oak, hickory, ash, cherry, tree of heaven and sassafras. By the lighthouse, several openings in the shrubbery have been made to provide a variety of habitats for wildlife and a barrier of shrubs has been planted on the cliffs east of the lighthouse.

== Access ==
The town operates a ferry service to and from the island from about the second week in June through the second week of September. Trails have been laid out for visitors, and the western part of the island has picnic tables, grills, restrooms, and posted swimming areas. The island is open year round, with a ferry running during the summer. No public tours of the lighthouse or island are available. In 2012, Hurricane Sandy damaged the area and washed away the walkway.
