= Plum Island Light =

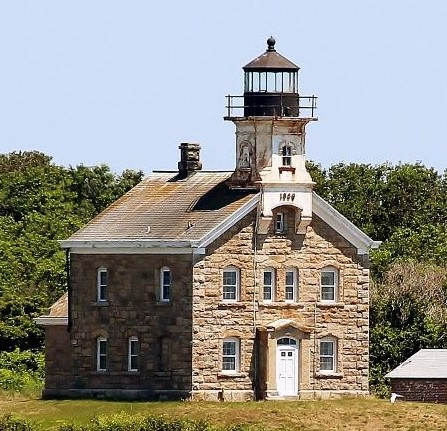
- The decommissioned lighthouse pictured in 2012.
- Location: Plum Island (New York)
- Coordinates: 41°10′25.20″N 72°12′41.47″W

Tower
- Construction: second light on granite house (1869) metal tower (1978)
- Automated: 1978
- Height: 50 feet (15 m) from sea level
- Heritage: National Register of Historic Places listed place

Light
- First lit: 1827
- Focal height: 15 m (49 ft)
- Lens: 10 whale oil lamps (1827); Sixth-order fresnel (1856); Fourth-order fresnel (1897); Automated flash (1978)
- Range: 5 nautical miles (9.3 km)
- Characteristic: 2.5 second White flash
- Plum Island Light Station
- U.S. National Register of Historic Places
- NRHP reference No.: 11000014
- Added to NRHP: February 11, 2011

Plum Island Light is located on the western end of Plum Island, which lies in the Long Island Sound, east of Orient Point at the end of the North Fork of Long Island, New York. A historic granite lighthouse originally built in 1869 sits at the site, but no longer serves as an active aid to navigation. It was listed on the National Register of Historic Places in 2011.

A short distance northwest is a 14 feet (4.3 m) metal tower that holds the automated light that has served as an aid to navigation since the earlier light was decommissioned in 1978.

== History ==
In 1826, the west end of Plum Island was purchased from Richard Jerome for $90 for the purpose of building a lighthouse. The following year a 35-foot-high (11 m) stone tower had been constructed to support the first light. That first light consisted of ten whale oil lamps with reflectors. The light helped navigation near the entrance to Long Island Sound, especially through the "Plum Gut" channel between Orient Point and Plum Island. In 1856, the original lamps and reflectors were replaced by a sixth-order Fresnel lens.

By the late 1860s, the lighthouse was falling into disrepair. A new 55-foot-tall (17 m) granite lighthouse building was constructed and in service by 1869. The structure is of the same design as lighthouses at Sheffield Island in Norwalk, Connecticut; Morgan Point in Noank, Connecticut; Great Captain Island in Greenwich, Connecticut, Old Field Point in Old Field, New York; and Block Island North on Block Island Rhode Island. The sixth-order lens from the original lighthouse had been moved to the new building; it was changed to a newer fourth-order lens in 1897.

In 1897, Fort Terry was built on Plum Island. The relations between lighthouse keepers and army personnel remained congenial for many years, and the keepers could usually purchase food and supplies at the Fort commissary. But in 1916, an order came down and the keeper at Plum Island Light was informed that purchasing supplies at Fort Terry was no longer allowed. The rule forced William Chapel, the keeper at the time, to sail over a mile to Orient, or 12 miles (19 km) to New London to purchase supplies. Eventually, the United States Lighthouse Service was able to persuade the Army that lighthouse keepers should once again be allowed to purchase supplies at army commissaries.

Starting in 1939, the Lighthouse Service duties were taken over by the United States Coast Guard. Coast-Guard-employed keepers were removed from Plum Island in 1978 when the light was automated on a structure built to the side of the 1869 lighthouse.

In 1994, the Fresnel lens was removed from the lighthouse and moved to the East End Seaport Museum in Greenport, where it is on display.

Starting in 2000, the East End Lighthouses group (distinct from the Seaport Museum organization) was formed and has been working since that time with various government agencies to refurbish, and to hopefully eventually relight, the Plum Island light as an active aid to navigation. On April 24, 2007, a resolution was passed by the Town of Southold that will transfer ownership of the lighthouse to the town.

The Plum Island Lighthouse is not open for public visits except for community stakeholder groups who are considered for access to Plum Island on a case-by-case basis through the United States Department of Homeland Security. The light may be seen from the water, but landing on the island is restricted to persons authorized by the Department of Homeland Security for official business at the Plum Island Animal Disease Center.

== In popular culture ==
The Archives Center at the Smithsonian National Museum of American History has a collection (#1055) of souvenir postcards of lighthouses and has digitized 272 of these and made them available online. These include postcards of Plum Island Light with links to customized nautical charts provided by National Oceanographic and Atmospheric Administration.
