= Long Island Sound link =

Proposed bridge or tunnel in the northeast US

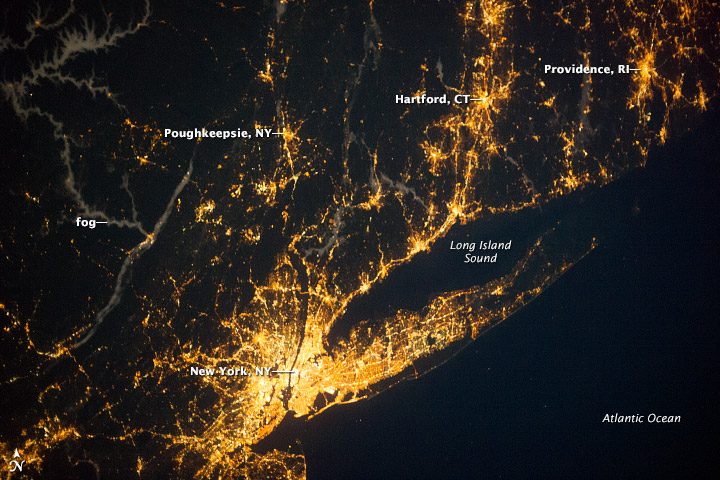
Long Island Sound at night, with nearby settlements marked

The Long Island Sound link is a proposed bridge or tunnel that would link Long Island, New York, to either Westchester County or Connecticut, across Long Island Sound east of the Throgs Neck Bridge. The project has been studied and debated since the mid-20th century. The most recent proposal is a tunnel between Rye, New York, on the mainland and Oyster Bay on the island. Feasibility studies for bridges and tunnels have been conducted for numerous entry points.

== Background ==
Western Long Island is already connected directly via tunnels and bridges to Staten Island, to Manhattan and to the Bronx; however, these connections require passing through highly congested parts of the New York metropolitan area and through New York City itself. People who wish to drive from Long Island to New York state's mainland or to any part of New England have no better option than to cross the Throgs Neck Bridge or the Bronx–Whitestone Bridge, which are located on the northwestern corner of Long Island connecting the New York City boroughs of Queens and the Bronx.

Private companies operate the automobile ferries between Port Jefferson—on north-central Long Island—and Bridgeport, Connecticut, and between Orient, much further east on Long Island's North Fork, and New London, Connecticut.

Arguments in support of a fixed crossing over Long Island Sound focus on increased motor vehicle accessibility to Long Island and reduced travel times between Long Island and the mainland. Additionally, proponents of a fixed crossing argue that Long Island's vulnerability to hurricanes necessitates a bridge across Long Island Sound to facilitate a mass evacuation from an approaching storm, as the two ferries and existing bridges in New York City lack the capacity to handle the evacuation of hundreds of thousands of Long Island residents in advance of a hurricane. Opponents of such a crossing argue that the cost of such a bridge or tunnel would be large and it would be likely to have adverse environmental impacts. Finally, the bulk of the opposition to a fixed crossing over Long Island Sound is from Connecticut, where it is widely viewed that construction of such a crossing would come at great expense while providing little-to-no benefit for Connecticut residents. If built, a span across the widest portion of the Sound between New Haven and Shoreham would be approximately 22 to 25 miles (35 to 40 km) in length, possibly making it one of the longest bridges in the world.

== Routes ==
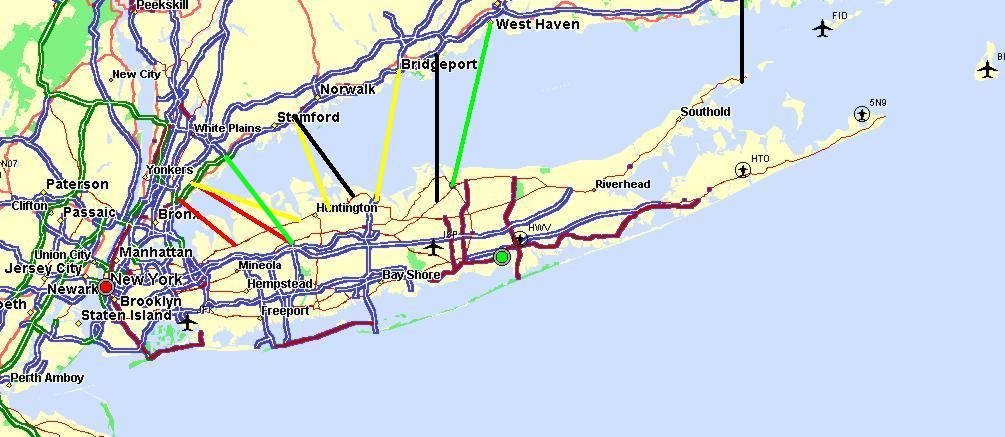
Map of the proposed bridges or tunnels crossing the Long Island sound

Several routes have been proposed:

1. A bridge or tunnel connecting Rye in Westchester County with Oyster Bay on Long Island. This would extend Interstate 287 onto Long Island via the existing Seaford–Oyster Bay Expressway in Nassau County.
2. An alternative bridge connecting Rye to the city of Glen Cove on Long Island. This bridge would have connected to the Glen Cove Arterial Highway on Long Island.
3. A bridge connecting Asharoken, New York, to Norwalk, Connecticut. This bridge would have connected to a completed version of the Babylon–Northport Expressway in western Suffolk County. The bridge and expressway would form an extension of U.S. Route 7, which currently ends at Interstate 95 in Norwalk.
4. A bridge connecting either New Haven or East Haven, Connecticut, with Shoreham, New York, on Long Island. This bridge would be an extension of Interstate 91 which would continue through Long Island via the already existing William Floyd Parkway, which itself would be upgraded to interstate standards at least to the Long Island Expressway in Yaphank and possibly as far as Sunrise Highway in Shirley.

== Plan history ==
=== 1957 plan ===
In 1957, a plan for a bridge to Westchester County across Long Island Sound was first proposed by Charles H. Sells, a former commissioner for the New York State Department of Public Works. His proposal for the Oyster Bay – Rye Bridge, along with an eastern bridge between Orient Point and Watch Hill, Rhode Island, were two proposed bridge routes off Long Island. Sells, however, suggested that the bridges' construction would not be necessary until Long Island's traffic and commuting began to increase.

In seven years, Long Island underwent the transformation that Sells had expected, and the east–west arterials between Long Island and New York City, such as the Northern State Parkway and the Long Island Expressway, were congested with commuters. Motorists bound for New England or upstate regions of New York had to take the Throgs Neck Bridge or the Bronx–Whitestone Bridge, both bridges already reaching their designed capacities. Robert Moses, chairman of the Triborough Bridge and Tunnel Authority, worked with the Department of Public Works to commission a $150,000 study in 1964 by the firm Madigan-Hyland to study the feasibility of a bridge across the sound.

Moses revealed the results of the study to the Nassau and Suffolk Regional Planning Board in February 1966. The Oyster Bay – Rye Bridge (originally the Bayville – Rye Bridge) was proposed to complete the Interstate 287 beltway around the New York Metropolitan Area. This was to be done by constructing a 6.1-mile-long (9.8 km) cable-stayed suspension bridge from the Cross Westchester Expressway (I-287) in Rye to the Seaford – Oyster Bay Expressway (NY 135) in Nassau County. The proposed bridge was to cost $150 million (1966 USD) and had the support of New York Governor Nelson Rockefeller and many officials on Long Island.

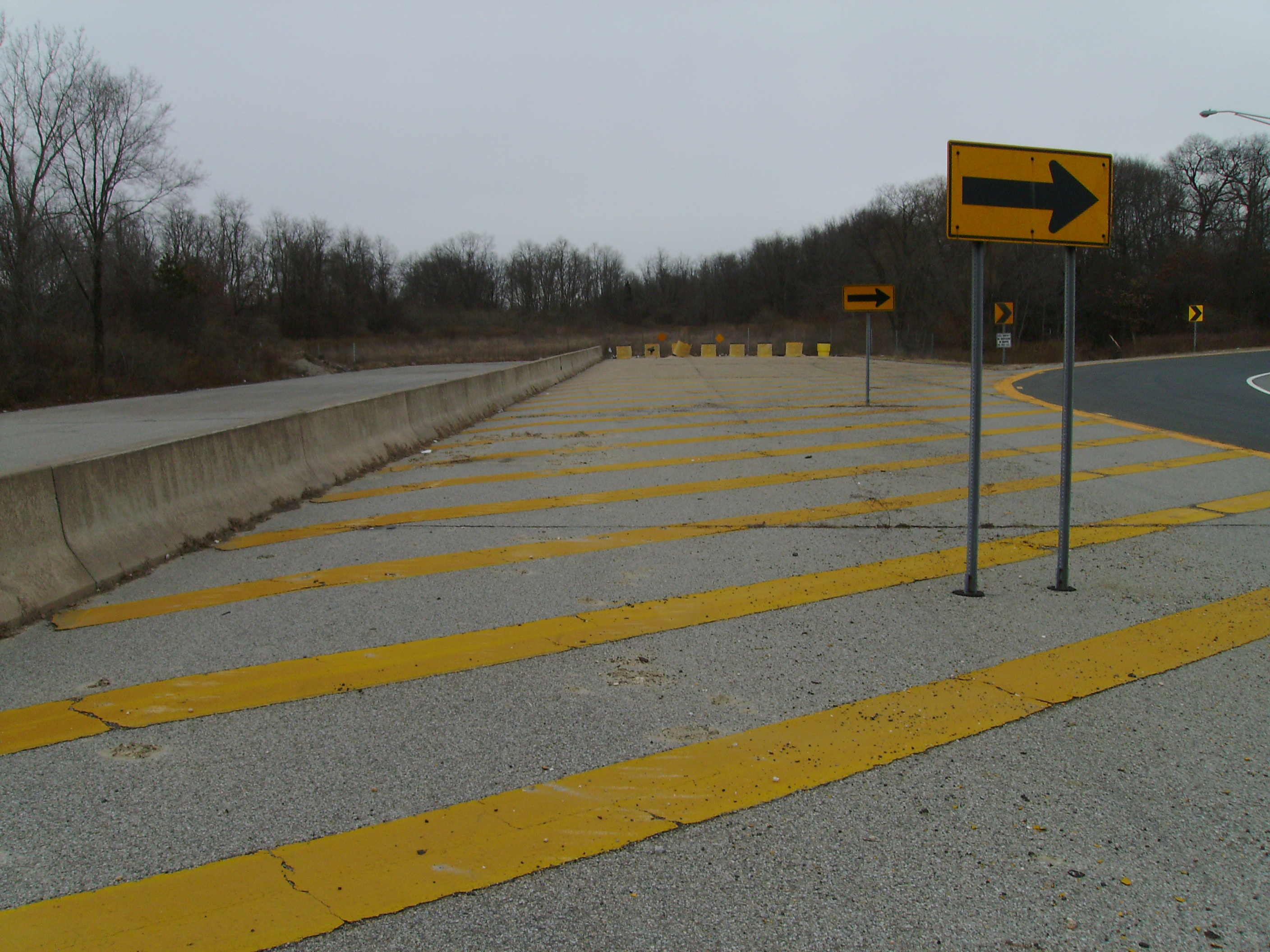
North stub end of the expressway

=== Setbacks ===
On March 1, 1968, the Triborough Bridge and Tunnel Authority merged with the Metropolitan Transportation Authority (MTA), and Moses was removed from his role as chairman. He was retained as a consultant only because he would have a leading role in construction of the bridge. A number of excuses for delaying construction of the bridge were coming from the governor's offices. In 1969, the office said that the bond market, which would help finance the bridge, was too soft. The next year, there was a gubernatorial election for Rockefeller, and with the affected communities up in arms against him, he did not want to be put on the spot while running for re-election as governor.

In 1971, financial problems resurfaced on the proposed bridge and delayed it yet another year. The following year, the campaign for the Republican-controlled legislature in New York and governor were yet another reason to delay construction. With each delay, Moses continued to insist that the bridge would begin construction the next year.

In 1970, Governor Rockefeller ordered another feasibility study, costing about $160,000. That same year, new federal laws that dealt with the environment required a new Environmental Impact Statement for the highway, this time for the approaches as well.

=== Oyster Bay to Rye Bridge ===
With the mainline construction of the Seaford – Oyster Bay Expressway completed, Moses turned his eyes back onto an extension of the freeway and onto a bridge across the Long Island Sound into Westchester County (in the city of Rye). The idea, produced by Moses, was to extend the freeway northward past its current terminus, and along its previously proposed right-of-way past NY 106. Based on the Nassau County Department of Public Works Master Plan of 1959, the expressway would follow West Shore Road and Lundlum Avenue through Oyster Bay to Bayville, where it would connect to the new crossing.

In November 1972, Moses, the recently created New York State Department of Transportation, and the MTA submitted the environmental impact statement (EIS) for the bridge. The statement specified that the project was to include the approaches to the bridge (I-287 and NY 135) and be a 16.5-mile (26.6 km) project, as that was the distance from the interchange of I-287 and I-95 in Rye to the interchange of NY 135 and NY 25 in Syosset. The statement also explained how the highway would become an extended part of I-287. The bridge was to be constructed with four lanes, about 135 feet (41 m) above the sound at maximum clearances and 55 feet (17 m) on the minimum clearances. There would be 1,200 feet (370 m) of a center between the two towers along the cable span. These minimums reported by the two authorities and Moses were equal to those of the bridges crossing the East River in New York City. The main span would have a median divider separating the directional lanes, along with a girder box to allow for smooth passing.

In Westchester County, there were four proposed alternatives to the approach of the bridge. The first three proposals, designated W-1, W-2, and W-3, would use the undeveloped area around Playland Park in Rye for the approach. Proposals W-1 and W-2 would use Kirby Lane and Forest Avenue and be on a low-viaduct structure. Proposal W-3 would follow a narrow piece of land between Kirby Pond and the water between Manursing Island. W-4 was to go through Port Chester Harbor and head across the Sound near North Manursing Island. The approaches were to have retaining walls, side slopes, and screening which were to help blend in with the area and reduce the number of properties seized.

Across the Sound in Nassau County, three alternatives were considered for the bridge approach. The first, designated N-1, went from Oak Neck Point southward to an underpass of Bayville Avenue and into a deep cut of about 40 feet (12 m) near Mill Neck Creek. The cuts were to be built so they would be hidden from local properties. From there it would follow West Shore Road into Oyster Bay and utilize NY 106 to get onto the expressway extension. The second alternative, designated N-2, utilized most of N-1's route except for a cut through Mill Neck and onto a viaduct about 2,000 feet (610 m) long with varying clearances. After Mill Neck, it would follow the alignment of proposal N-1. N-3 was significantly different from the other two proposed and would use a longer bridge over the Sound, touching down in Ferry Beach rather than Bayville. The route would then pass to the east of the business district in Bayville and cross over the Mill Neck Creek on a viaduct with a 30 feet (9.1 m) clearance. Alternatives N-1 and N-2 were a bit more than 4 miles (6 km) long, and alternative N-3 was a little more than 3 miles (5 km) long.

On the Nassau side, full cloverleaf interchanges would have been built at NY 106 and NY 25A (North Hempstead Turnpike), and ramps to and from Bayville Avenue were proposed to be used for southbound traffic. This would allow local residents to use the approach route but not have to use local roads in the process. The total costs for the entire project were $200 million for the bridge itself and $52–72 million on the approaches, depending on which route was selected. Another $25 million would have gone toward the completion of NY 135 between NY 25 (the Jericho Turnpike) and NY 106.

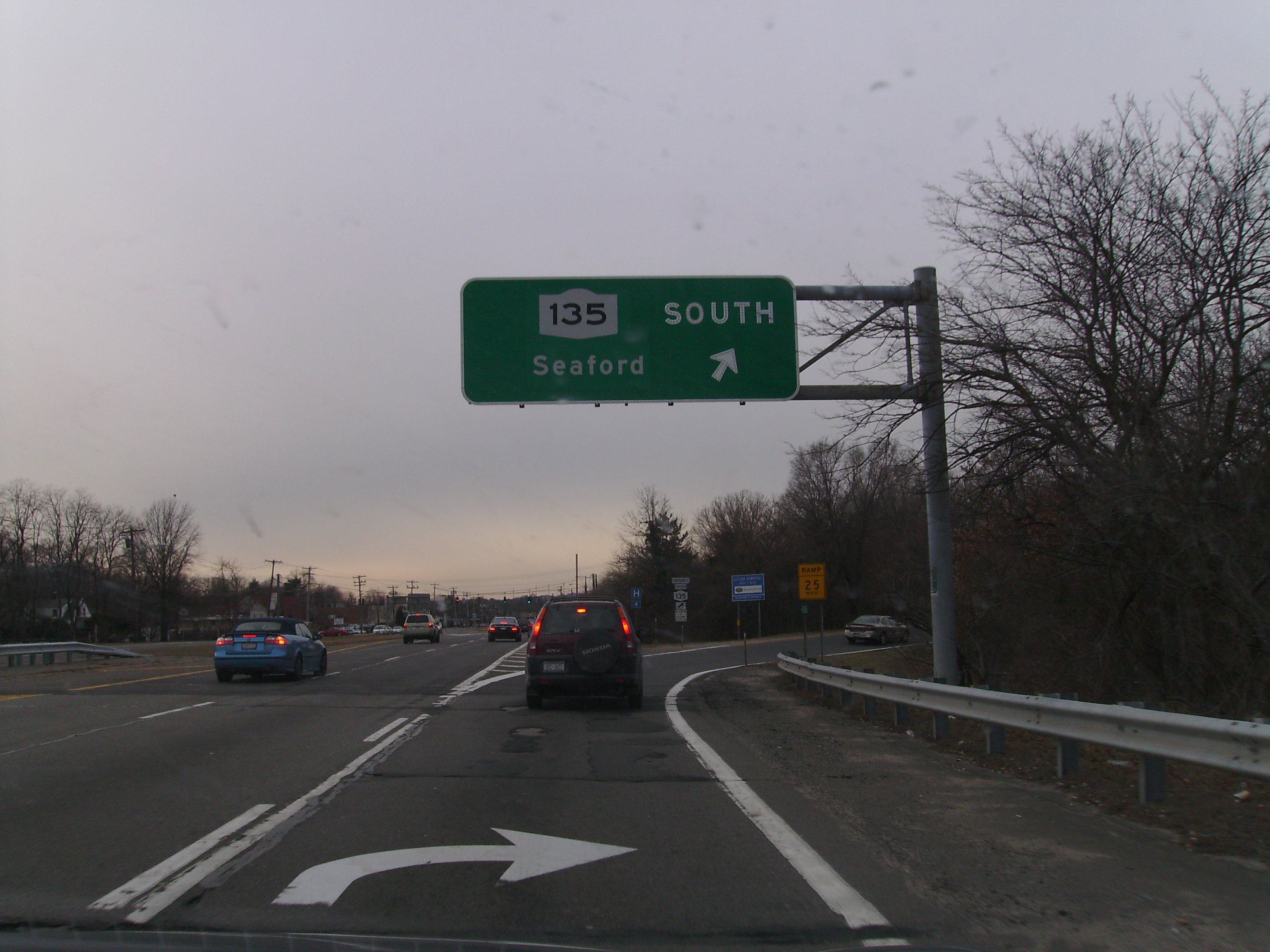
NY 135 sign on NY 25 eastbound

=== Benefits ===
It was believed that the bridge would have positive effects on both traffic and the local economy, as I-95 (the New England Thruway) would lose some of its congestion as traffic would be diverted onto the new bridge from Long Island rather than through New York City and on the East River bridges. This would also help the traffic flow from I-95 onto the Cross Westchester and raise the number of turning movements in the area. Similarly, the Hutchinson River Parkway would benefit from the diversion of traffic onto the bridge. The economic effects would be substantial, with a projected 11.8 million people using the bridge in the first year alone. By the fifth year, the proposed traffic volume was 16 million, and by its twentieth year in existence, 23 million people would use the bridge. The tolls, $1.75 for passenger cars and a significantly higher toll for commercial vehicles, would lead to a $21.5 million increase in revenue in the first year and an increase of $43 million by the twentieth year.

Other than monetary benefits, there were also to be economic benefits:

A wider regional market will be available to business enterprises on both sides of the Sound, thereby creating more favorable conditions for establishment of new businesses and expansion of older ones. This applies particularly to specialized enterprises serving areas broader than individual localities.

Employment opportunities will be broader for residents on both sides of the Sound. Individuals with special skills will have a wider field in which to locate, and there will be more opportunity to match skills with jobs. As a result, income levels will often rise as people will be more able to utilize their maximum abilities. The need to relocate families in order to gain better access to employment will be diminished.

Because the bridge will contribute to a healthy economic development of the region, it will have a favorable general effect on property values and therefore on the tax base. Consequently, it will tend to hold down tax rates. These favorable impacts may have been the experience of many transportation improvements.

Movement of goods will be an important function of the new bridge. For the first time, highway access will be available for freight movements to and from Long Island without the need to overcome New York City congestion. Freight shipments to Long Island are now charged at a premium rate. Construction of the bridge could result in a reduction in rates for Long Island shippers and receivers, with a possible favorable effect on the cost of living as well as on the costs of doing business.

Construction of a major project of the magnitude of the proposed bridge and its approach highways will provide a substantial number of jobs during the period it is under construction. Approximately 55 percent of the total cost of construction will be for labor, of which the major element will be on-site. It is estimated that approximately 6,400 man-hours of work will be required, spaced over a three-year period. This means an average of about 2,100 men working on the project, with a peak force of perhaps 3,000 workers. In addition to the labor employed directly on contract work, both on-site and off-site, there will also be employment created in the furnishing of materials, supplies and services required for the project. Secondary economic benefits also will be realized from expenditures by workers employed on the project, both in the vicinity of the bridge site and elsewhere in the region. All of this economic activity will produce substantial additional income for the region, most of it without requiring additional permanent community services.

— Robert Moses, NYSDOT and MTA, Oyster Bay – Rye Bridge Economic Impact Statement (1973)

=== Opposition ===
Moses ran into a problem once the proposal was brought to the Federal Highway Administration. Opposition to the bridge was beginning to form on both sides of Long Island Sound. In addition, plans to turn the Oyster Bay area into a bird sanctuary and a protected park made working on the highway harder, as building on such protected places is forbidden by law. Faced with growing opposition, Governor Rockefeller canceled the plans for the bridge on June 20, 1973, nine years after the first proposal by Moses.

=== 21st century ===
In January 2008, this idea was revived when developer Vincent Polimeni proposed building a privately financed, tolled tunnel between Oyster Bay on Long Island and Rye in Westchester County, featuring two tubes carrying three lanes of traffic each and a third tube for maintenance and emergency access. The route would connect Route 135 (Seaford-Oyster Bay Expressway) on Long Island to Interstate 287 in Westchester County. It would cost between $12 and $16 billion and would not be completed until at least 2025. The proposed tunnel would be 16 to 18 miles (26 to 29 km) long, making it the world's longest highway tunnel, longer than the Lærdal Tunnel in Norway. A hearing on this proposal was held in Syosset on January 24, 2008.

During his second term, New York Governor Andrew Cuomo also proposed a tunnel connecting NY 135 to Rye. This is also a highway in two tubes and a third tube for maintenance. After a polarizing debate, the NYSDOT released a statement saying the tunnel would not be moving forward at this time.

== List of proposals ==
=== Proposals by year ===
The idea for a bridge dates back to the 1930s, but most studies were done in the 1960s and 1970s. Details can be found at the cited reference.

- 1938 – U.S. Senator Royal Copeland proposed the construction of an 18-mile bridge from Orient Point, New York, to Connecticut or Rhode Island.
- 1957 – Charles H. Sells proposed Oyster Bay to Rye Bridge and Orient Point to Watch Hill Bridge
- 1965 – Bertram D. Tallamy Associates performed a study for the New York State Department of Public Works.
- 1966 – New York Governor Nelson Rockefeller began a concerted effort to build a bridge across the Sound.
- 1971 – Creighton, Hamburg, Incorporated studied eight bridge proposals for the NYSDOT.
- 1979 – New York Governor Hugh Carey set up a tri-state advisory committee to study building a bridge across the Sound.
- 2001 – Robert Wiemer proposed a tunnel to link Oyster Bay and Rye.
- 2007 – Long Island based entrepreneurs Vincent Polimeni and his son Michael, engineers Hatch Mott MacDonald, bankers Bear Stearns, and Rubenstein Assoc PR people proposed a tunnel between Oyster Bay and Rye.
- 2018 – Governor Andrew M. Cuomo proposed a NY 135 to Rye tunnel.
- 2021 – North Atlantic Rail proposes a tunnel from Port Jefferson, New York to Milford, Connecticut as part of a new high-speed main line between New York City and Boston.
- 2025 - CT Real Estate Developer Stephen Shapiro proposes 14 mile bridge from Sunken Meadow Parkway to Bridgeport, CT.

=== Proposals by location ===
Proposals for the Sound link are listed below from west to east.

Southern point	Northern point	Length	Bridge or tunnel	Estimated cost	Year proposed
Sands Point	New Rochelle	3.3 miles (5.3 km)	Bridge	$132 million	1971
Glen Cove	Rye	4.6 miles (7.4 km)	Bridge	$150 million	1971
Oyster Bay	Rye	6.1 miles (9.8 km)	Bridge	$168 million	1971
Oyster Bay	Rye	6.1 miles (9.8 km)	Tunnel		2001
Oyster Bay	Rye	16 miles (26 km)	Tunnel	$8 to $10 billion	2007
Northport	Norwalk		Bridge		Before 1971
Syosset	Noroton-Norwalk		Tunnel		2001
Port Jefferson	Bridgeport	14.5 miles (23.3 km)	Bridge	$219 million $368 million	1965; 1968
Shoreham	New Haven	24.0 miles (38.6 km)	Bridge	$565 million $1.4 billion	1971; 1979
Wading River	East Haven		Bridge		1979
Riverhead	Guilford	20.1 miles (32.3 km)	Bridge	$510 million $720 million	1971; 1979
East Marion	Old Saybrook	10 miles (16 km)	Bridge	$206 million $390 million $640 million	1965; 1971; 1979
Orient Point	East Lyme		Tunnel		1966
Orient Point	Watch Hill	15.4 miles (24.8 km)	Bridge	$392 million $639 million	1965; 1971
Orient Point	Groton and Watch Hill	23.8 miles (38.3 km)	Bridge	$260 million	1963
