= Great Captain Island Light =

Lighthouse in Connecticut, United States

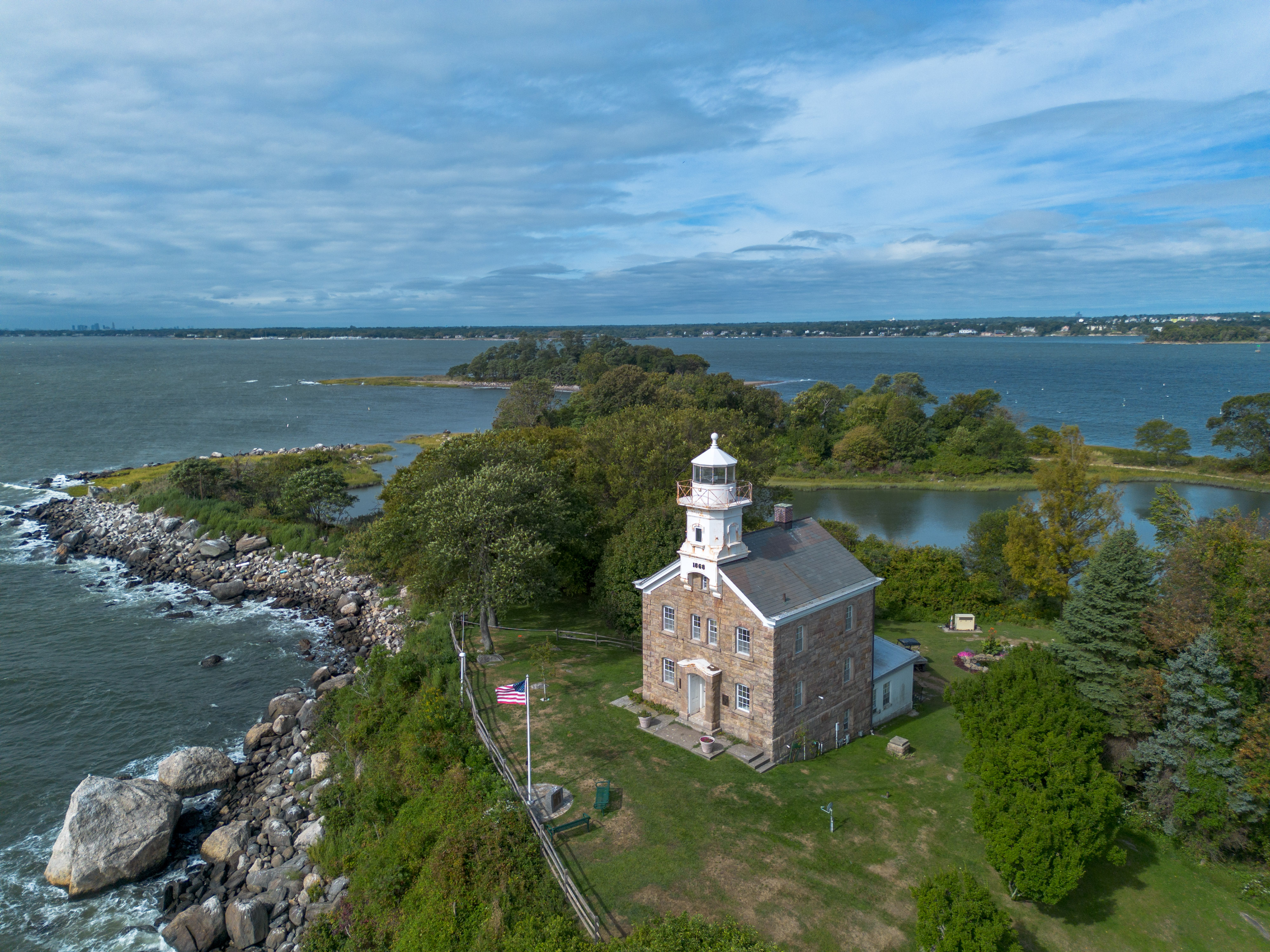
- The light in 2025
- Location: Great Captain Island, Greenwich, United States
- Coordinates: 40°58′57″N 73°37′25″W

Tower
- Constructed: 1868
- Construction: granite (tower), wood, cast iron (lantern), stone (basement)
- Height: 51 ft (16 m)
- Shape: octagonal tower with balcony and lantern
- Operator: Town of Greenwich
- Heritage: National Register of Historic Places listed place

Light
- Deactivated: 1970
- Focal height: 51 ft (16 m)
- Lens: Fourth order Fresnel lens
- Characteristic: Fl G 5s (–Unknown)
- Great Captain Island Light
- U.S. National Register of Historic Places
- Nearest city: Greenwich, Connecticut
- NRHP reference No.: 91000351
- Added to NRHP: April 3, 1991
- Original light
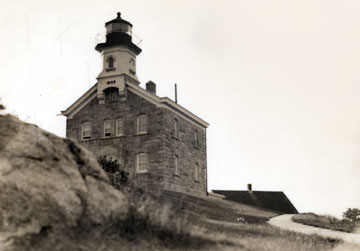
- Constructed: 1829
- Construction: stone
- Height: 30 ft (9.1 m)
- First lit: 1830
- Deactivated: 1868
- Characteristic: F W (1858–)
- Current light
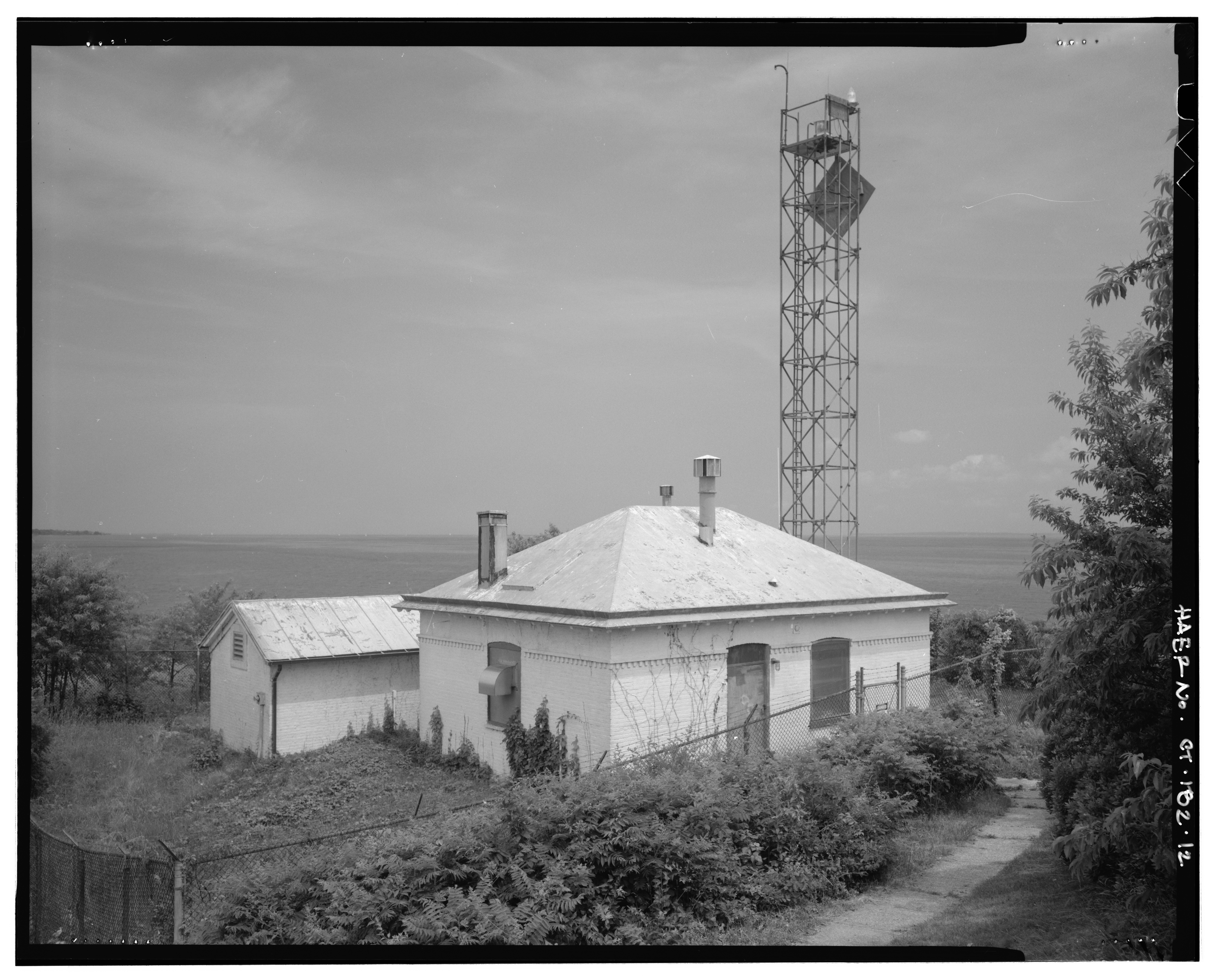
- Constructed: 1970
- Construction: metal
- Height: 62 ft (19 m)
- Shape: square
- First lit: 1970
- Focal height: 62 ft (19 m)
- Lens: FA-251 optic
- Characteristic: Fl WR 6s

Great Captain Island Lighthouse is a lighthouse on Great Captain Island in the western Long Island Sound off the coast of Greenwich, Connecticut, United States. Built in 1829, the first lighthouse, made of stone, was of such poor construction that the walls were severely cracked a decade later. In 1868, a new granite dwelling with attached lantern was completed. The lighthouse is of the same design as lighthouses at Sheffield Island in Norwalk; Morgan Point in Noank; Old Field Point Light and Plum Island in New York; and Block Island North in Rhode Island. In 1890, a fog whistle was added, in 1905 a siren was installed. The lighthouse was deactivated in 1970 when a skeletal tower replaced it. The Town of Greenwich acquired the property in 1973 and had full-time caretakers on the site until the lighthouse became too dilapidated in 2003. A successful restoration effort was completed in 2009 and a non-navigational light was activated in 2012. In 2010, a memorial plaque was installed to "honor the 23 people who lived in Greenwich, or had a connection to the town", who died in the September 11, 2001 attacks. In 1991, the Great Captain Island Light was added to the National Register of Historic Places.

== First lighthouse ==
In 1829, the federal government purchased 3.5 acres of land on the southeast part of Great Captain Island from Samuel Lyons, prior to the site being selected for a lighthouse. The other contending site, Stamford Point, became the subject of a 50-year-long dispute between Connecticut and New York over its ownership, Connecticut eventually prevailed. Completed in 1829, the 30-foot (9.1 m) stone lighthouse was built by Charles H. Smith for $3455.17 and it had a five-room keeper's house. By 1838, it was clear the construction was of poor quality and the walls were cracking. However, the structure remained in use until the new tower was completed in 1868. The original light was composed of 10 lamps with reflectors, but it was upgraded to a fourth Fresnel lens in 1858. As a result of the new installation, the light changed to a fixed white light.

== Second lighthouse ==
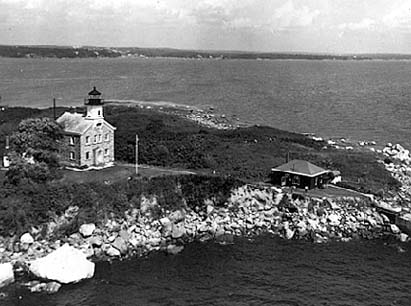
Great Captain Island Lighthouse (U.S. Coast Guard photograph)

In 1867, it was determined a new tower needed to be built and the new structure was completed in 1868. The new lighthouse was a keeper's quarters with an attached lantern on the roof. The structure is of the same design as lighthouses at Sheffield Island in Norwalk; Morgan Point in Noank; Old Field Point Light and Plum Island in New York; and Block Island North in Rhode Island. The dwelling is made of granite and the lantern made of cast iron. The original Fresnel lens was installed in the new tower. In 1890, a fog whistle was installed and it would be replaced by a siren in 1905. The siren caused much distress to nearby residents and had to be modified.

=== Renovation ===
In the late 1990s, the Greenwich Chamber of Commerce started a campaign in the late 1990s to relight the lighthouse. It was assisted by the Indian Harbor Yacht Club. It suffered a setback as one of the fundraiser's original members, Bennett Fisher, died in the September 11, 2001 attacks. In May 2007, the government approved a $1 million appropriation for the restoration work. In the 1990s, a nonprofit group called Return the Light was formed and raised $305,000 for restoration work – most of it donated in the memory of Bennett Fisher. Carl White notes that "the non-profit was able to raise $305,000, and with Federal Funds, $1.13 million was obtained for the project".

In 2008, a total of $1.2 million was budgeted for the restoration project. Restoration plans called for a new beacon and restoration of the caretaker's quarters. A memorial walkway, garden and plaque would honor victims of the September 11, 2001, terrorist attacks. Interior work on the lighthouse was scheduled for April through July, with no exterior work during that time in order not to disturb breeding herons and egrets. The project was scheduled for completion in 2009. The restoration concerned some conservations because the work could disturb nesting herons and egrets. Tom Baptist, executive director of Audubon Connecticut and a Greenwich resident, said he supports the renovation work together with measures to protect the birds. In 2010, a September 11 memorial plaque was installed to "honor the 23 people who lived in Greenwich, or had a connection to the town", who died in the September 11 attacks". A non-navigational 4-second flashing green light was installed in the lighthouse on February 13, 2012. White writes that the light serves as a "tribute to the lighthouses and lighthouse keepers who were dedicated to saving lives on the Sound".

== Current lighthouse ==
In 1970, a freestanding skeleton tower replaced the light and the vacant lighthouse was soon vandalized. In 1973, the town of Greenwich acquired the lighthouse and had full-time caretakers living in the light until 2003. A caretaker continued to live in the old lighthouse until 2003, when it became too dilapidated. In 1991, it was added to the National Register of Historic Places.

== Access ==
A single dirt road leads to the lighthouse on the eastern side of the island, where most of the island's egrets tend to nest. The Greenwich Department of Parks and Recreation oversees the island. No public tours of the lighthouse or island are available, but the lighthouse is the residence of caretakers.

== List of keepers ==
This list includes known keepers, but excludes assistants and non-officers of the Coast Guard.

Name	Year	Service Notes
John W. Smith	1830–1834	
James Merritt	1834–unknown	
James Bride	1839–1848	
Benjamin Merritt	1848–1849	
George W. Anderson	1849–unknown	
Charles McIntosh	Unknown	
Alexander Worden	1856–1858	
Gilbert Horton	1858–1861	
James Merritt	1861–1863	
James Travis	1863–1864	Full name unknown
George Lusk	1864	
James McCulloch	1864–1871	
Eliakim F. Worden	1871–1890	
Eugene Mulligan	1890–c. 1907	
John Nelson	1916	
Adam L. Kohlman	late 1920s – circa 1944	
Laureat LeClerc	Circa 1930s	
Frank B. Abel	1969	Coast Guard Officer in Charge

== See also ==
- List of lighthouses in Connecticut
- List of lighthouses in the United States
- National Register of Historic Places listings in Greenwich, Connecticut
