= Peak ornament =

A peak ornament is a decorative element which may be located under the peak of eaves of a gabled building, comparable to the related finial, which instead projects straight up from the roof ridge at the gable's apex as a vertical decorative "punctuation mark". Both elements are common features of ornate Victorian-era gable treatments.

For example, peak ornaments are notable features in some of the historic houses of the Noank Historic District, in the town of Groton, Connecticut.

The peak ornament is an architectural element in architecture.

== See also ==
- Bargeboard
- Classical architecture
- Glossary of architecture
