= Constance II =

Constance II may refer to:

- Anna of Hohenstaufen (1230–1307), Empress Consort of Nicaea (ca. 1241–1254), sometimes referred to as Constance II of Hohenstaufen
- Constance II of Sicily
- USS Constance II (SP-633), later USS YP-633, a United States Navy patrol boat in commission from 1917 to 1922
