= Old Field Point Light =

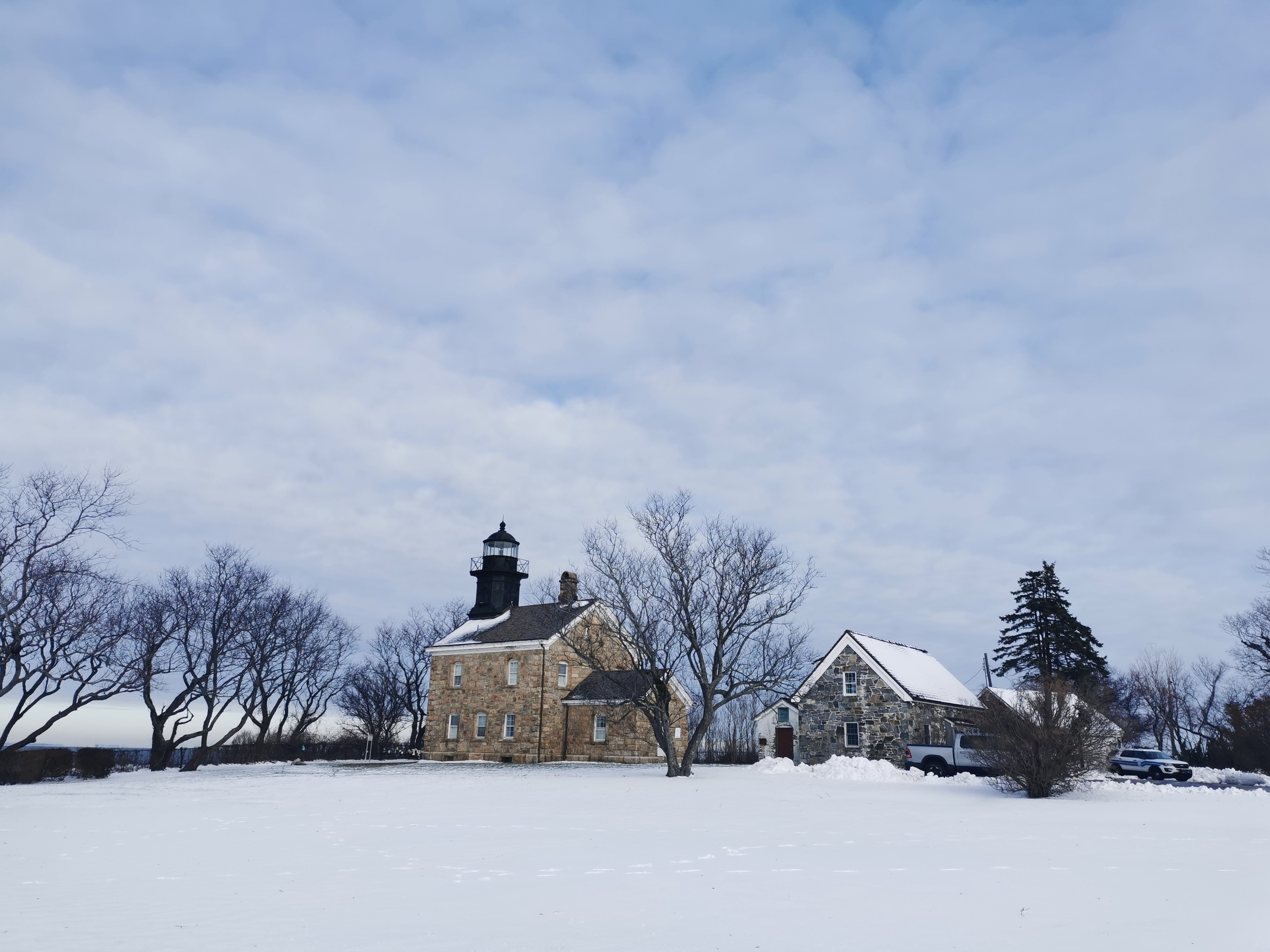
- Location: Old Field, New York, Long Island north shore
- Coordinates: 40°58′37.2″N 73°07′06.9″W

Tower
- Constructed: 1823
- Foundation: Stone
- Construction: Wood tower on granite house
- Automated: 1991
- Height: 74 feet (23 m) from sea level
- Shape: Octagonal Tower. Black. Originally white with black lantern.

Light
- First lit: 1869 (Current tower)
- Deactivated: 1933-1991
- Focal height: 23 m (75 ft)
- Lens: Fourth order Fresnel lens (original), "Modern Beacon" (current)
- Range: 14 nautical miles (26 km; 16 mi)
- Characteristic: Alternating Red and Green 24 s. Red Flash 12, Green Flash 12 s.

Old Field Point Light is a lighthouse within the village of Old Field, New York between the entrances to Port Jefferson Harbor and Stony Brook Harbor on the North Shore of Long Island. The light was listed on the National Register of Historic Places in 2024.

== Description ==
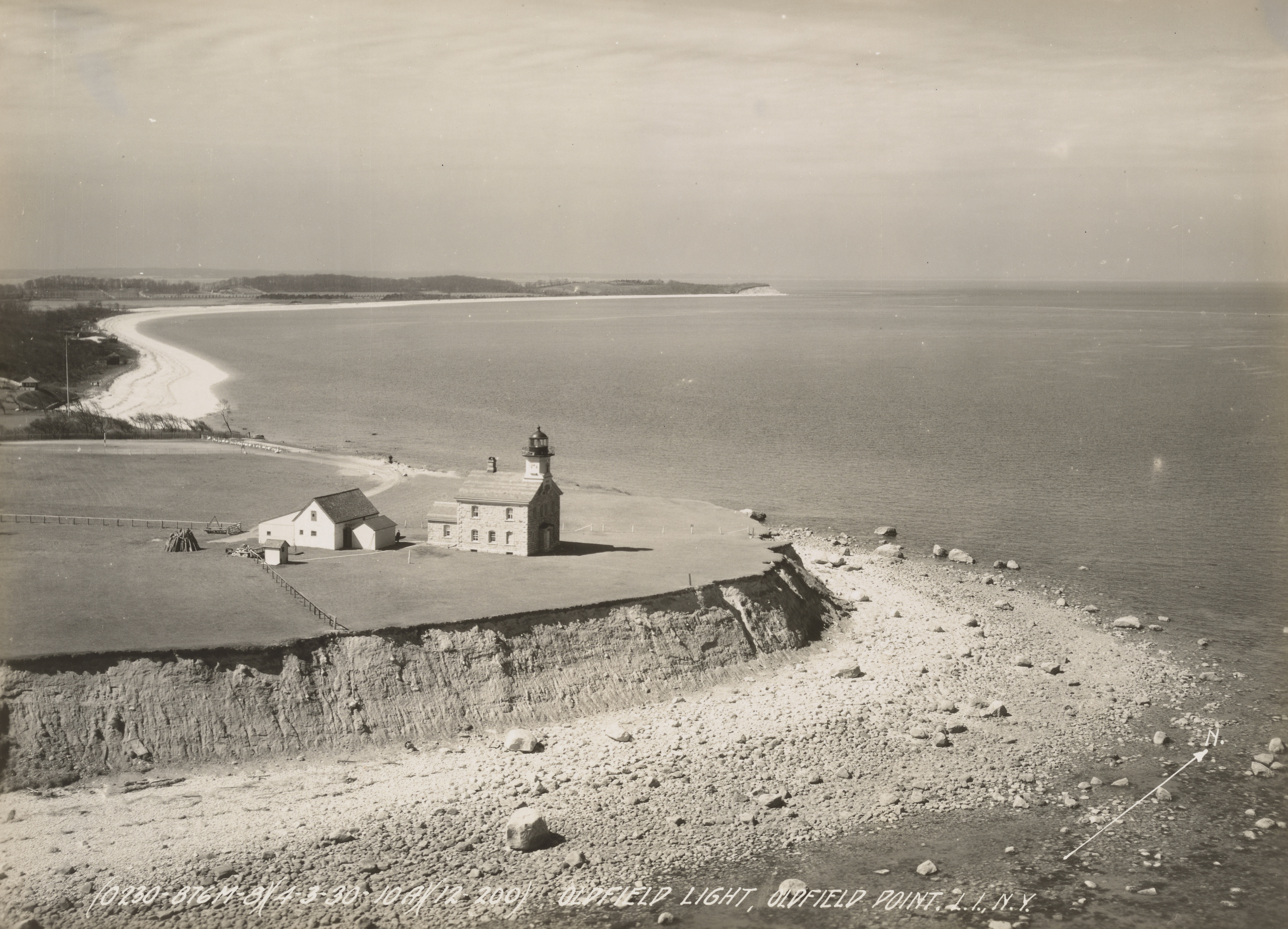
Old Field Point in 1930

The Old Field Point Light located on the northern tip of Old Field, dates back to 1823. It was built by the United States government for $2,500. The rest of the lighthouse was finished in 1824 for an additional $1,500.

The first light came from nine whale oil lamps and was magnified by a large glass reflector.

In 1868, a new lighthouse was built, with kerosene lamps. In 1933, an automatic revolving light was installed. When the lighthouse was in use, the caretaker used the Old Field village hall as a home.

The U.S. government gave it back to Old Field in 1935, with the proviso that the government can take it back in case of a national emergency. It was taken back during World War II by the U.S. Coast Guard, but after the war they gave it back to the Old Field community. The Old Field light shines on New York's Long Island Sound.

The structure is of the same design as lighthouses at Sheffield Island in Norwalk, Connecticut; Morgan Point in Noank, Connecticut; Great Captain Island in Greenwich, Connecticut, Plum Island on Plum Island in New York; and Block Island North on Block Island in Rhode Island.

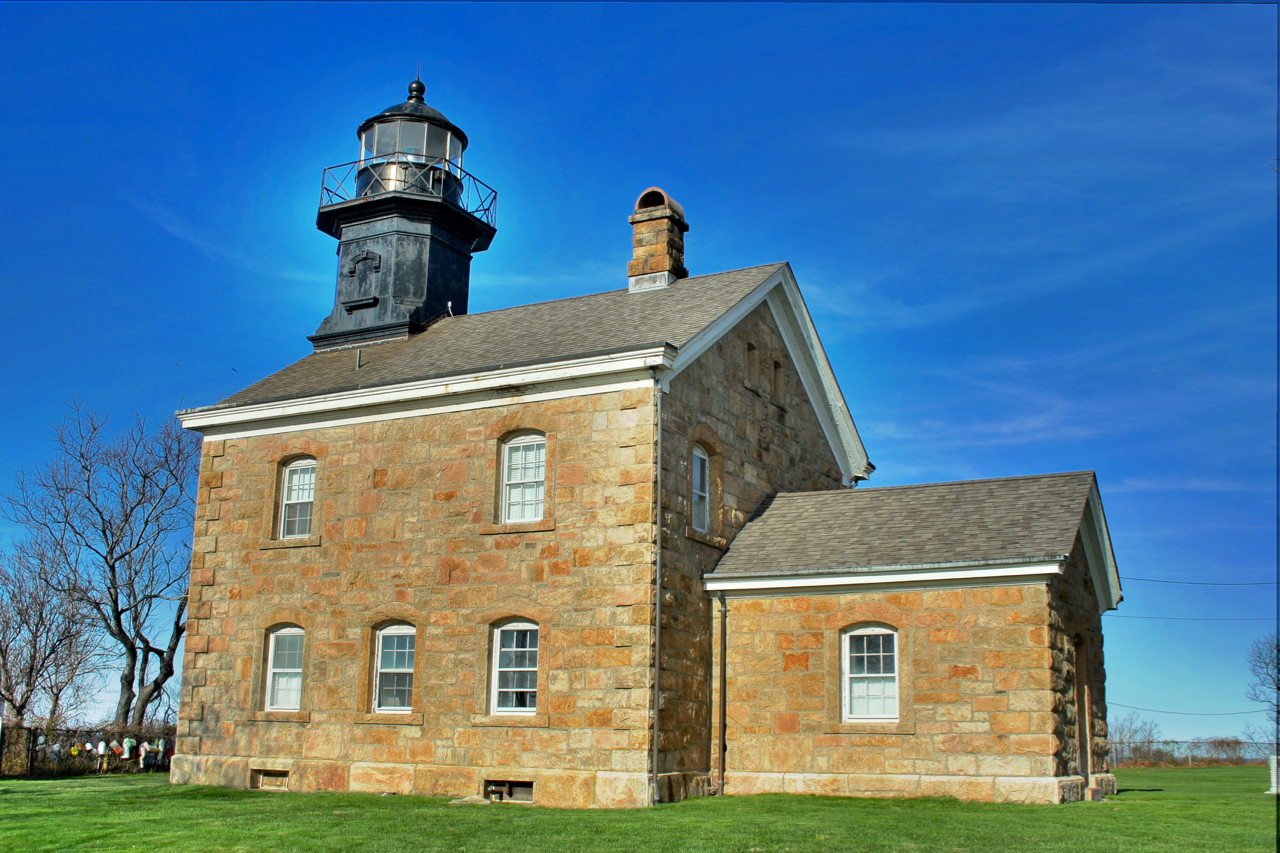
Old Field Point Light in 2015

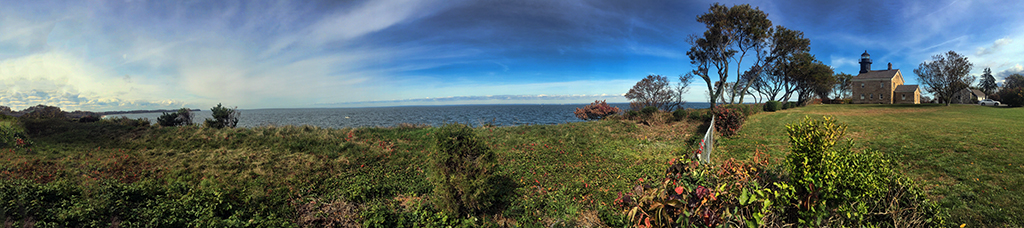
Old Field Point Light Panorama

== Cultural ==
The Archives Center at the Smithsonian National Museum of American History has a collection (#1055) of souvenir postcards of lighthouses and has digitized 272 of these and made them available online. These include postcards of Old Field Point Light with links to customized nautical charts provided by National Oceanographic and Atmospheric Administration.
