= Noank Historic District =

Historic district in Connecticut, United States

- U.S. National Register of Historic Places
- U.S. Historic district
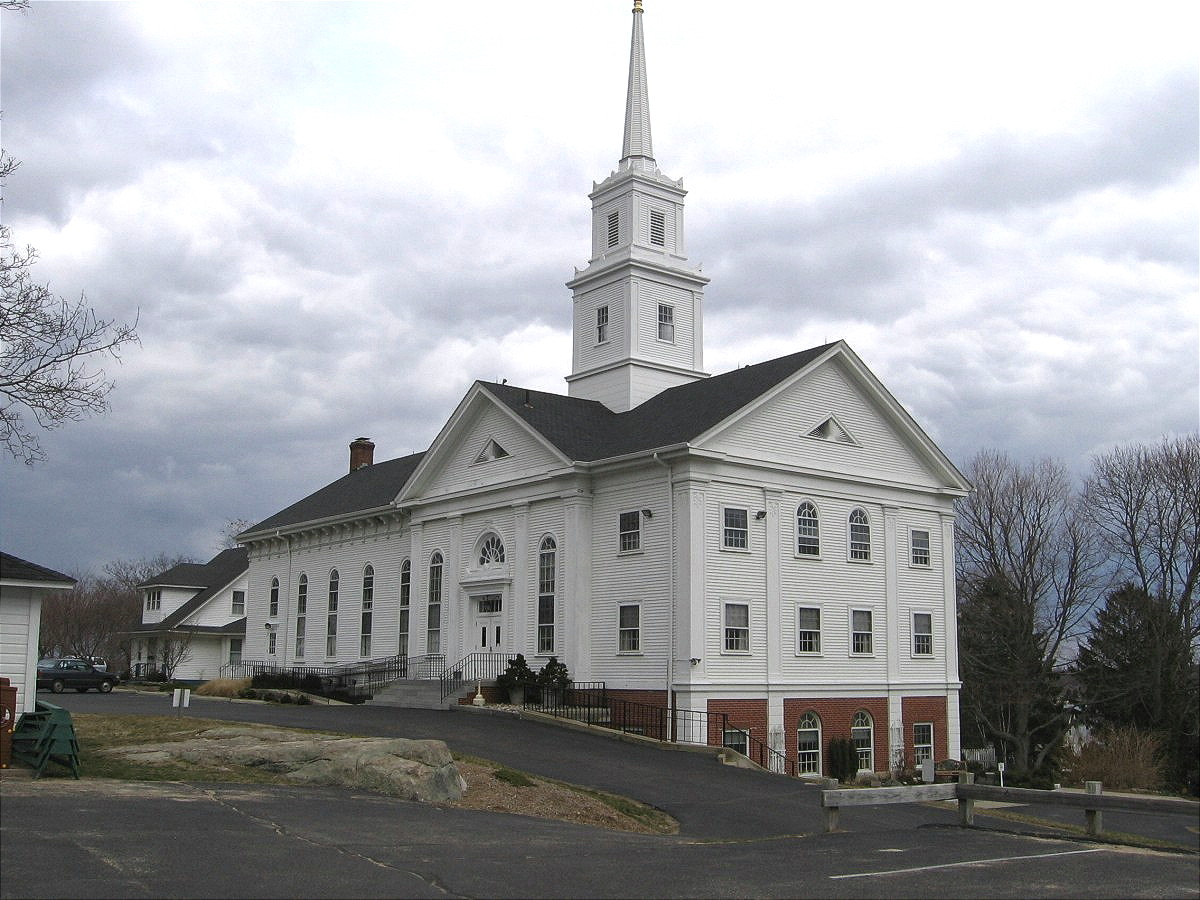
- Noank Baptist Church

- Location within Connecticut Location within the United States
- Location: Main Street, Groton, Connecticut
- Coordinates: 41°19′28″N 71°59′20″W
- Area: 140 acres (57 ha)
- Built: 1840
- Architect: Multiple
- Architectural style: Greek Revival, Gothic, Stick-Eastlake
- NRHP reference No.: 79002656
- Added to NRHP: August 10, 1979

The Noank Historic District is a historic district encompassing the historic main part of the village of Noank in the town of Groton, Connecticut. The district contains a distinctive assortment of mid-to-late 19th-century residential architecture that is notable for its often picturesque woodwork. At the time of their construction, the village was primarily a worker village for nearby shipyards. The district was listed on the National Register of Historic Places in 1979.

== Description and history ==
The district boundaries includes almost all of what is known as Noank, which occupies a peninsula on the west side of the bay at the mouth of the Mystic River. It includes Elm Street, Prospect Hill Road, and Noank Peninsula east of Route 215, but it excludes certain areas. The nearby Goat Island was excluded from the district, because all early buildings were destroyed by the New England Hurricane of 1938, and various streets near Elm are lined with modern houses that significantly postdate the district. Its streets are mainly winding residential lanes, with a cluster of commercial and institutional buildings at Main and Pearl Streets.

Most prominent is the Baptist church, located at the high point on the peninsula. It is an Italianate structure that was constructed in 1867; it originally featured twin towers, although they were swept away in 1938. Another important feature is the Noank Shipyard, at the location of the historic Palmer Shipyard, which was one of the village's primary employers in the 19th century. One significant industrial building is a former velvet mill built in 1905, which also was used by the state as a lobster hatchery. The building was used for a time by the University of Connecticut Marine Research Station.

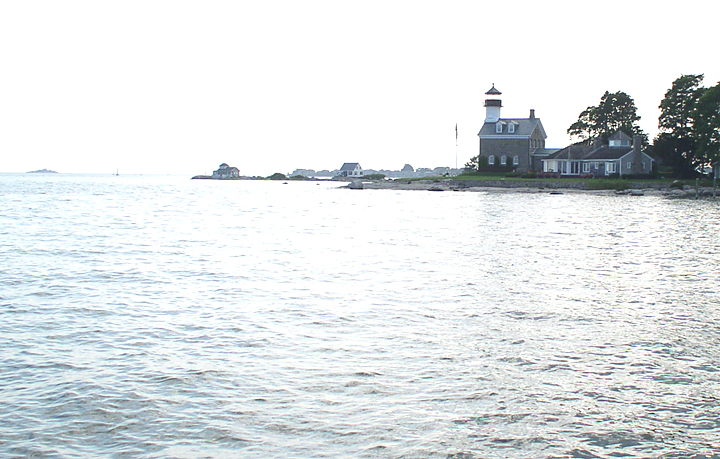
Lighthouse, at end of peninsula

Other contributing properties include:

- St. Joseph's Catholic Church, 78 Front Street, shingled and with Gothic details
- A Gothic Methodist church with Art Nouveau windows, which as of 1978 was re-used as apartments
- A cobblestone Episcopal Church, used as a museum by 1978, and one of few non-wooden buildings in the community
- Morgan's Point Lighthouse, an 1868 granite ashlar building with an octagonal tower,

There are about 260 houses in the district; their significance was the primary reason for the district's designation. Many of the houses are built with a variety of Greek Revival, Gothic, and Eastlake features, which present a consistent 19th appearance by means of elements such as porches, fences, and pilasters.

== See also ==
- National Register of Historic Places listings in New London County, Connecticut
