= Extreme points of New England =

This is a list of extreme points of New England, which are points that extend farther north, south, east, or west than any other part of New England. There is also the highest point, lowest point, and geographic center.

Distinction	Location	Coordinates
Northernmost point	Estcourt Station, Maine, opposite Pohénégamook, Quebec	47°28′N 69°13′W
Southernmost point	Great Captain Island, Connecticut	40°59′N 73°37′W
Westernmost point	In Greenwich, Connecticut, approximately 1 mile west of I-684, in Fairfield County (near the intersection of High Hill Road and King Street)	41°6′2″N 73°43′39″W
Easternmost point	West Quoddy Head, Maine (also the easternmost point of the United States mainland)	44°49′N 66°57′W
Northernmost town	Madawaska, Maine	47°18′25″N 68°14′29″W
Southernmost town	Greenwich, Connecticut	41°0′N 73°37′W
Westernmost town	Greenwich, Connecticut	41°0′N 73°37′W
Easternmost town	Lubec, Maine	44°50′N 67°1′W
Northernmost city	Caribou, Maine	46°51′49″N 67°59′53″W
Southernmost city	Stamford, Connecticut	41°03′12″N 73°32′26″W
Westernmost city	Stamford, Connecticut	41°03′12″N 73°32′26″W
Easternmost city	Eastport, Maine	44°54′49″N 67°0′14″W
Highest point	Mount Washington, New Hampshire — 6,288.2 feet (1,916.66 m) (Sargent's Purchase/Thompson and Meserve's Purchase)	44°16′13″N 71°18′12″W
Lowest point	Atlantic Ocean — sea level	
Geographic center	Dunbarton, New Hampshire	43°06′N 71°36′W

== See also ==
- Extreme points of the United States
