= Connecticut Route 215 =

State highway in New London County, Connecticut, US

Route 215
- Map of New London County in southeastern Connecticut with Route 215 highlighted in red

Route information
- Maintained by CTDOT
- Length: 4.65 mi (7.48 km)
- Existed: 1932–present

Major junctions
- West end: US 1 in Groton
- East end: US 1 in Groton

Location
- Country: United States
- State: Connecticut
- Counties: New London

Highway system
- Connecticut State Highway System; Interstate; US; State; SSR; SR; Scenic
← Route 214	→ Route 216

Route 215 is a state highway in southeastern Connecticut, running entirely within the town of Groton in a loop off US 1 through the Noank and West Mystic sections of Groton and also serves the Groton Long Point community.

== Route description ==
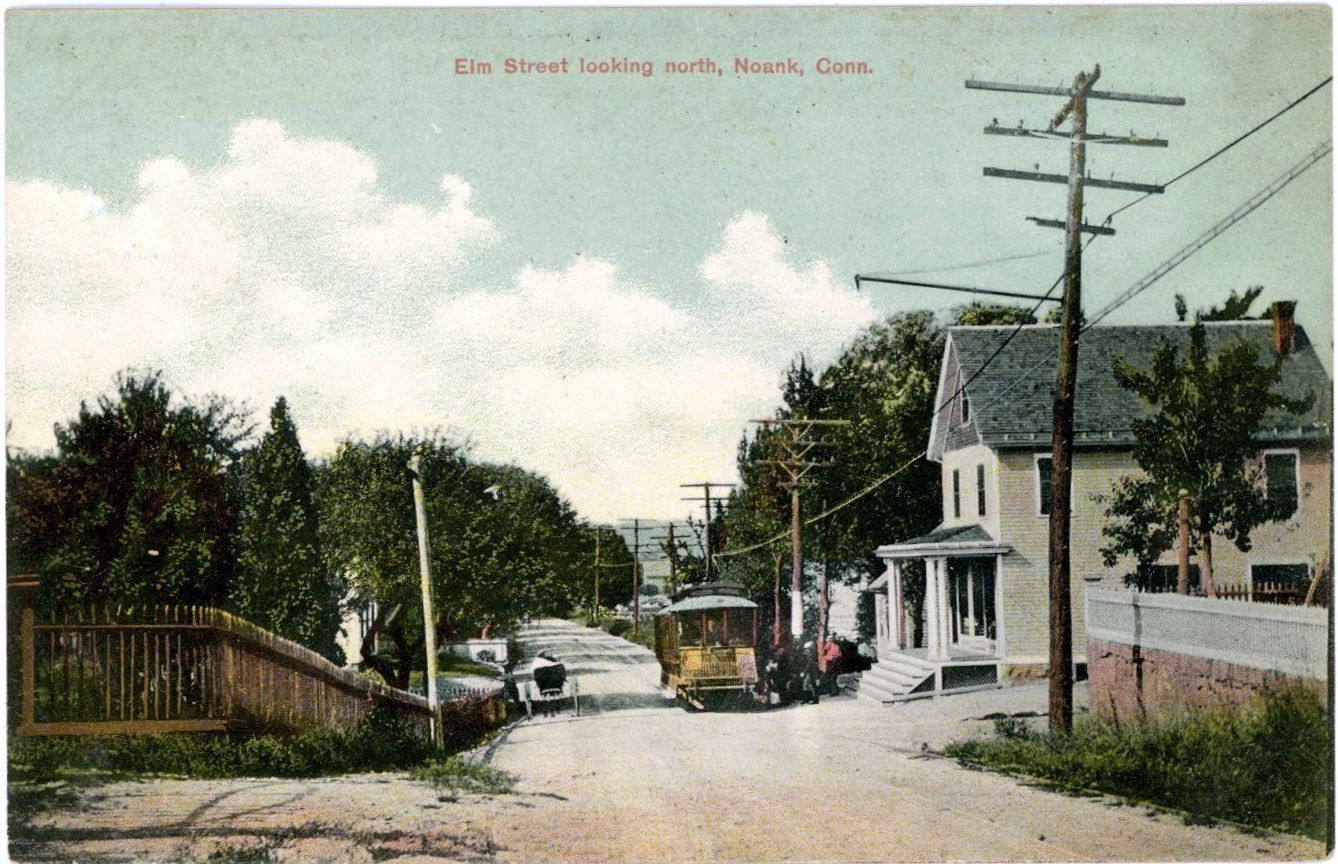
A Groton and Stonington Street Railway trolley on Elm Street in Noank around 1910

Route 215 begins as Groton Long Point Road at an intersection with US 1 in south central Groton. It heads southeast towards Noank, passing by Haley Farm State Park along the way. At the entrance to Groton Long Point, Route 215 turns east following South Elm Street into the village of Noank. After passing through the center of the village, Route 215 turns north past Beebe Cove along Elm Street then proceeds northeast following Noank Road towards West Mystic. Route 215 ends at an intersection with US 1 on the west bank of the mouth of the Mystic River near Mystic Harbor.

== History ==
In the 1920s, the road connecting Groton Long Point and Noank to West Mystic was a secondary state highway known as Highway 342. In the 1932 state highway renumbering, Route 215 was established as a new route number for old Highway 342. The newly established Route 215, like the old route, ran from Groton Long Point to US 1 along the eastern half of the modern route. The western half (old SR 670) was added in 1962 as part of the Route Reclassification Act.

== Junction list ==
The entire route is in Groton, New London County.

mi	km	Destinations	Notes
0.00	0.00	US 1 – Groton, New London, Mystic	Western terminus
4.65	7.48	US 1	Eastern terminus
1.000 mi = 1.609 km; 1.000 km = 0.621 mi
