= Flax Pond (New York) =

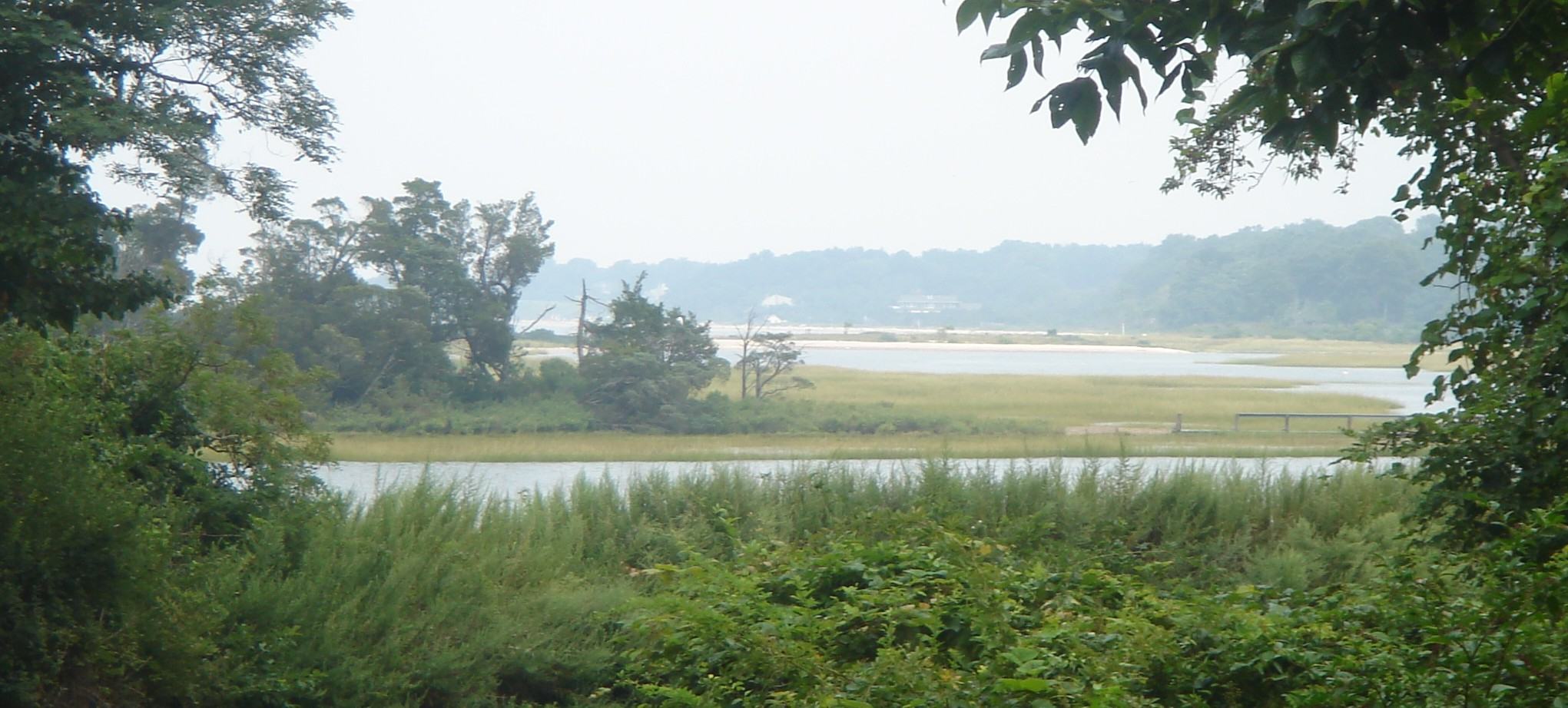
Flax Pond in August 2007.

Flax Pond is a tidal estuary located in Old Field, New York, on the north shore of Long Island. As a 146-acre (0.59 km^{2}) salt marsh, Flax Pond is a natural site of great biodiversity and natural beauty. Flax Pond is owned by the New York State Department of Environmental Conservation (NYSDEC) and is accessed by researchers at Stony Brook University as a Marine Lab for the state

In addition to research, Flax Pond also serves as a recreational beach for Long Islanders, though its location prevents many from utilizing the facility, which has served as a point of contention.

The property is located on Shore Drive in East Setauket in the Town of Brookhaven. Users can park at the Flax Pond Marine Lab. A short accessible 0.3-mile trail leads from the parking area and into the wetland, following along a boardwalk across the water.

- Flax Pond Marine Lab parking area (40.960778°N, 73.138744°W) Google Maps

All coordinates provided are in decimal degrees using NAD83/WGS84 datum.

In recent years, the management of Flax Pond has become a very important issue. The environmentally conscious group Friends of Flax Pond has used the facility to educate those in the community through lectures, workshops, and science programs. However, the NYSDEC has sought to make the Pond more accessible to residents, thus risking the environmentally pristine nature of the Pond.

State Assemblyman Steven Englebright, who has roots in geology, has repeatedly stressed the importance of Flax Pond as an environmental sanctuary. He has funded projects for Flax Pond, such as their summer learning institute and has held lectures to promote these ideals.
