= Morgan Point Light =

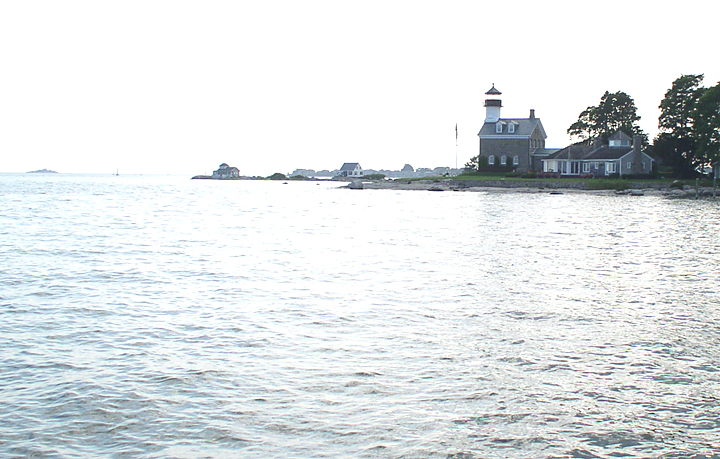
- Location: Noank, New London County, Connecticut, United States
- Coordinates: 41°18′59″N 71°59′22″W

Tower
- Constructed: 1868
- Construction: granite (tower)
- Height: 52 ft (16 m)
- Shape: octagonal tower with balcony and lantern on front the keeper's house
- Markings: White (tower), black (lantern)
- Operator: private

Light
- Deactivated: 1919
- Focal height: 61 ft (19 m)
- Lens: sixth order Fresnel lens

Morgan Point Lighthouse is a lighthouse in Noank, Connecticut, United States, on the west side of the mouth of the Mystic River.

== History ==
In 1831 the original 25-foot (7.6 m) granite tower was built. However, there were many complaints that the light was too dim, so as shipbuilding became more prominent in the area, a new lighthouse was needed and the current Morgan Point Lighthouse was built in 1868.

In 1919, Morgan Point was discontinued and later sold to a private owner.

The structure is of the same design as lighthouses at Sheffield Island in Norwalk; Great Captain Island in Greenwich; Old Field Point Light and Plum Island in New York; and Block Island North in Rhode Island.

It is a granite ashlar building with an octagonal tower rising above. It has a "dentillated cornice and a slate-shingled roof. Inside, the lightkeeper's room is fitted out like a cabin, with fold-out desk and built-in bunk." As of 1978, it was a private residence and the lamp had been removed.

It is included in the Noank Historic District, which was listed on the National Register of Historic Places in 1978. It is no longer an active aid to navigation and is not open to the public.

== Noank Light 5 ==
Noank Light 5
- Location: Noank, Connecticut, United States
- Coordinates: 41°18′59″N 71°59′14″W

Tower
- Construction: stone (foundation)
- Shape: square skeletal tower with light

Light
- Focal height: 17 m (56 ft)
- Characteristic: Q G

Noank Light 5 is the active light substitute of the lighthouse, located offshore Morgan Point on the west side of Mystic River at the entrance of the harbour. It consists of a small skeletal tower on a stone basement and emits a quick green light.

== See also ==
- List of lighthouses in Connecticut
- List of lighthouses in the United States
