= USS Constance II =

Patrol vessel of the United States Navy

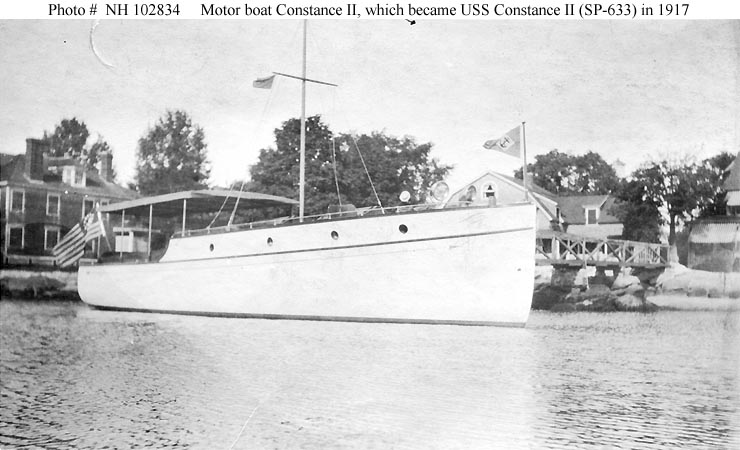
- Constance II as a private motorboat sometime between 1914 and 1917.

History

United States
- Name: USS Constance II (1917–1920); USS YP-633 (1920–1922)
- Namesake: Constance II was her previous name retained; YP-633 was her post-17 July 1920 hull code
- Builder: Holmes Motor Boat Company, West Mystic, Connecticut
- Completed: 1914
- Acquired: 6 July 1917
- Commissioned: 30 July 1917
- Renamed: YP-633 17 July 1920
- Reclassified: "District patrol craft" (YP-633) 17 July 1920; "Small boat" 5 September 1922
- Stricken: 5 September 1922
- Fate: Became non-commissioned U.S. Navy launch
- Notes: Operated as private motorboat Constance II 1914–1917

General characteristics
- Type: Patrol vessel
- Length: 41 ft (12 m)

USS Constance II (SP-633), later USS YP-633, was a United States Navy patrol vessel in commission from 1917 to 1922.

Constance II was built as a private motorboat of the same name by the Holmes Motor Boat Company at West Mystic, Connecticut, in 1914. On 6 July 1917, the U.S. Navy acquired her from her owner, Joseph Gahm of Boston, Massachusetts, for use as a section patrol boat during World War I. She was commissioned as USS Constance II (SP-633) on 30 July 1917.

Assigned to the 1st Naval District in northern New England, Constance II performed patrol duty in the naval district for the next five years. When the U.S. Navy adopted its modern hull number system on 17 July 1920, Constance II was reclassified as "district patrol craft", redesignated YP-633, and renamed USS YP-633.

YP-633 was stricken from the naval district's list of district craft on 5 September 1922. Reclassified as a "small boat," she was reassigned to the Boston Navy Yard at Boston for use as a non-commissioned launch, in which capacity she served for some time thereafter.
