= Byram River =

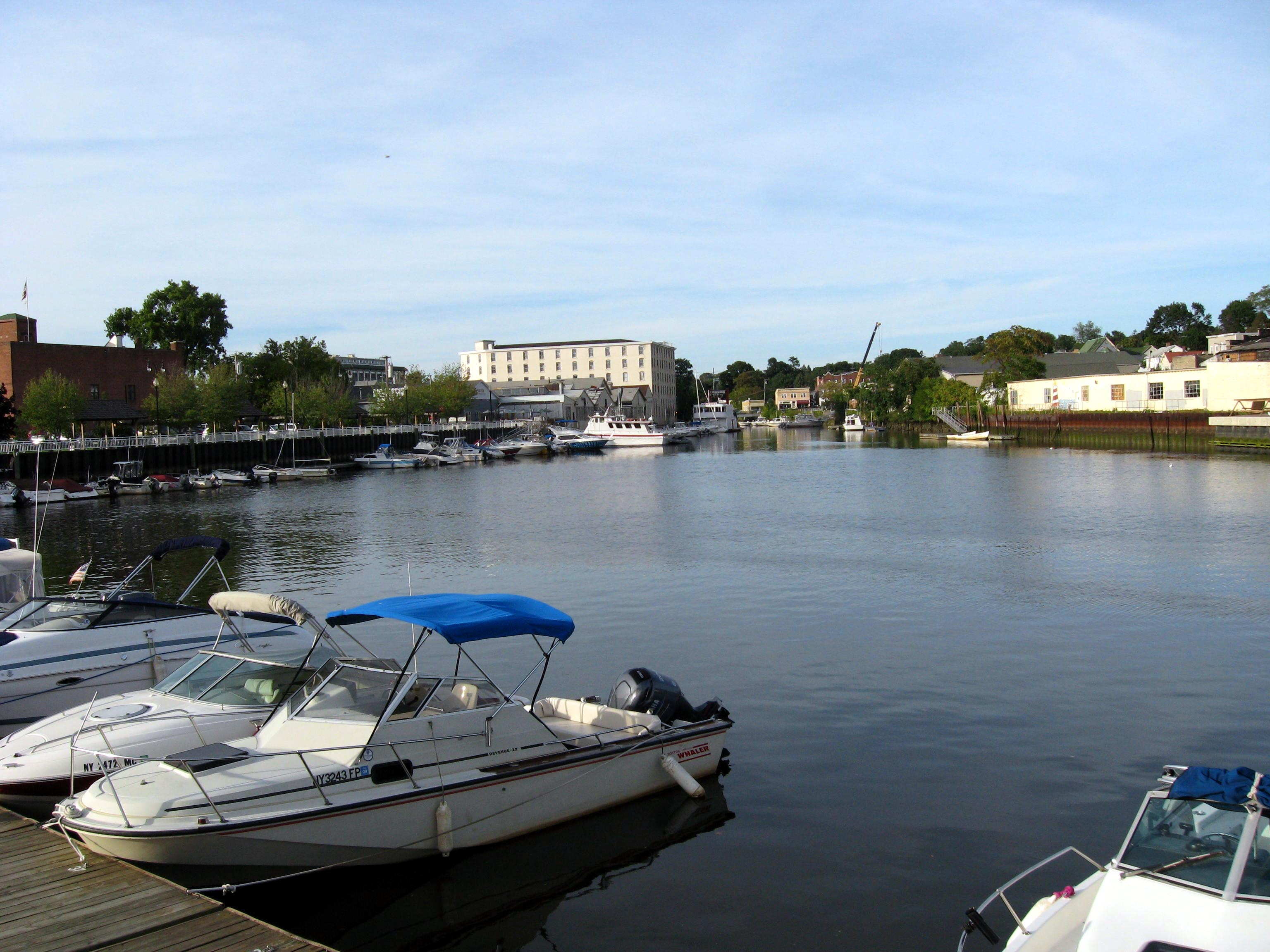
- The harbor

Location
- Country: United States
- State: Connecticut, New York
- County: Westchester County, Fairfield County

Physical characteristics
- Source: Byram Lake
  - location: North Castle, New York
  - coordinates: 41.1554°N 73.6925°W
  - elevation: 450 feet (140 m)
- Mouth: Port Chester Harbor
  - location: Port Chester, New York, Greenwich, Connecticut
  - coordinates: 40.9884°N 73.6604°W
  - elevation: 0 feet (0 m)
- Length: 13.9 mi (22.4 km)
- Basin size: 29 mi^{2} (75 km^{2})

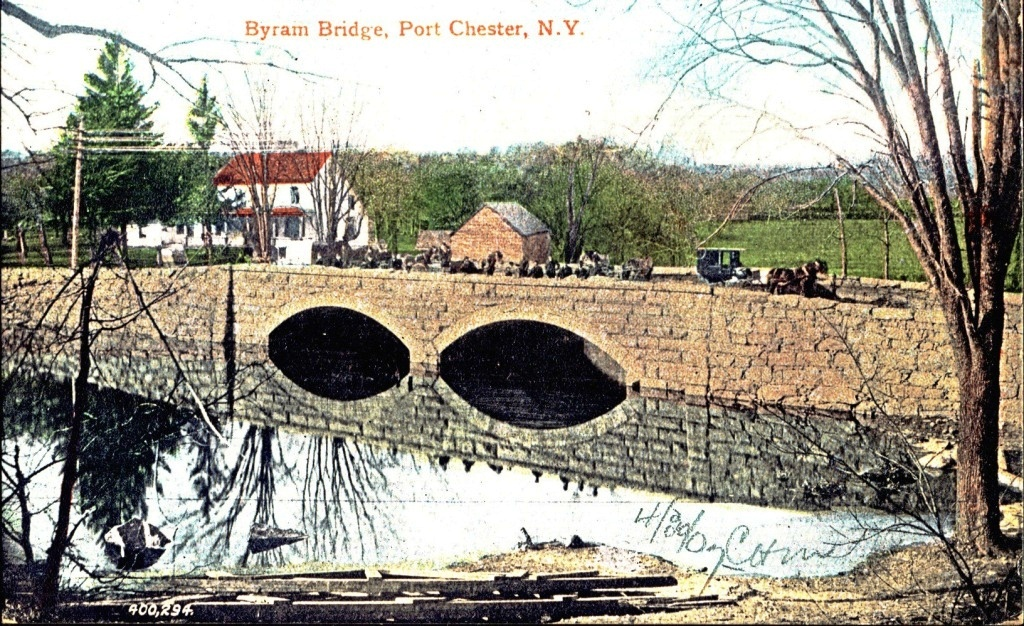
Postcard from 1906

The Byram River is a 13.9-mile (22.4 km) long river spanning southeast New York state and southwestern Connecticut in the United States. It has a 29-square-mile (75 km^{2}) drainage basin.

The river's headwaters are at Byram Lake in Westchester County, New York, at an elevation of 450 feet (140 m), and flow southward, crossing the New York-Connecticut border and eventually flowing into Long Island Sound at Port Chester Harbor. The lower portion of the river is paralleled by the Merritt Parkway in Connecticut and eventually forms the southernmost portion of the New York-Connecticut border.

Several bridges cross the river, as well as several dams controlled by the Town of Greenwich, Connecticut.

== History ==
The Byram River was once a center of economic activity where shipbuilding and fishing were major industries. The Byram section of Greenwich lies at its southern end.

On April 15, 2007, a nor'easter flooded areas near the river on both the Connecticut and New York sides. In July 2007, Greenwich town officials gave initial approval for spending $250,000 to study drainage improvement in flood-prone areas near the river, including the idea of dredging the river.

== Bridgework ==
As of the summer of 2007, three of these in northwest Greenwich had been identified by state inspectors as in critical need of repair, and all were scheduled for work:

- Bailiwick Road — already in poor shape, the bridge was further damaged by the nor'easter of April 15, 2007. In May emergency repairs were made. A redesign of the bridge may be needed to better protect against future flooding, town officials said.
- Riversville Road — Greenwich officials imposed weight restrictions on the bridge which were in effect in the summer of 2007. Dump trucks are prohibited from using it, but 10-ton box trucks and 15-ton semis are allowed.
- Sherwood Avenue — Greenwich officials imposed weight restrictions on the bridge which were in effect in the summer of 2007. Only 15-ton box trucks and 26-ton semis are allowed.

== See also ==
- List of rivers of New York
- List of rivers of Connecticut
