= Bargeboard =

Architectural element of a gable roof

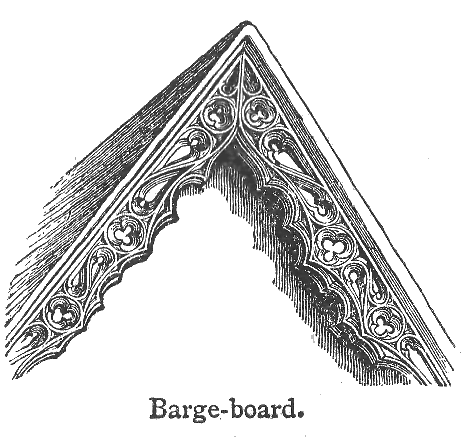
Bargeboard, 1908 illustration

A bargeboard or rake fascia is a board fastened to each projecting gable of a roof to give it strength and protection, and to conceal the otherwise exposed end grain of the horizontal timbers or purlins of the roof. The word bargeboard is probably from the Medieval Latin bargus, or barcus, a scaffold, and not from the now obsolete synonym vergeboard. Comparable gable boards appear in other European vernacular traditions under different names, such as the German Windbrett or Giebelbrett, which covers the gable-end roof overhang from below and, on Alpine and half-timbered buildings, was often decorated with painted floral ornament.

== History ==
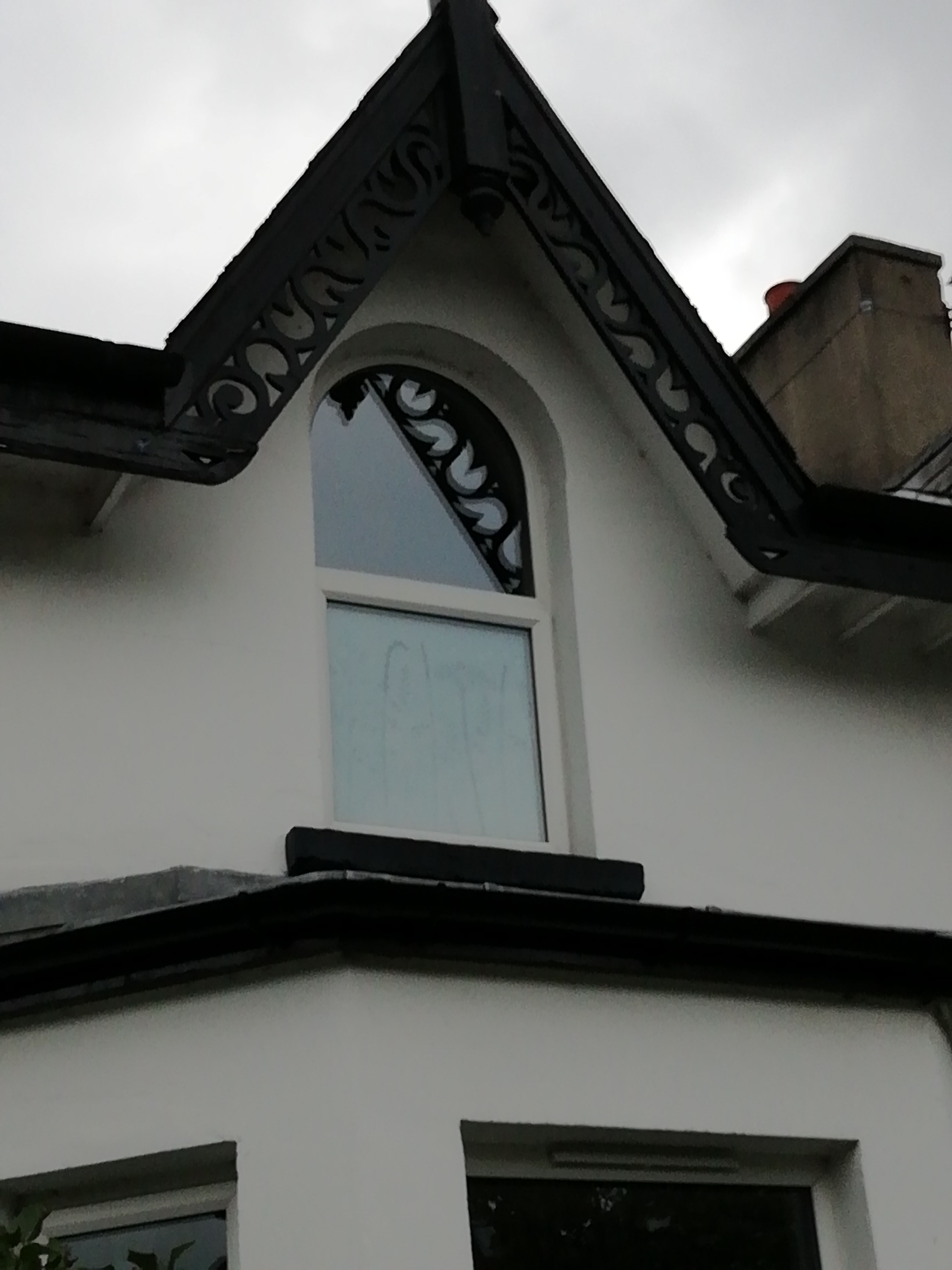
This late Victorian house at 38 Princetown Road in Bangor, County Down, Northern Ireland, has frilly bargeboards.

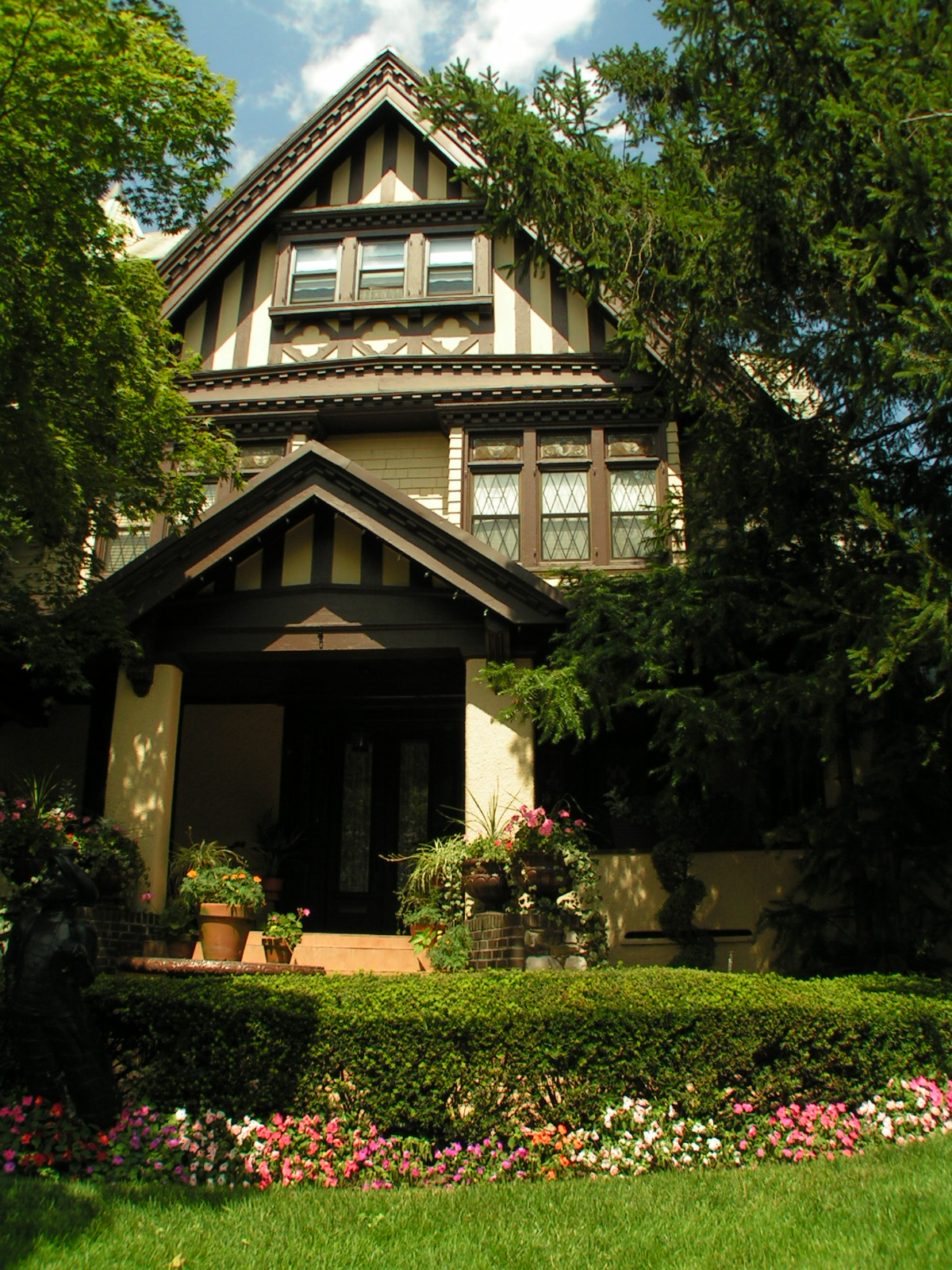
The Saitta House at Dyker Heights, Brooklyn, New York, built in 1899, has a thick bargeboard.

Historically, bargeboards are sometimes moulded only or carved, but as a rule the lower edges were cusped and had tracery in the spandrels besides being otherwise elaborated. An example in Britain was one at Ockwells in Berkshire (built 1446–1465), which was moulded and carved as if it were intended for internal work.

Modern residential rake fascias are typically made of 2-by dimensional lumber, with trim added for decoration and/or weatherproofing later.

== See also ==
- Antefix
- Cornice
- Eaves
- Fascia
- Karamon – use in Japanese architecture
- Peak ornament
- Soffit
