= Sheffield Island Light =

- U.S. National Register of Historic Places
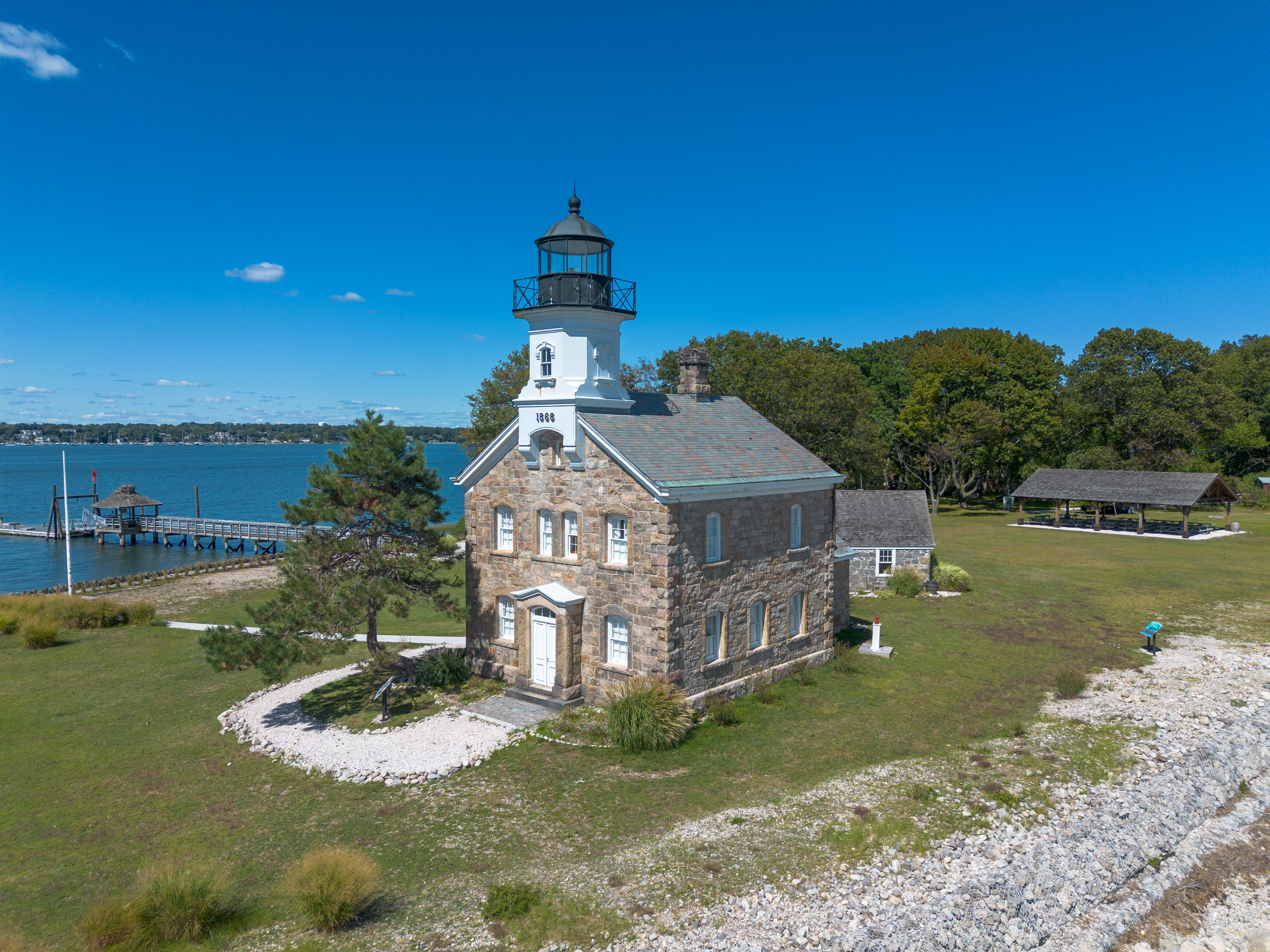
- Sheffield Island Light in 2025

- Location within Connecticut Location within the United States
- Location: Sheffield Island, Norwalk, Connecticut
- Coordinates: 41°2′55.61″N 73°25′8.93″W
- Area: less than one acre
- Built: 1868
- NRHP reference No.: 88003222
- Added to NRHP: January 19, 1989

Sheffield Island Light is a historic lighthouse located at the southern end of the Norwalk Islands in Norwalk, Connecticut. It marks the west side of the mouth of the Norwalk River on northern Long Island Sound.

== History ==
The island, at the time known as "White Island", was purchased by Captain Robert Sheffield in 1804 for $6000. In 1826 Gershom Smith, Sheffield's son in law, sold 4 of the island's 53 acres (21 ha) at the southwest point to the United States government for the purpose of building a lighthouse. Smith would serve as the first keeper for the light which was completed in 1828. At the time the island was known as Smith Island. The first light originally ran on oil.

In 1857 the light was upgraded to a fourth-order Fresnel lens. The original 30 feet (9.1 m) tower was replaced by a Victorian style limestone (masonry) dwelling, with a 44 feet (13 m) high light tower in the gable, in 1868. The Fresnel lens from 1857 was moved into the new structure and with a focal plane 51 feet (16 m) above water it was visible for more than 12 miles (19 km). The lighthouse is of the same design as lighthouses at Great Captain Island and Morgan Point in Connecticut; Old Field Point Light and Plum Island in New York; and Block Island North in Rhode Island.

Greens Ledge Light was built to the west of Sheffield in 1900 and was better located to warn ships of the rocks and shoals on the approach to Sheffield Island harbor and Norwalk harbor. Sheffield Island Light was then deactivated in 1902. Sheffield Island Lighthouse was put up for sale in 1914 and purchased by Thorsten O. Stabell. In 1986 the 118-year-old structure was purchased by the Norwalk Seaport Association for renovation and restoration. In 1989 the lighthouse was placed on the National Register of Historic Places. In 1993 an electric generator was added to the structure. In the fall of that year, a great storm flooded the basement of the building and artifacts were lost or destroyed. In 2002 the Seaport association started ferry service to the island, which is still running. In October 2011 the lighthouse was re-lit by a solar powered system installed to replace the gasoline generator system. The beacon is focused only on the Norwalk side and is not intended for use as navigation.

== See also ==
- National Register of Historic Places listings in Fairfield County, Connecticut
