= Old Field, New York =

- Village
- Incorporated Village of Old Field
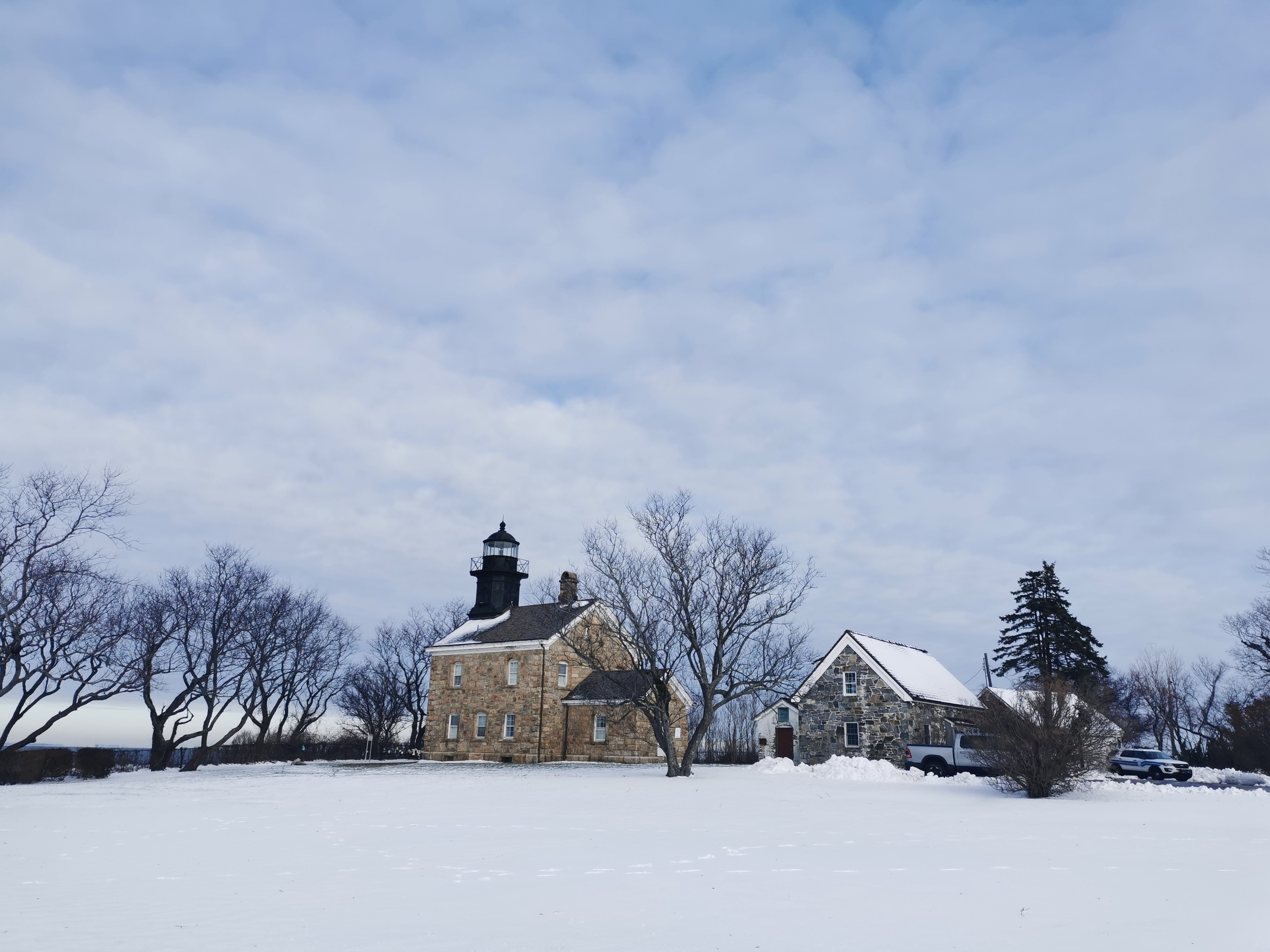
- The Old Field Point Light, which, along with the adjacent Keeper's Cottage, serves as the village's Village Hall complex.

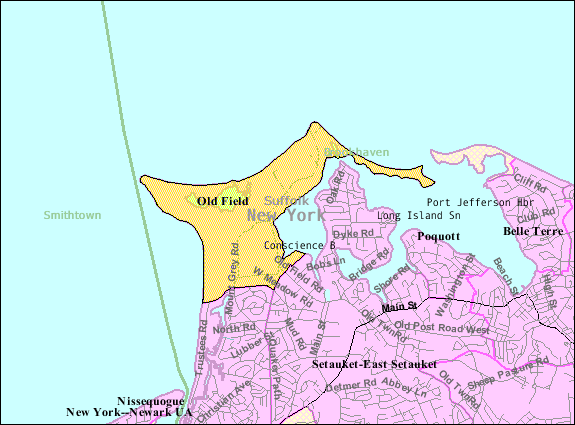
- U.S. Census map

- Location within the state of New York
- Coordinates: 40°57′45″N 73°7′49″W
- Country: United States
- State: New York
- County: Suffolk
- Town: Brookhaven
- Incorporated: 1927

Government
  - Mayor: Tom Pirro

Area
  - Total: 2.19 sq mi (5.67 km^{2})
  - Land: 2.07 sq mi (5.36 km^{2})
  - Water: 0.12 sq mi (0.31 km^{2})
- Elevation: 6.6 ft (2 m)

Population (2020)
  - Total: 893
  - Density: 431.5/sq mi (166.59/km^{2})
- Time zone: UTC−05:00 (Eastern Time Zone)
  - Summer (DST): UTC−04:00
- ZIP Code: 11733
- Area codes: 631, 934
- FIPS code: 36-54617
- GNIS feature ID: 0959276
- Website: www.oldfieldny.org

Old Field is a village located in the Town of Brookhaven in Suffolk County, on Long Island, in New York, United States. As of the 2020 census, Old Field had a population of 893.

== History ==
The village incorporated in 1927. The Old Field Point Light located on the northern tip of Old Field, dates back to 1823. It was built by the United States government for $2,500. The rest of the lighthouse was finished in 1824 for an additional $1,500. The lighthouse and adjacent Keeper's Cottage serve as the Old Field Village Hall complex.

== Geography ==
According to the United States Census Bureau, the village has a total area of 2.2 square miles (5.7 km^{2}), of which 2.1 square miles (5.4 km^{2}) is land and 0.1 square miles (0.26 km^{2}) is water.

The tidal estuary Flax Pond is located along the northern shore of the village.

== Demographics ==
Historical population
Census	Pop.	Note	%±
1930	202		—
1940	123		−39.1%
1950	238		93.5%
1960	373		56.7%
1970	812		117.7%
1980	829		2.1%
1990	765		−7.7%
2000	947		23.8%
2010	918		−3.1%
2020	893		−2.7%
U.S. Decennial Census

As of the census of 2000, there were 947 people, 313 households, and 268 families residing in the village. The population density was 459.1 inhabitants per square mile (177.3/km^{2}). There were 346 housing units at an average density of 167.7 per square mile (64.7/km^{2}). The racial makeup of the village was 94.61% White, 0.74% African American, 0.11% Native American, 3.59% Asian, 0.42% from other races, and 0.53% from two or more races. Hispanic or Latino of any race were 2.32% of the population.

There were 313 households, out of which 42.5% had children under the age of 18 living with them, 80.2% were married couples living together, 4.5% had a female householder with no husband present, and 14.1% were non-families. 10.5% of all households were made up of individuals, and 4.8% had someone living alone who was 65 years of age or older. The average household size was 3.03 and the average family size was 3.23.

In the village, the population was spread out, with 30.0% under the age of 18, 4.6% from 18 to 24, 20.9% from 25 to 44, 32.1% from 45 to 64, and 12.4% who were 65 years of age or older. The median age was 42 years. For every 100 females, there were 98.9 males. For every 100 females age 18 and over, there were 98.5 males.

The median income for a household in the village was $165,398, and the median income for a family was $202,071. Males had a median income of $100,000 versus $33,594 for females. The per capita income for the village was $73,658. About 2.8% of families and 7.4% of the population were below the poverty threshold, including 9.5% of those under age 18 and none of those age 65 or over.

== Government ==
The current mayor of Old Field is Tom Gulbransen, the Deputy Mayor is William Schaefer, and the Village Trustees are Rebecca Van Der Bogart, Morgan Morrison and Hannah Smith.

== Notable people ==
- Robert Cushman Murphy, ornithologist
- Jim Simons, cryptanalyst, mathematician, hedge-fund founder and philanthropist
- Francis B. Spinola, politician.

== See also ==
- Indian old field
- Old Field Point Light
