= Mystic River Historic District =

Historic district in Connecticut, United States

- U.S. National Register of Historic Places
- U.S. Historic district
- Location within Connecticut Location within the United States
- Location: Route 1 and CT 215, Groton, Connecticut
- Coordinates: 41°21′15″N 71°58′30″W
- Area: 235 acres (95 ha)
- Architect: Multiple
- Architectural style: Late 19th and 20th Century Revivals, Greek Revival, Late Victorian
- NRHP reference No.: 79002728
- Added to NRHP: August 24, 1979

The Mystic River Historic District encompasses the part of the village of Mystic, Connecticut that is on the Groton side of the Mystic River. The district was added to the National Register of Historic Places on August 24, 1979, approximately 235-acre (95 ha) which includes much of the village of West Mystic and many buildings from the 19th century.

The historic district includes properties along Route 1, West Mystic Avenue, Route 215, High Street, Pearl Street, and Cliff Street. Mystic Pizza is located in the district, made famous by the movie of the same name.

According to the 1979 National Register nomination, the importance of the district is derived "from the completeness of the 19th-century community here preserved. Seldom are houses, public buildings, stores, and factories of a 19th century town all in place, in good condition, and still in use, as they are in Mystic. The variety of architectural styles that the prosperous seafaring citizens employed in building up their community provide fine examples of the ongoing, 19th-century development of taste and design."

The district's boundaries are similar to those of a local historic district that was designated in 1974, but it includes more modern structures than were included in the local designation, and its boundary lines are less irregular. It includes the former train depot of West Mystic.

In 1978, the district included about 470 sites and structures, of which 265 were houses built in Greek Revival, Italianate, or Queen Anne architectural styles that were popular during the 19th century. Two historic sites in the district are:

- site of Fort Rachel where a single 12-pounder cannon repulsed British attack on Mystic in 1814
- site of the Mystic massacre of Pequot Indians in 1637, location not precisely known

== See also ==
- Pequot Fort, located just north of the district
- Mystic Bridge Historic District, encompassing the historic part of Mystic village in Stonington
- National Register of Historic Places listings in New London County, Connecticut

== Pictures of Mystic River Historic District ==
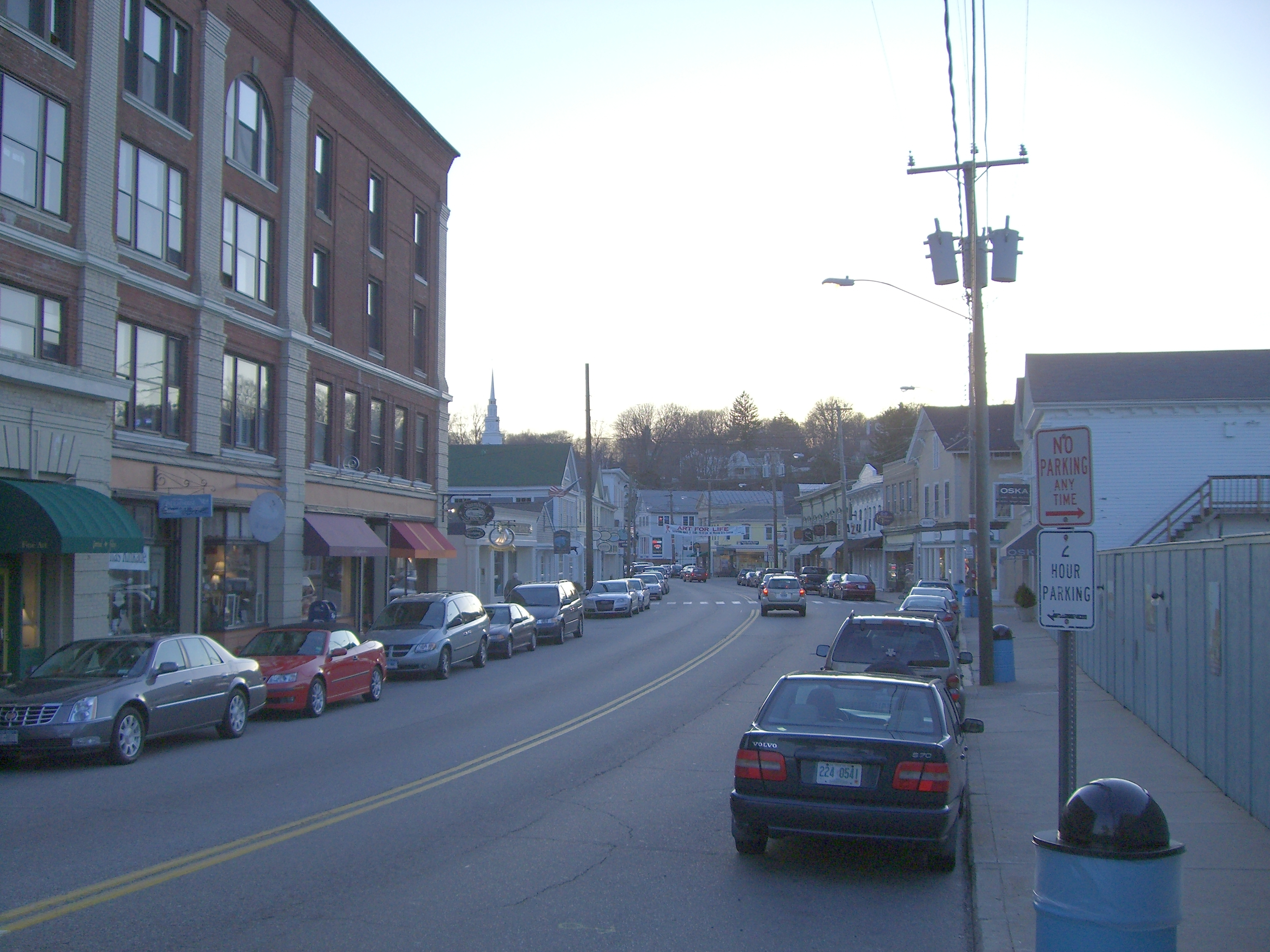
The Groton part of downtown Mystic.

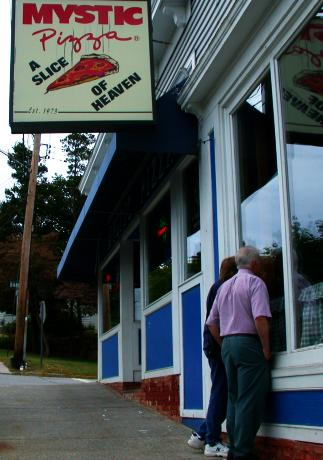
Tourists look into the famous pizza parlor in Mystic.

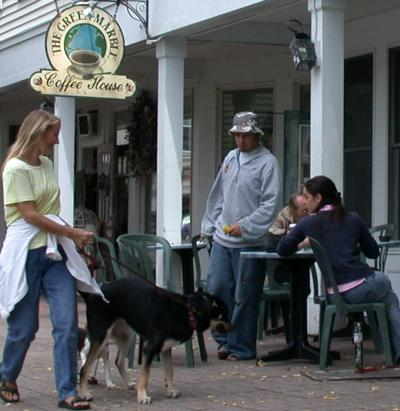
A coffeeshop along Main Street in Mystic.
