= Port Chester Harbor (Long Island Sound) =

Bay in New York

- Location within New York
- Location: Port Chester, New York
- Coordinates: 40.9845°N 73.6605°W
- Islands: none

Port Chester Harbor is the name of a bay located in the village of Port Chester on Long Island Sound, in Westchester County, New York. The harbor is the entrance to Byram River, which leads to the town of Port Chester, and lies 1 mile west-northwestward of Great Captain Island. It is protected by a breakwater, which is marked at its south end by Port Chester light.
