= Noank, Connecticut =

Census-designated place in Connecticut, United States

- Census-designated place
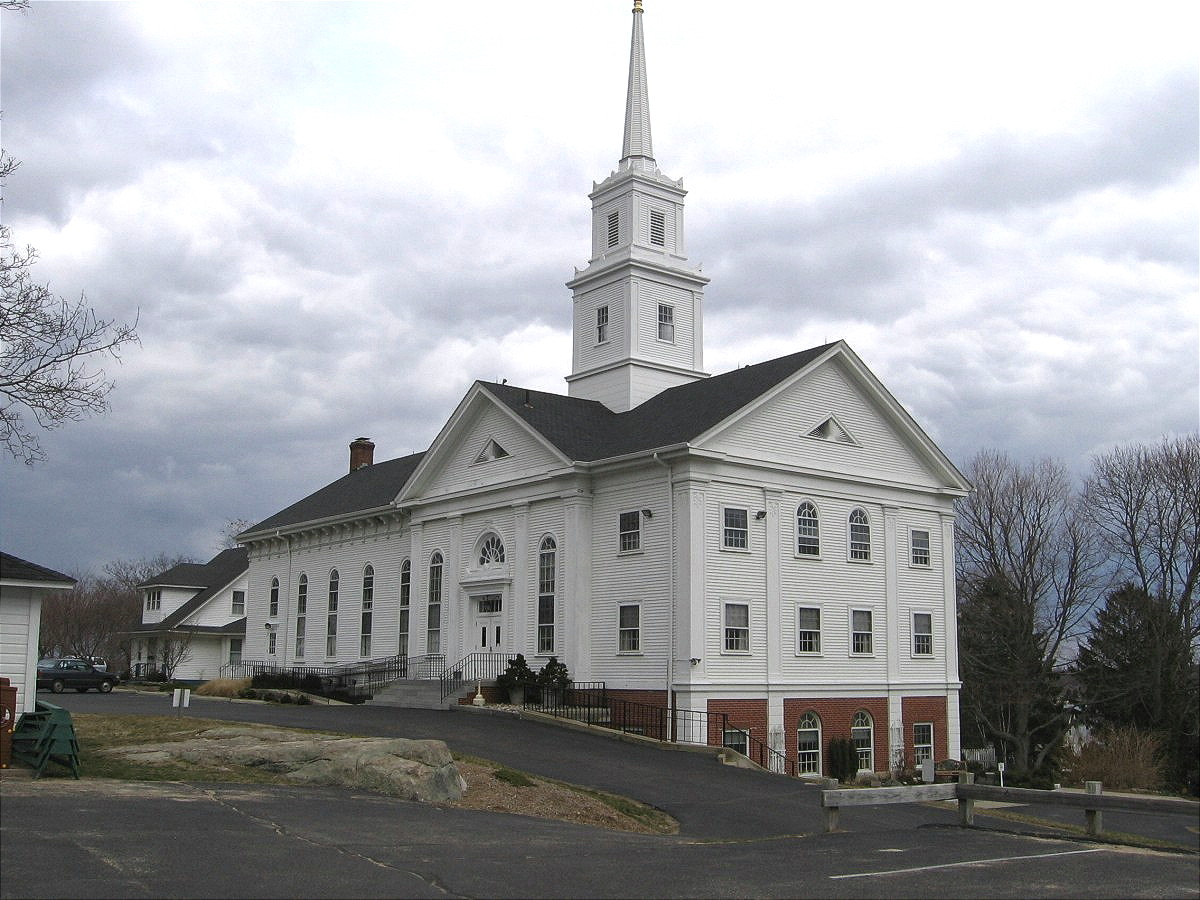
- Noank Baptist Church

- Location in New London County, Connecticut
- Coordinates: 41°19′30″N 71°59′30″W
- Country: United States
- State: Connecticut
- County: New London
- Town: Groton

Area
  - Total: 2.2 sq mi (5.7 km^{2})
  - Land: 1.5 sq mi (4.0 km^{2})
  - Water: 0.66 sq mi (1.7 km^{2})
- Elevation: 75 ft (23 m)

Population (2010)
  - Total: 1,796
  - Density: 1,200/sq mi (450/km^{2})
- Time zone: UTC-5 (Eastern (EST))
  - Summer (DST): UTC-4 (EDT)
- ZIP code: 06340
- Area code: 860
- FIPS code: 09-53260
- GNIS feature ID: 2377840

Noank (/ˈnoʊæŋk/ NOH-ank) is a village in the town of Groton, Connecticut. This dense community of historic homes and local businesses sits on a small, steep peninsula at the mouth of the Mystic River and has a long tradition of fishing, lobstering, and boatbuilding. The village is listed as a historic district on the National Register of Historic Places and is the home of multiple seaside lobster shacks and oyster aquaculture operations. As of the 2020 census, Noank had a population of 1,654.

== History ==
In 1614, the area was known as Nauyang (meaning "point of land") and was a summer camping ground of the Pequot people, but they were driven out in 1655 following the Pequot War. The land comprising Noank Peninsula was acquired by James Morgan through a lottery in 1712.

The community grew from a tradition of fishing, lobstering, and boatbuilding. In 1861, Charles Mallory and Elihu Spicer Jr. established the C. H. Mallory and Company Steamship line. In 1879, Robert Palmer put steam railways into his shipbuilding plant in Noank. His company became one of the largest in the United States at the time for making wooden ships, building one thousand vessels ranging from fishing boats to sound steamers. The fishing sailboat type known as the "Noank Smack" is indigenous to this village, such as the Emma C. Berry preserved at the Mystic Seaport. Around 1912, the Connecticut State Lobster Hatchery was established in Noank. Today, the village has several marinas, including one with 158 slips.

Noank hosts one of the longest running continuous Memorial Day parades in the country, held annually since 1876. The majority of the community was listed on the National Register of Historic Places in 1979 as a historic district, including houses and businesses dating back to 1840. The significance of the historic district is primarily in the domestic architecture preserved in about 260 houses. Scenes for the movie Mystic Pizza were filmed at Ford's Lobsters in Noank.

== Demographics ==
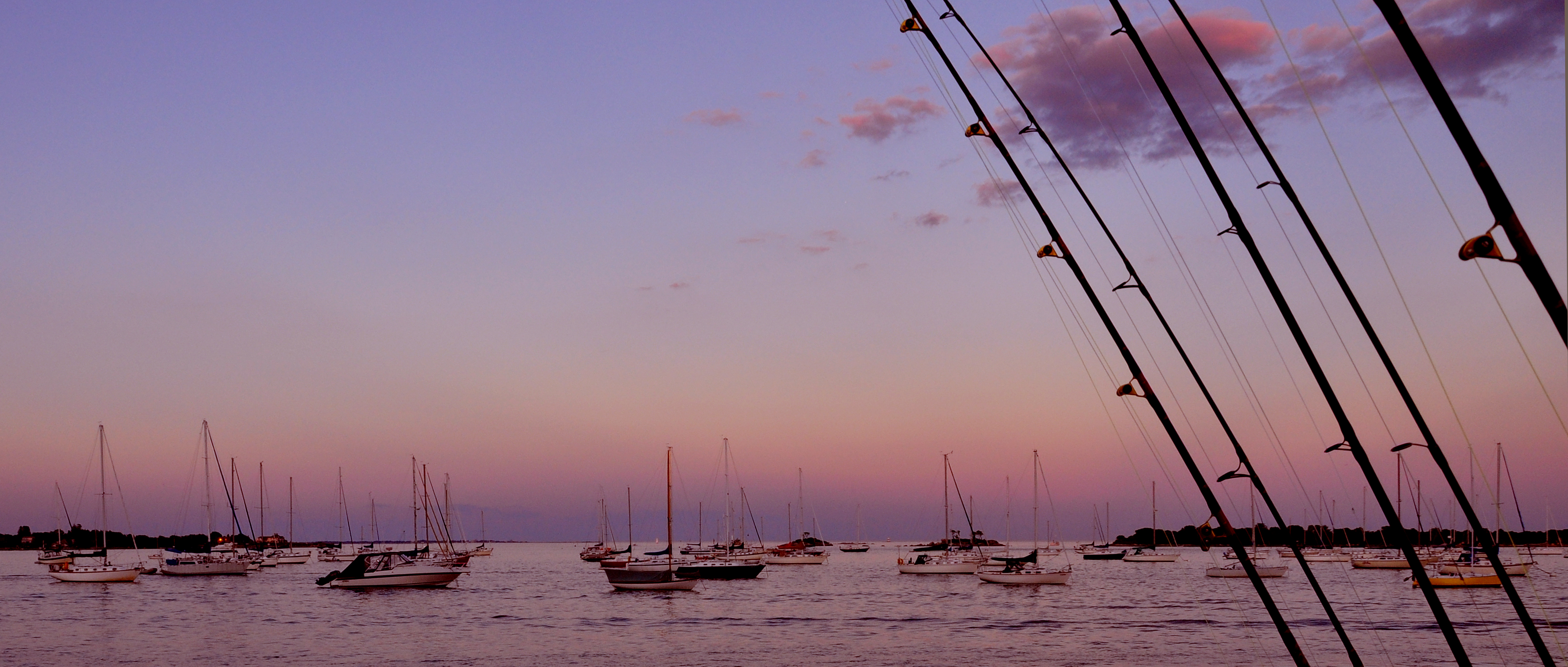
Scenic harbor in Noank

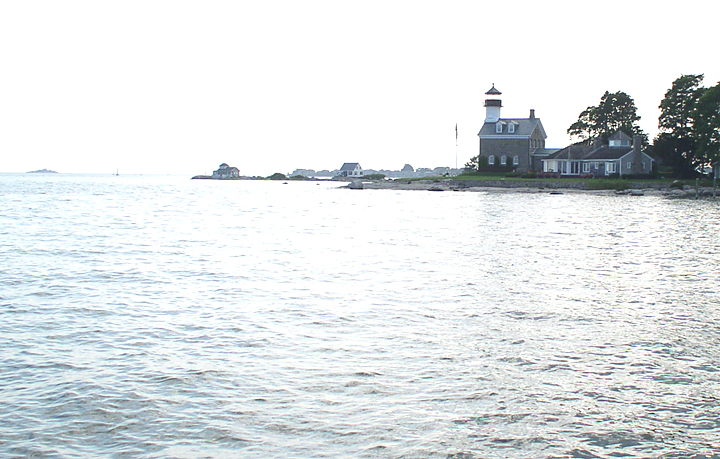
Morgan Point Light in Noank

According to the United States Census Bureau, the village has a total area of 2.2 square miles (5.7 km^{2}), of which 1.5 square miles (4.0 km^{2}) is land and 0.7 square miles (1.7 km^{2}) (30.32%) is water. It includes areas as far west as Palmer Cove and as far north as U.S. Route 1.

=== 2020 census ===
As of the 2020 census, Noank had a population of 1,654. The median age was 58.1 years. 12.3% of residents were under the age of 18 and 34.1% of residents were 65 years of age or older. For every 100 females there were 88.8 males, and for every 100 females age 18 and over there were 86.1 males age 18 and over.

96.2% of residents lived in urban areas, while 3.8% lived in rural areas.

There were 789 households in Noank, of which 14.7% had children under the age of 18 living in them. Of all households, 53.4% were married-couple households, 14.8% were households with a male householder and no spouse or partner present, and 27.5% were households with a female householder and no spouse or partner present. About 33.9% of all households were made up of individuals and 21.7% had someone living alone who was 65 years of age or older.

There were 926 housing units, of which 14.8% were vacant. The homeowner vacancy rate was 0.5% and the rental vacancy rate was 9.7%.

Racial composition as of the 2020 census
| Race | Number | Percent |
|---|---|---|
| White | 1,502 | 90.8% |
| Black or African American | 10 | 0.6% |
| American Indian and Alaska Native | 2 | 0.1% |
| Asian | 36 | 2.2% |
| Native Hawaiian and Other Pacific Islander | 0 | 0.0% |
| Some other race | 12 | 0.7% |
| Two or more races | 92 | 5.6% |
| Hispanic or Latino (of any race) | 57 | 3.4% |

=== 2000 census ===
As of the census of 2000, there were 1,830 people, 846 households, and 501 families residing in the CDP. The population density was 1,187.7 inhabitants per square mile (458.6/km^{2}). There were 911 housing units at an average density of 591.2 per square mile (228.3/km^{2}). The racial makeup of the CDP was 96.45% White, 0.98% African American, 0.16% Native American, 1.31% Asian, 0.55% from other races, and 0.55% from two or more races. Hispanic or Latino of any race were 2.79% of the population.

There were 846 households, out of which 21.9% had children under the age of 18 living with them, 51.8% were married couples living together, 6.4% had a female householder with no husband present, and 40.7% were non-families. 35.5% of all households were made up of individuals, and 16.8% had someone living alone who was 65 years of age or older. The average household size was 2.15 and the average family size was 2.78.

In the CDP, the population was spread out, with 20.3% under the age of 18, 3.4% from 18 to 24, 24.9% from 25 to 44, 29.5% from 45 to 64, and 21.9% who were 65 years of age or older. The median age was 46 years. For every 100 females, there were 85.2 males. For every 100 females age 18 and over, there were 83.5 males.

The median income for a household in the CDP was $61,250, and the median income for a family was $77,596. Males had a median income of $59,091 versus $48,333 for females. The per capita income for the CDP was $41,355. None of the families and 2.5% of the population were living below the poverty line, including no persons under 18 and 2.9% of those over 64.

== Education ==
The census-designated place, along with the rest of Groton Town, is in the Groton School District.

== Notable people ==
- Artist Henry Ward Ranger lived in Noank.
- Painter Robert Brackman (1898–1980) lived and worked here.
- Aviator Amelia Earhart married George Palmer Putnam in Noank on February 7, 1931.
- Arctic explorer Peter Freuchen (1886–1957) lived in Noank.
- Painter Lars Thorsen (1876–1952) lived and worked in Noank.
