= Block Island North Light =

Lighthouse in Rhode Island, United States

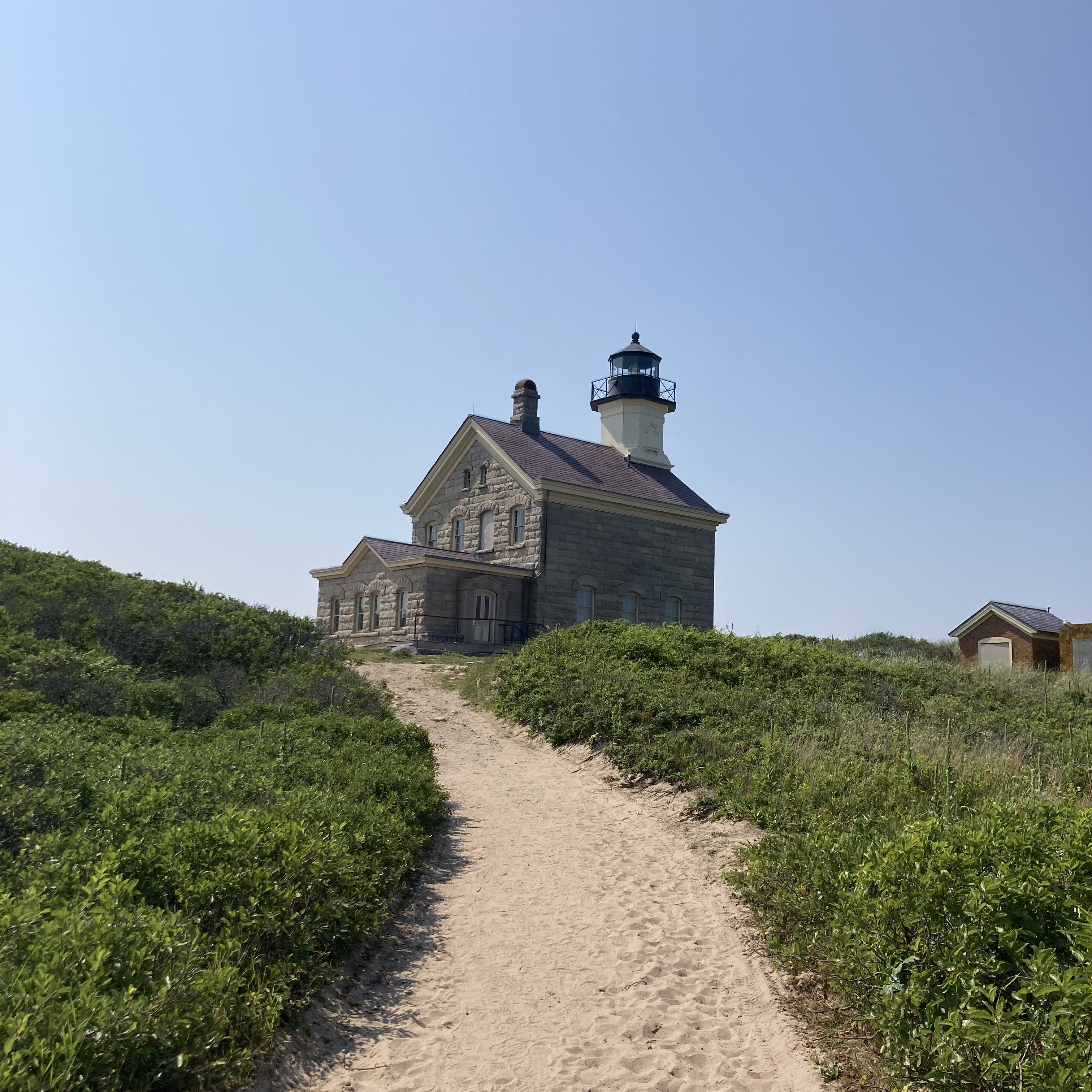
- Location: Sandy Point, New Shoreham, Rhode Island
- Coordinates: 41°13′39″N 71°34′34″W

Tower
- Constructed: 1867
- Construction: Granite/wood
- Automated: 1955
- Height: 55 feet (17 m)
- Shape: Octagonal tower
- Markings: Brown
- Heritage: National Register of Historic Places listed place
- Fog signal: none

Light
- First lit: 1867
- Deactivated: 1973-1989, 2008-2010
- Focal height: 61 feet (19 m)
- Lens: Fourth order Fresnel
- Range: 11 nautical miles (20 km; 13 mi)
- Characteristic: Flashing white light every 5 seconds
- Block Island North Light
- U.S. National Register of Historic Places
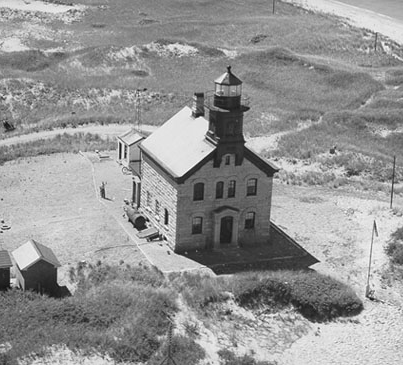
- undated USCG photograph
- MPS: Lighthouses of Rhode Island TR (AD)
- NRHP reference No.: 74000008
- Added to NRHP: May 23, 1974

Block Island North Light (Lighthouse), built in 1867, is a historic lighthouse on Block Island, Rhode Island (New Shoreham).

== History ==
The first light on the site was built in 1829. The current structure at Sandy Point is the fourth lighthouse built on the site and was made of granite and iron in 1867. The light was deactivated in 1973 and United States Fish and Wildlife Service acquired the lighthouse. The lighthouse was listed on the National Register of Historic Places in 1974.

After years of neglect, the lighthouse, along with two acres of land, was sold to New Shoreham in 1984 for US$1. Following much renovation by the North Light Commission, it was relighted in 1989, and a museum opened on the first floor in 1993. Then, in 2008, the light underwent restoration at Georgetown Ironworks in Massachusetts and was returned in 2009. Finally, on 23 October 2010, a relighting ceremony took place.

== Structure ==
The building is made of brown granite. The tower is octagonal in shape, 55 feet (17 m) in height, and provides a focal plane height of 61 feet (19 m). It contains a fourth-order Fresnel lens, which flashes white light every five seconds, and has a range of 11 nautical miles (20 km; 13 mi). The lighthouse does not have a foghorn.

A wind generator and solar panels provide much of the power for the building.

== See also ==
- Block Island Southeast Light
- National Register of Historic Places listings in Washington County, Rhode Island
