= Block Island =

Island in Rhode Island, United States

New Shoreham, Rhode Island Block Island
- Town
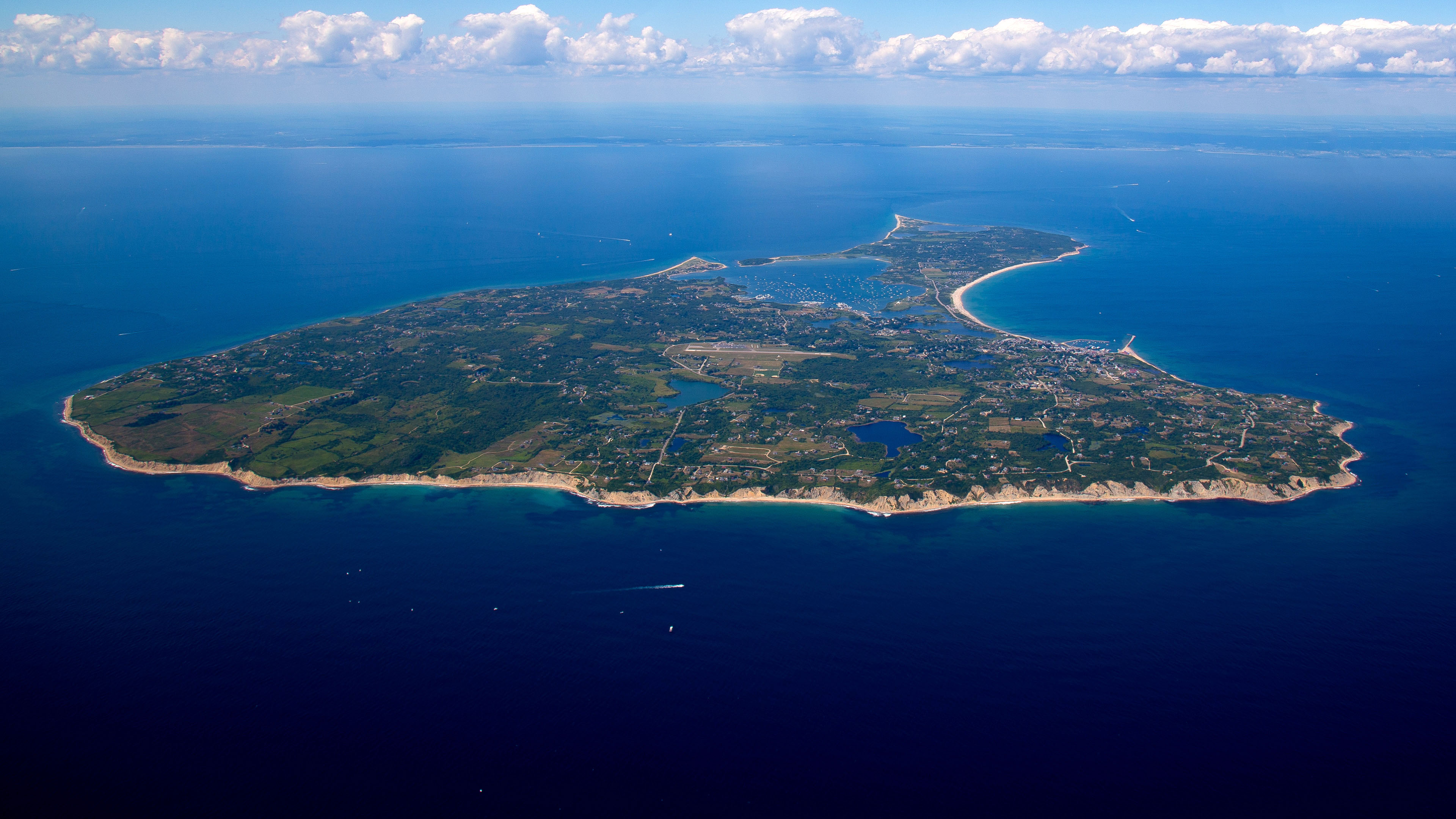
- Block Island looking north over Block Island Sound. The coast of Rhode Island is seen in the distance.

- Seal Logo
- Nickname: Manisses, meaning Manitou's Little Island (used by Narragansett people)
- Interactive map of New Shoreham, Rhode Island
- Coordinates: 41°10′11″N 71°34′48″W
- Country: United States
- State: Rhode Island
- County: Washington
- Established: 1664

Government
  - Type: Council-manager

Area
  - Land: 9.73 sq mi (25.2 km^{2})
- Elevation: 13 ft (4.0 m)

Population (2020)
  - Total: 1,410
- Time zone: UTC−5 (EST)
  - Summer (DST): UTC−4 (EDT)
- ZIP Code: 02807
- Area code: 401
- Website: www.newshorehamri.gov

Block Island is an island of the Outer Lands coastal archipelago in New England, located approximately 9 miles (14 km) south of mainland Rhode Island and 14 miles (23 km) east of Long Island's Montauk Point. The island is coterminous with the town of New Shoreham, Rhode Island, and is part of Washington County. The island is named after Dutch explorer Adriaen Block, and the town was named for Shoreham, West Sussex, in England.

Block Island is a popular summer tourist destination known for its bicycling, hiking, sailing, fishing, surfing and beaches. It is home to the historic lighthouses Block Island North Light, on the northern tip of the island, and Block Island Southeast Light, on the southeastern coast. About 40 percent of the island is set aside for conservation, and much of the northwestern tip of the island is an undeveloped natural area and resting stop for birds along the Atlantic flyway. The Nature Conservancy includes Block Island on its list of "The Last Great Places", which consists of 12 sites in the Western Hemisphere.

Popular events include the annual Fourth of July Parade, celebration, and fireworks. The island's population can triple over the normal summer vacation crowd. As of the 2020 Census, the island's population is 1,410 living on a land area of 9.734 square miles (25.211 km^{2}).

== History ==
=== Before 1637 ===
Block Island was formed by the same receding glaciers that formed the Outer Lands of Cape Cod, the Hamptons, Martha's Vineyard, and Nantucket during the end of the last ice age thousands of years ago.

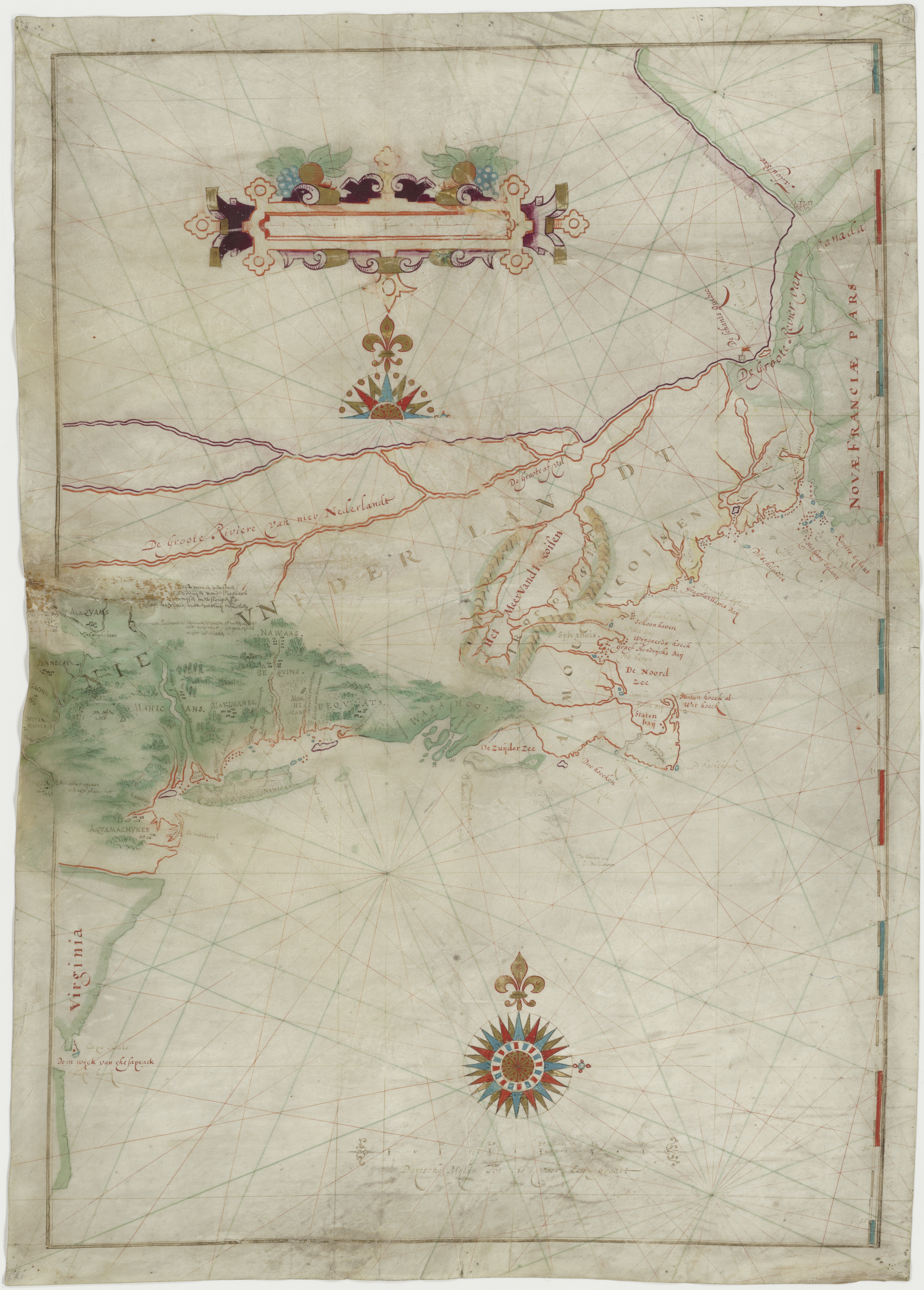
On this 1614 map, Block Island is named "Adrianbloxeyland".

The Niantic people called the island "Manisses" (meaning "Manitou's Little Island"), or just "Little Island". Archaeological sites indicate that these people lived largely by hunting deer, catching fish and shellfish, and growing corn, beans, and squash, presumably with the Three Sisters technique. They migrated from forest to coastal areas to take advantage of seasonal resources. One modern researcher has theorized that indigenous groups may have established a settlement as early as 500 BC, although there is no consensus on that idea.

Giovanni da Verrazzano sighted the island in 1524 and named it "Claudia" in honor of Claude, Duchess of Brittany, queen consort of France and the wife of Francis I. However, several contemporaneous maps identified the same island as "Luisa", after Louise of Savoy, the Queen Mother of France and the mother of Francis I. Verrazano's ship log stated that the island was "full of hilles, covered with trees, well-peopled for we saw fires all along the coast." Almost 100 years later, Dutch explorer Adriaen Block charted the island in 1614; he simply named it for himself, and this was the name that stuck.

=== Pequot War ===
Former Massachusetts Governor John Endicott attacking the Niantics on Block Island in the summer of 1637

The growing tensions among the tribes of the region in this time caused the Niantics to split into two divisions: the Western Niantics, who allied with the Pequots and Mohegans, and the Eastern Niantics, who allied with the Narragansetts.

In 1632, indigenous people (likely Western Niantics associated with the Pequots) killed colonial traders John Stone and Walter Norton, and the Pequots of eastern Connecticut were blamed. A Pequot delegation presented magistrates in Boston with two bushels of wampum and a bundle of sticks representing the number of beavers and otters with which they would compensate the colonists for the deaths. They sought peace with the colonies and also requested help establishing concord with the Narragansetts, who bordered them to the east. The colonial authorities, in turn, demanded the people responsible for killing Stone and Norton, a promise not to interfere with colonial settlement in Connecticut, and 400 fathoms of wampum and the pelts of 40 beavers and 30 otters.

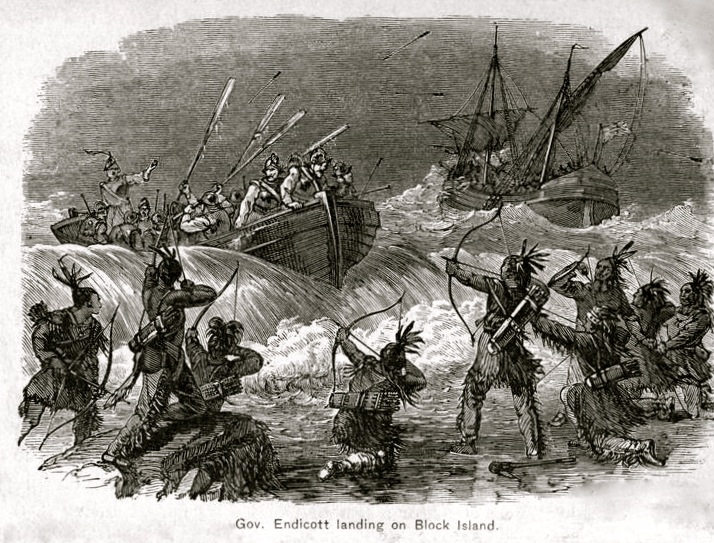
The Niantics defending themselves on Block Island in the summer of 1637

In 1636, John Gallup came across the boat of trader John Oldham, a noted troublemaker. Oldham had flirted with impropriety since the day that he landed on American soil. Not long after arriving in Plymouth in 1623, he "grew very perverse and showed a spirit of great malignancy," according to Plymouth Colony Governor William Bradford. He was later accused of religious subversion and responded with impertinence, hurling invective at his accusers and even drawing a knife on Captain Myles Standish. He was banished from Plymouth and fled to Massachusetts Bay, settling first in Nantasket, then Cape Ann, and finally Watertown, where he continued to indulge his penchant for mayhem. Despite his unsavory reputation, Massachusetts Bay sought his extensive knowledge of the New England coast when they asked him to retrieve a hefty ransom on the colony's behalf. It was on this mission that Oldham was murdered and dismembered.

In August, the Massachusetts authorities dispatched a punitive expedition of ninety men to Block Island under the command of John Endicott to avenge Oldham's murder. The expedition was ordered by governor of Massachusetts Sir Henry Vane to "massacre all of the Native men on the island" and capture the women and children, who would then be sold into slavery. Upon arriving on Block Island, the expedition burned sixty Niantic wigwams and all the cornfields on the island. The expedition also shot every dog they could find, though the Niantic fled into the woods and the colonists killed fourteen people. Deciding that this murder spree and razing was insufficient, Endicott and his men sailed over to Fort Saybrook before going after the Pequot village at the mouth of the Thames River to demand one thousand fathoms of wampum to pay for the murder. They took some Pequot children as hostages to ensure payment, with these incidents being seen as the initial events that led to the Pequot War.

=== Settlement ===
Massachusetts Bay Colony claimed the island by conquest. In 1658, the colony sold the island to a group of men headed up by Endicott. In 1661, the Endicott group sold the island to a party of twelve settlers that later grew to sixteen (of whom only seven actually settled there) led by John Allcock, who are today memorialized at Settler's Rock, near Cow's Cove. In 1663, island settler Thomas Terry gave six acres of land at the island's largest fresh pond and its surrounding area to four "chief sachems". Their names were recorded as Ninnecunshus, Jaguante, Tunkawatten, and Senatick, but they were known by the colonists as Mr. Willeam, Repleave (Reprive), and Soconosh. This land was given to "them being the Cheife Sachems upon the Island there Heires & Assignes Forever to plant and Improve". This land was then known as the Indian Lands. The Sachems called the Fresh Pond Tonnotounknug. In 1664, Indians on the island numbered somewhere from 1,200 to 1,500. By 1774, that number had been reduced to fifty-one. A Dutch map of 1685 clearly shows Block Island, indicated as Adriaen Blocks Eylant ("Adrian Block's Island").

In the late seventeenth century, an Englishwoman called named Sarah Sands née Walker lived on Block Island. Sands is known for being New England's first woman doctor and she has also been suggested to be an early abolitionist. She married sea captain James Sands (one of the original sixteen settlers, as recorded by Settler's Rock) in 1645 and had possibly six children, including a daughter named Mercy, born 1663. In 1699, Scottish sailor William Kidd visited Block Island shortly before he was hanged for piracy. At Block Island, he was supplied by Mercy Sands (then Mrs. Raymond). The story has it that, for her hospitality, Kidd bade Mrs. Raymond to hold out her apron, into which he threw gold and jewels until it was full. After her husband Joshua Raymond died, Mercy moved with her family to what would become the Raymond-Bradford Homestead in northern New London, Connecticut (later Montville) where she bought much land. The Raymond family was thus said to have been "enriched by the apron".

Block Island was incorporated by the Rhode Island general assembly in 1672, and the island government adopted the name "New Shoreham".

=== Post-colonial period ===
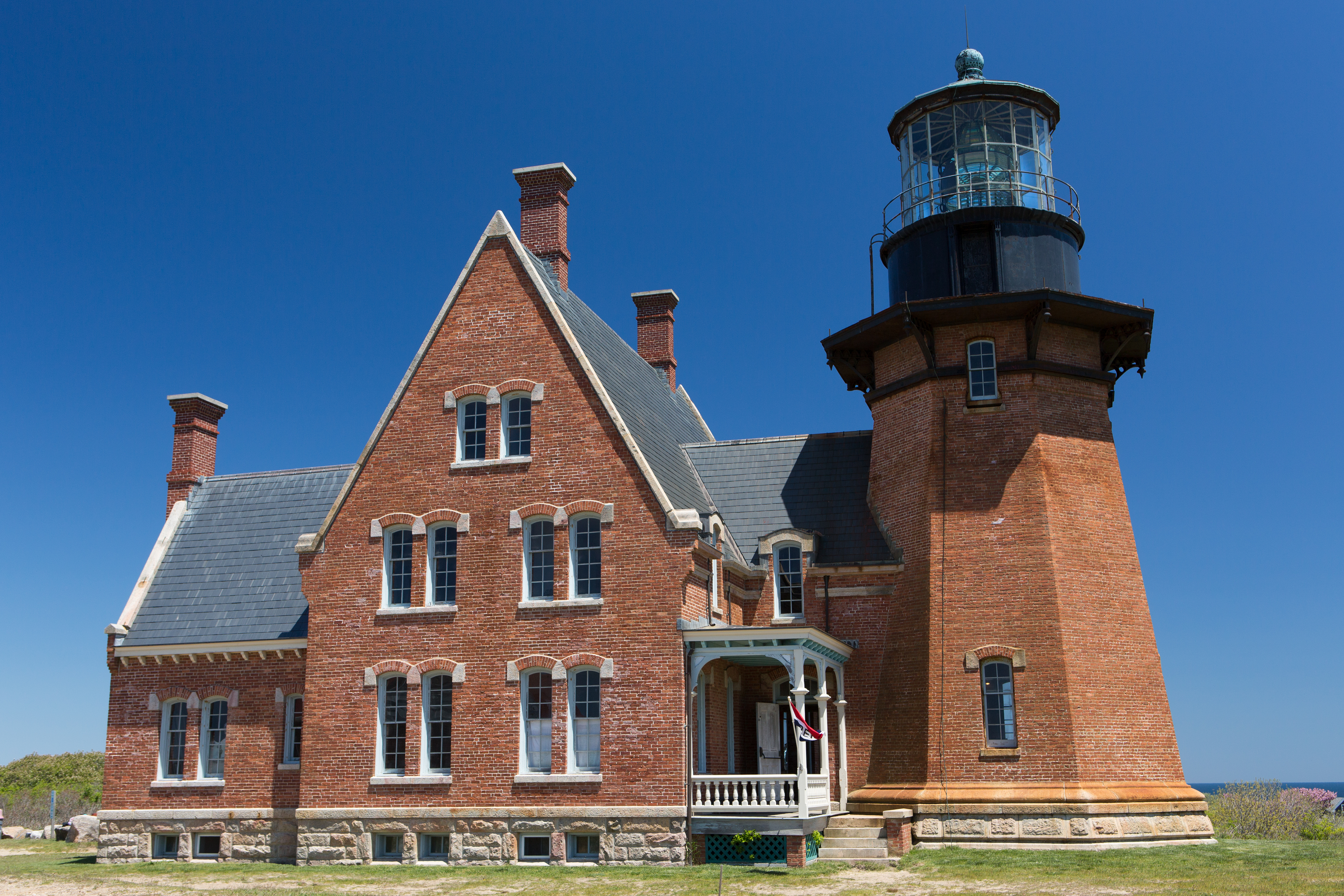
The Block Island Southeast Light

During the War of 1812, Block Island was briefly occupied by a Royal Navy squadron under the command of Captain Sir Thomas Hardy in 1814. The occupying squadron consisted of the ship of the line HMS Ramillies, frigate HMS Pactolus, brig-sloops HMS Despatch and HMS Nimrod and bomb vessel HMS Terror. Hardy had taken his squadron to Block Island in search of food and to establish a strategic position at the mouth of the Long Island Sound, but discovered that nearly all of the island's livestock and food stores had already been transferred to Stonington, Connecticut. On August 9, 1814, Hardy's squadron departed Block Island for Stonington in part to capture the transferred food stores and livestock, but his pre-dawn raid on the town a day later was repulsed in the Battle of Stonington.

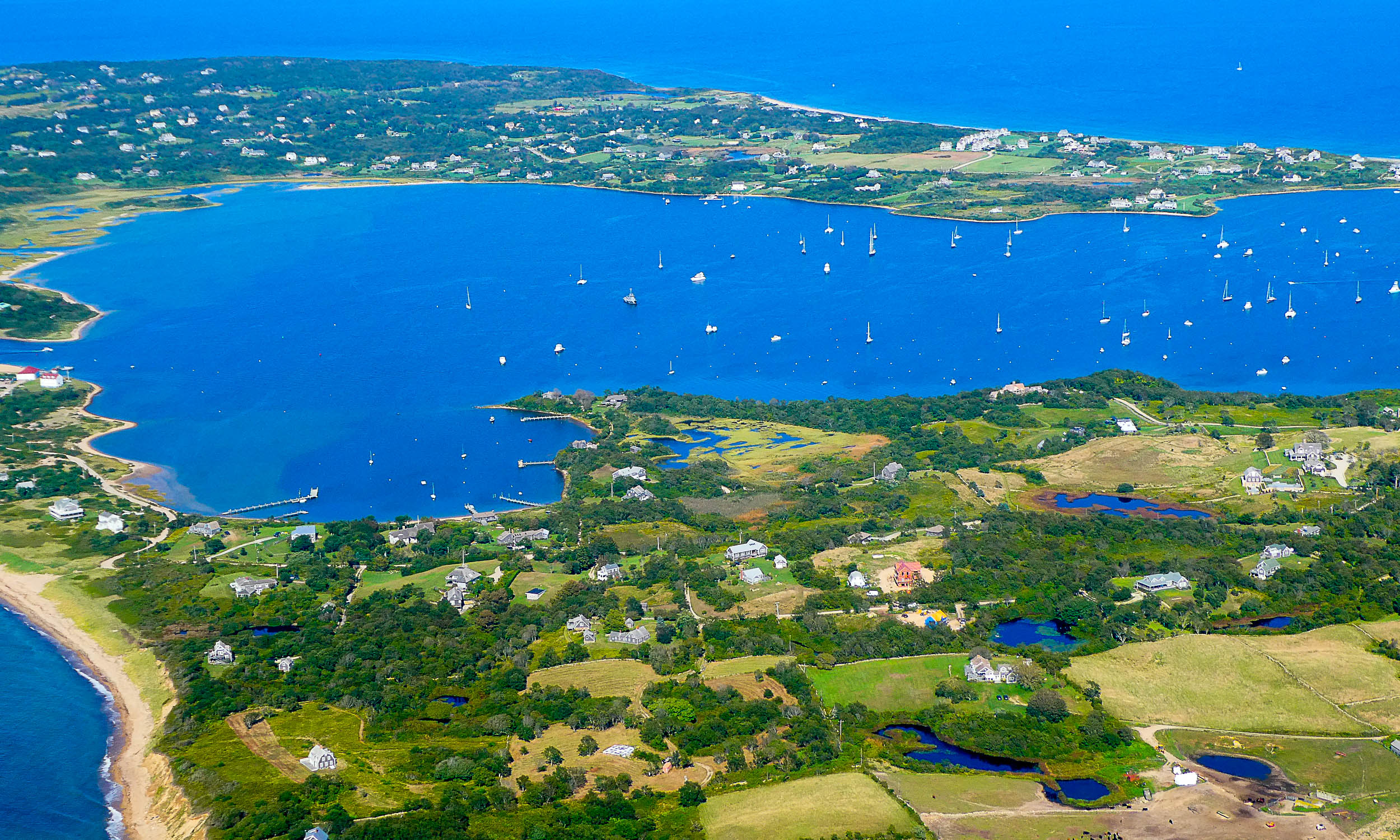
New Harbor - The Great Salt Pond

The original North Lighthouse was built in 1829, but it was replaced in 1836 after the original was washed out to sea. The ocean claimed the replacement lighthouse also, and the lighthouse that can be seen today was constructed in 1867. Construction began on Block Island's Southeast Lighthouse a few years later in 1873. Block Island has no natural harbors; breakwaters were constructed in 1870 to form Old Harbor. New Harbor was created in 1895 when a channel was dug to connect the Great Salt Pond to the ocean through the northwestern side of the island. The Island Free Library was established in 1874 and is Block Island's only public library.

Isaac Church was the island’s last recorded full-blooded Manisses Indian; he died in 1886 at age 100. He was survived by one son and one daughter whose descendants still reside in Rhode Island today. The landmark Isaac's Corner is named in honor of him, located at the intersection of Center Road, Lakeside Drive, and Cooneymus Road. Isaac is buried to the east of the four corners in the Historical Indian Burial Ground. In 2011, the Block Island Historical Society dedicated the Block Island Manissean Ancestral Stone. In attendance at the unveiling ceremony were descendants of the Manisses Indians, with Tiondra White Rapids Martinez, a direct descendant of Isaac Church, opening the ceremony in their native tongue.

During World War II, several artillery spotters were located on the island to direct fire from the heavy gun batteries at Fort Greene in Point Judith which protected the entrance to Narragansett Bay. Lookout positions for the spotters were built to look like houses. The US government offered to evacuate the island, as it could not be effectively defended from enemy invasion, but the islanders chose to stay. Days before the war ended against Germany, the Battle of Point Judith took place seven miles to the northeast of the island.

In 1963, the island was transferred from Newport County to Washington County.

On August 10, 2012, a tornadic waterspout formed to the south of the island. It went north and moved onshore Block Island at around 3:54 PM. It then tore through the island, before dissipating on the island's northern half. It was rated an EF0, and no deaths or injuries were reported.

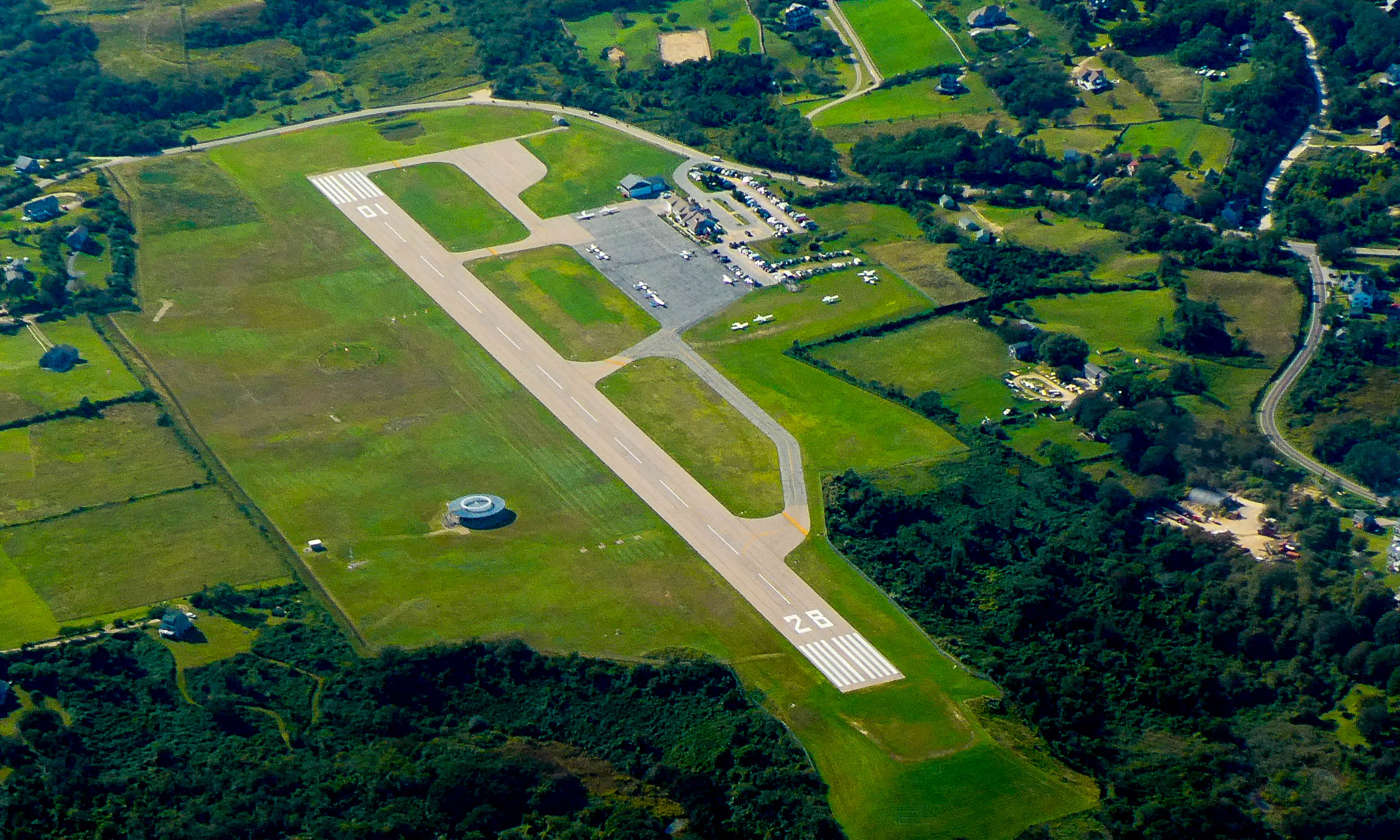
The Block Island State Airport

The island's airport (KBID) was opened in 1950 and remains open today as a general aviation airport. In 1972, the Block Island Conservancy was founded. The Conservancy and other environmental organizations are responsible for protecting over 40% of the island from development. In 1974, Old Harbor Historic District was declared a National Register historic district. More information can be found in the following books concerning Block Island's old buildings, islanders, history, and ongoing efforts to conserve the land, together with a collection of 800 period photographs of the island spanning the 1870s to the 1980s and all by historian Robert M. Downie:

- Block Island—The Sea
- Block Island—The Land
- The Block Island History of Photography, 2 volumes

The students of New Shoreham in grades kindergarten through 12th grade attend Block Island School. Harbor Church was founded on October 23, 1765, and is located at 21 Water Street.

== Climate ==
Block Island

Climate chart (precipitation, max. and min. temperature)
J	F	M	A	M	J	J	A	S	O	N	D
4.1 39 24	3.6 40 26	5.1 46 31	3.9 55 39	3.5 64 48	3.8 73 58	3 79 63	4.2 78 63	4.1 72 57	4.8 63 47	3.7 53 39	4.6 44 30
- █ Average max. and min. temperatures in °F
- █ Precipitation totals in inches
Metric conversion
J	F	M	A	M	J	J	A	S	O	N	D
104 4 −4	91 4 −3	130 8 −1	99 13 4	89 18 9	97 23 14	76 26 17	107 26 17	104 22 14	122 17 8	94 12 4	117 7 −1
- █ Average max. and min. temperatures in °C
- █ Precipitation totals in mm

Block Island's weather is greatly influenced by the surrounding ocean. The climate is oceanic (Köppen Cfb), bordering a humid continental (Dfa/Dfb) and humid subtropical climate (Cfa). The ocean stays cool during the winter and spring months, but remains warm enough that average temperatures are several degrees warmer than inland areas of Rhode Island. In summer, while the ocean warms to near 70 F, it still keeps Block Island cooler than locations inland. As such, Block Island has a frost free season longer than locations inland. Block Island averages 2300 hrs of sunshine annually (higher than the USA average).

Block Island's record high temperature is 95 °F (35 °C) on August 26 and 27, 1948, and the record low is −7 °F (−22 °C) on January 16, 1994. The lowest high temperature on record was 8 °F (−13 °C) on December 31, 1962, and January 8, 1968, and the highest low temperature on record was 76 °F (24 °C) on August 2, 1979. The hardiness zone is now 7b.

Climate data for Block Island, Rhode Island, 1981–2010 normals, extremes 1948–present
Month	Jan	Feb	Mar	Apr	May	Jun	Jul	Aug	Sep	Oct	Nov	Dec	Year
Record high °F (°C)	62 (17)	62 (17)	74 (23)	84 (29)	85 (29)	90 (32)	92 (33)	95 (35)	87 (31)	80 (27)	72 (22)	64 (18)	95 (35)
Mean daily maximum °F (°C)	39.8 (4.3)	40.9 (4.9)	45.6 (7.6)	54.6 (12.6)	63.2 (17.3)	73.0 (22.8)	77.9 (25.5)	77.6 (25.3)	72.6 (22.6)	63.0 (17.2)	54.3 (12.4)	45.2 (7.3)	59.0 (15.0)
Daily mean °F (°C)	32.6 (0.3)	33.7 (0.9)	38.2 (3.4)	46.7 (8.2)	55.1 (12.8)	64.8 (18.2)	70.2 (21.2)	70.0 (21.1)	64.7 (18.2)	55.5 (13.1)	47.4 (8.6)	37.6 (3.1)	51.4 (10.8)
Mean daily minimum °F (°C)	25.4 (−3.7)	26.6 (−3.0)	30.7 (−0.7)	38.8 (3.8)	47.1 (8.4)	56.5 (13.6)	62.5 (16.9)	62.4 (16.9)	56.9 (13.8)	48.1 (8.9)	40.5 (4.7)	30.0 (−1.1)	43.8 (6.5)
Record low °F (°C)	−7 (−22)	−2 (−19)	7 (−14)	18 (−8)	34 (1)	41 (5)	51 (11)	45 (7)	39 (4)	28 (−2)	16 (−9)	−4 (−20)	−7 (−22)
Average precipitation inches (mm)	4.12 (105)	3.61 (92)	5.12 (130)	3.89 (99)	3.53 (90)	3.78 (96)	2.96 (75)	4.20 (107)	4.06 (103)	4.77 (121)	3.74 (95)	4.62 (117)	48.40 (1,229)
Average precipitation days (≥ 0.01 in)	7.9	7.7	9.7	9.9	9.8	7.4	6.2	6.2	6.5	7.9	8.8	9.1	97.1
Source 1: NOAA (precip 1991–2020, precip days 1981–2020)
Source 2: National Weather Service

== Demographics ==
Historical population
Census	Pop.	Note	%±
1970	489		—
1980	620		26.8%
1990	836		34.8%
2000	1,010		20.8%
2010	1,051		4.1%
2020	1,410		34.2%

The population of New Shoreham was 1,410 at the 2020 census, making it the least-populous municipality in the state. The population density was 155.3 inhabitants per square mile (59.96/km^{2}). There were 1,818 housing units in the town. The racial makeup of the town was 90.43% White, 1.21% African American, 0.50% Native American, 0.35% Asian, 0.00% Pacific Islander, 3.90% from other races, and 3.62% from two or more races. Hispanic or Latino of any race were 4.68% of the population.

There were 393 households in the town, of which 12.5% had children under the age of 18 living with them, 45.5% were married couples living together, 35.2% had a female householder with no spouse present, and 18.1% had a male householder with no spouse present. 12.5% of households were one person and 8.7% were one person aged 65 or older. The average household size was 2.01 and the average family size was 2.52.

The age distribution was 10.6% under the age of 18, 12.8% from 18 to 24, 19.9% from 25 to 44, 21.0% from 45 to 64, and 35.7% 65 or older. The median age was 51 years.

The median household income was $72,450 and the median family income was $98,237. About 10.1% of the population were below the poverty line, including 4.5% of those under age 18 and 6.1% of those age 65 or over.

== Arts and culture ==
=== Annual events ===
One of the most popular celebrations on the island is the Fourth of July Parade. Anybody can enter a float into the parade, as long as it coordinates with the theme of that respective year. For example, the theme in 2016 was sports and recreation. In addition to the parade, there is a fireworks display on the beach on the night of July 3. The parade is on the fourth and is judged by officials who award prizes in three categories: family floats, company floats, and overall floats. They also give out one extra prize for the overall category which is the grand prize, consisting of $500.

Every summer, the island hosts Block Island Race Week, a competitive, week-long sailboat race. In odd years, the event is held by the Storm Trysail Club, and on even years by the Block Island Race Week. Yachts compete in various classes, sailing courses in Block Island Sound and circumnavigating the island.

Every year, the island also hosts the Block Island Film Festival, an international film festival established in 2018 by journalist and filmmaker Cassius Shuman. The festival aims to promote independent works from local and international filmmakers, showcasing motion pictures, documentaries, short films and student short films.

Block Island Pride is a pride celebration held every summer, that commemorates and supports the LGBTQ+ community. The event features a variety of activities, including parades, live performances, and educational workshops, promoting inclusivity and diversity on the island.

=== Tourist attractions ===
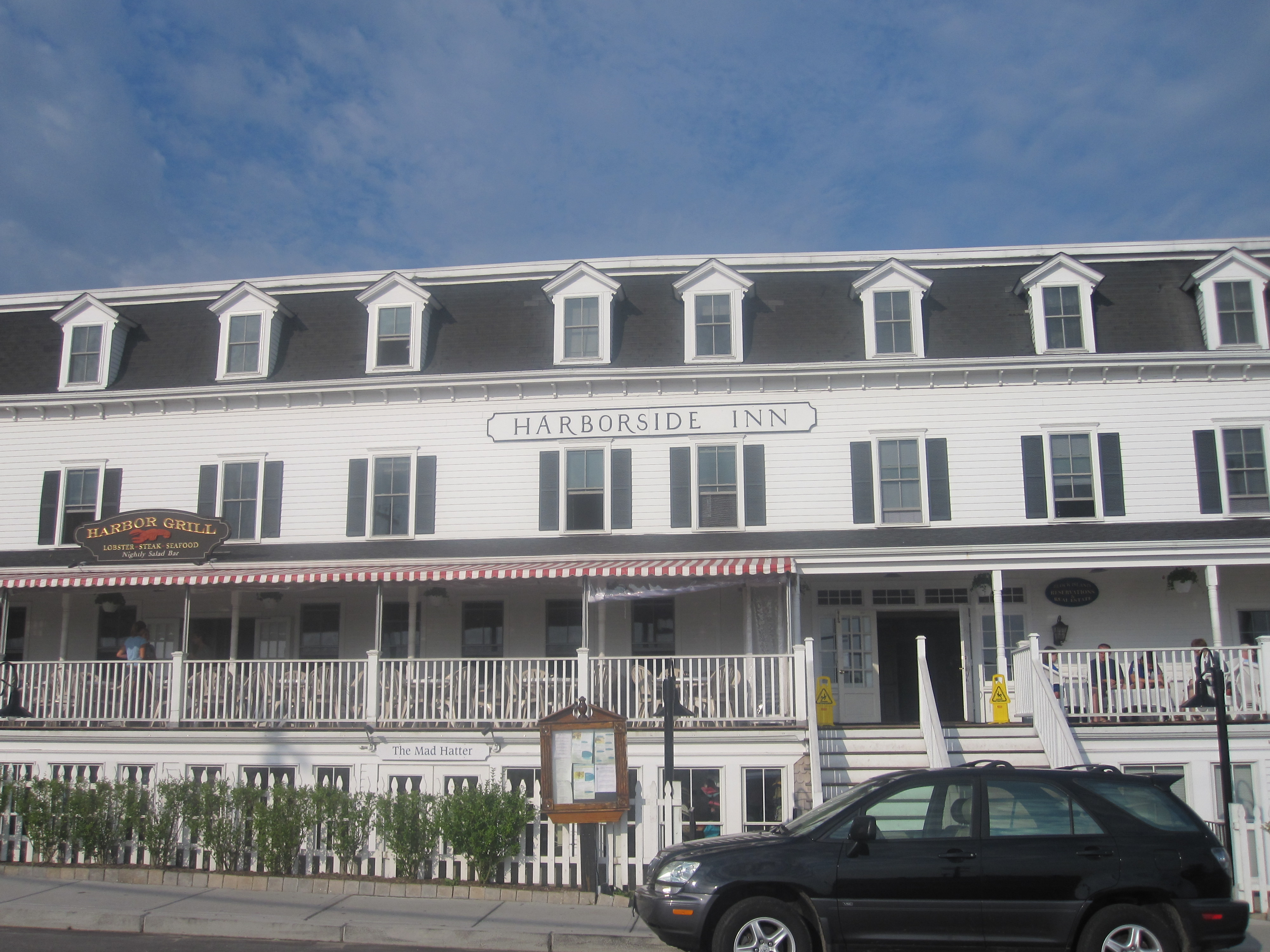
Harborside Inn was a restaurant and hotel on the south side of Block Island. It burned down in August 2023.

Southeast Lighthouse is located at the southeast corner of the island on the Mohegan Trail. The lighthouse was constructed in 1875 and remains to this day an active US Coast Guard navigational aid. The lighthouse was moved in 1993, in danger of falling off the bluffs due to erosion. In addition to offering tours of the tower, the lighthouse has a museum that is open during the summer season.

The Mohegan Bluffs are located a short distance to the west of Southeast Lighthouse. The bluffs are the site of a pre-colonial battle between the invading Mohegan and the native Niantic, in which the Mohegan were driven off the edge of the tall cliffs to their deaths on the beach below. A staircase of 141 steps leads to the bottom of these clay cliffs and looks out over the Atlantic. On clear days, Montauk, New York, can be seen in the distance from the southern and western sides of the island.

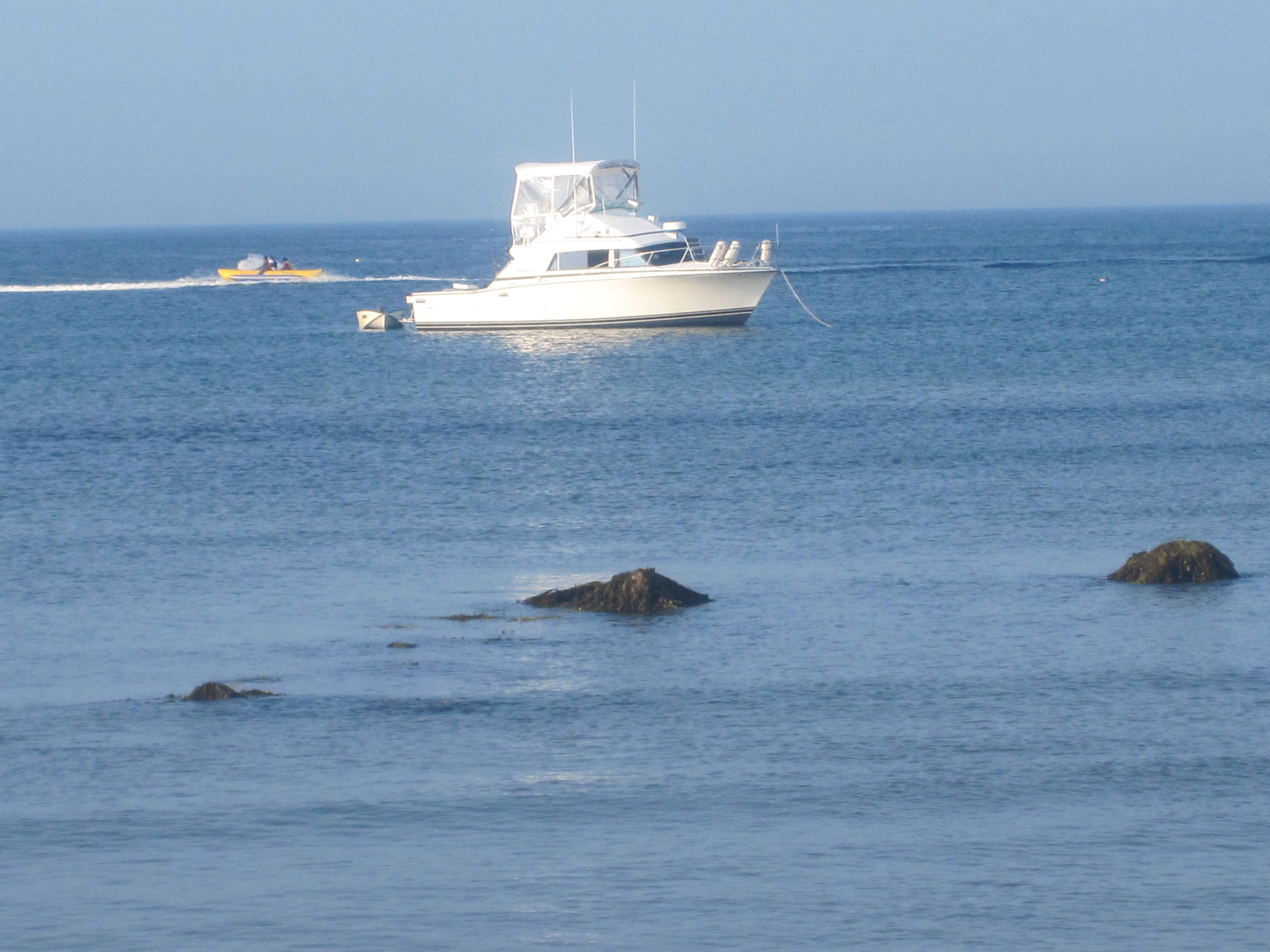
Boating is popular around Block Island

Rodman's Hollow is a 230-acre (93 ha) glacial outwash basin, near the southern shore of the island. The hollow has several walking trails.

North Lighthouse is located at Sandy Point on the northern tip of Block Island. The North Lighthouse warns boaters of a sandbar extending from this end of the island. The surrounding dunes are part of the Block Island National Wildlife Refuge, home to many species, including the piping plover and American burying beetle. A short walk away from the North Lighthouse lies the tip of the island, with ocean on both sides of a thin strip of land.

The Block Island Historical Society Museum is located near the downtown area and contains a broad array of Block Island artifacts.

U-853 is a U-boat wreck 7 miles (11 km) east of the island, lying in 130 ft (40 m) of water. Recreational divers frequently visit the wreck, though at least three have died there.

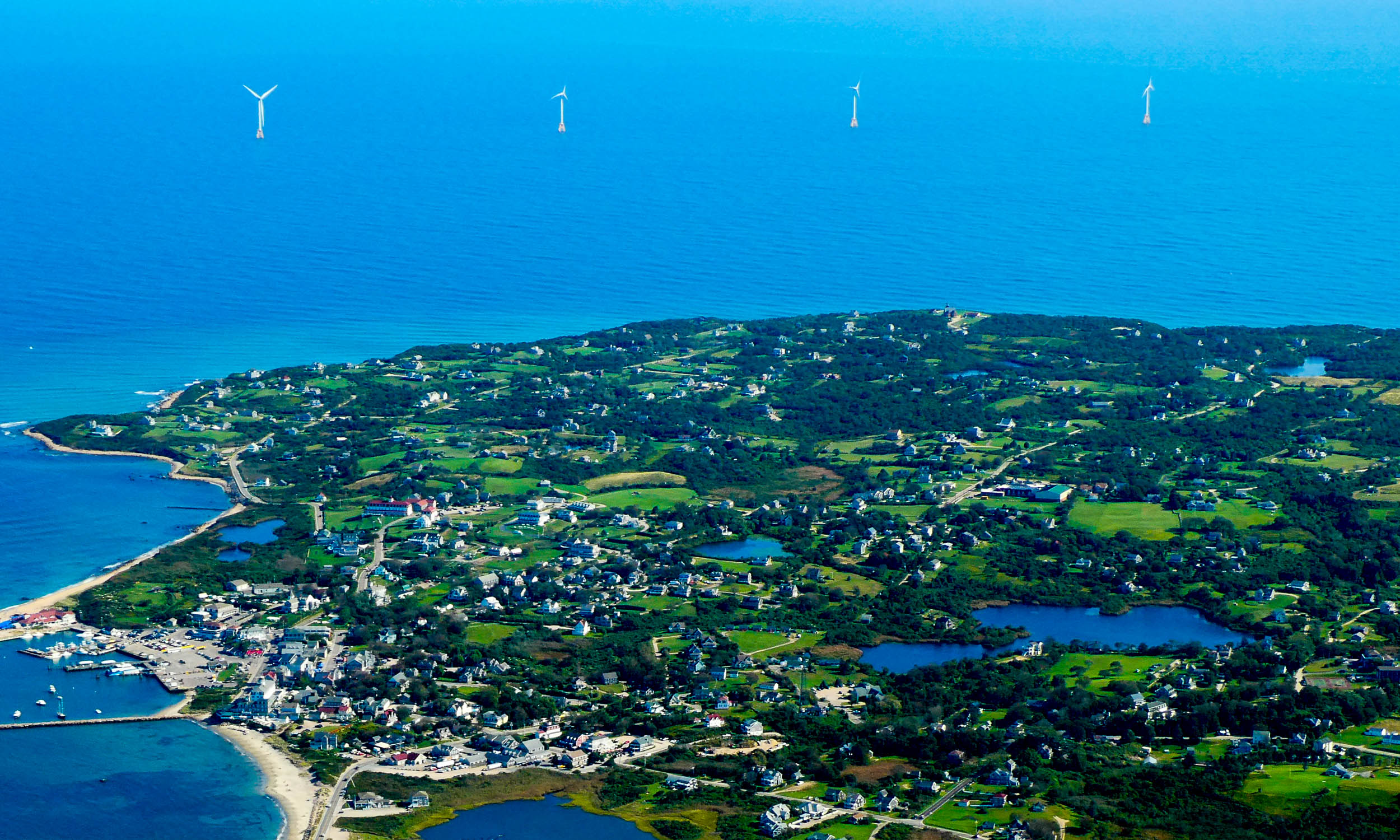
Offshore Wind Turbines, Block Island

The Block Island Wind Farm, the first offshore wind farm built in the United States, is located 3 miles (4.8 km) from south-east of the island. The five turbines, each 600 ft (180 m) high, commenced commercial operation in December 2016.

The island has at least 40 restaurants, but most are closed outside of tourist season; mainland restaurants use New England Airlines to deliver food to the island.

== Parks and recreation ==
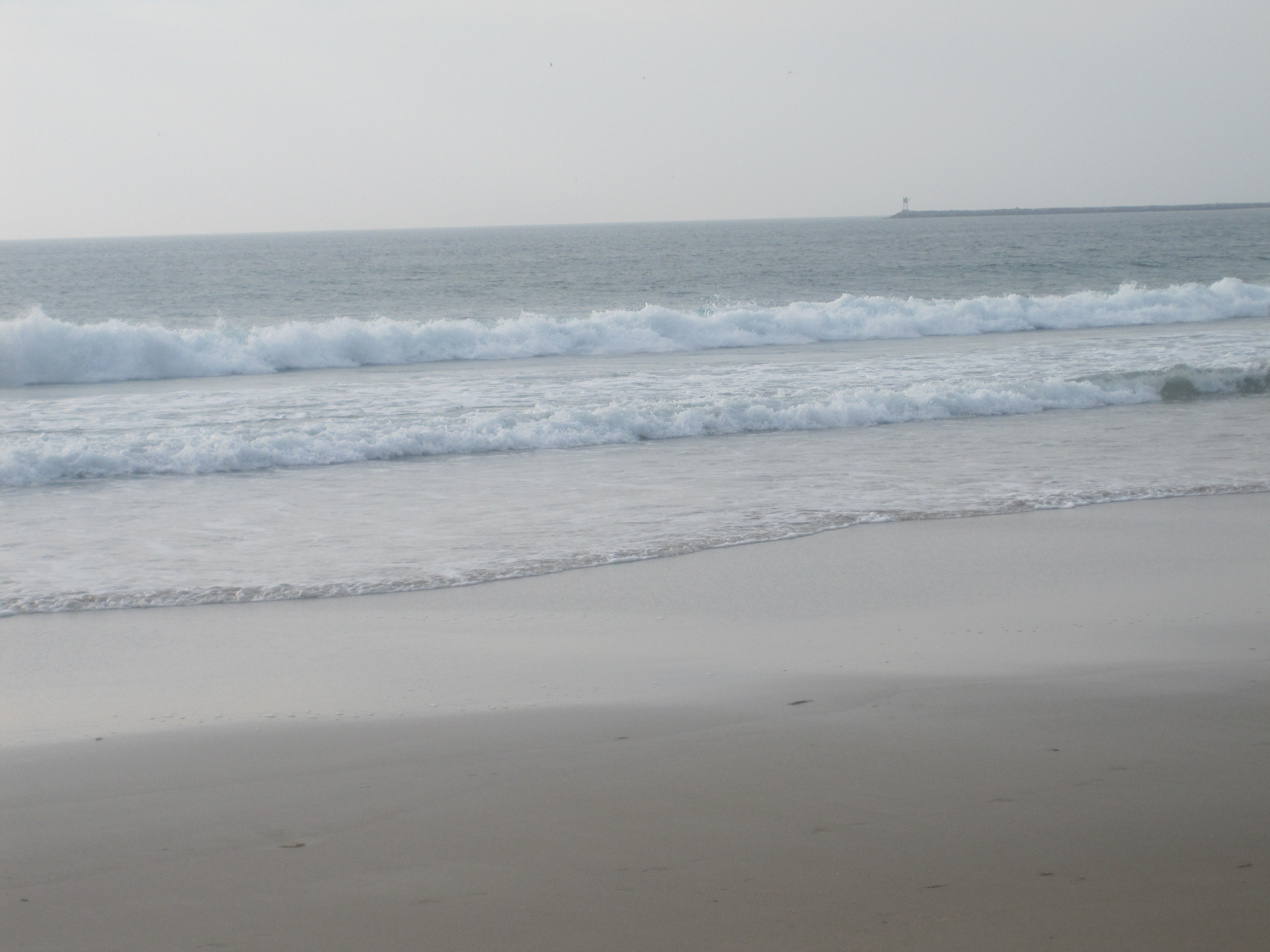
Beach waves near the National Hotel on Block Island

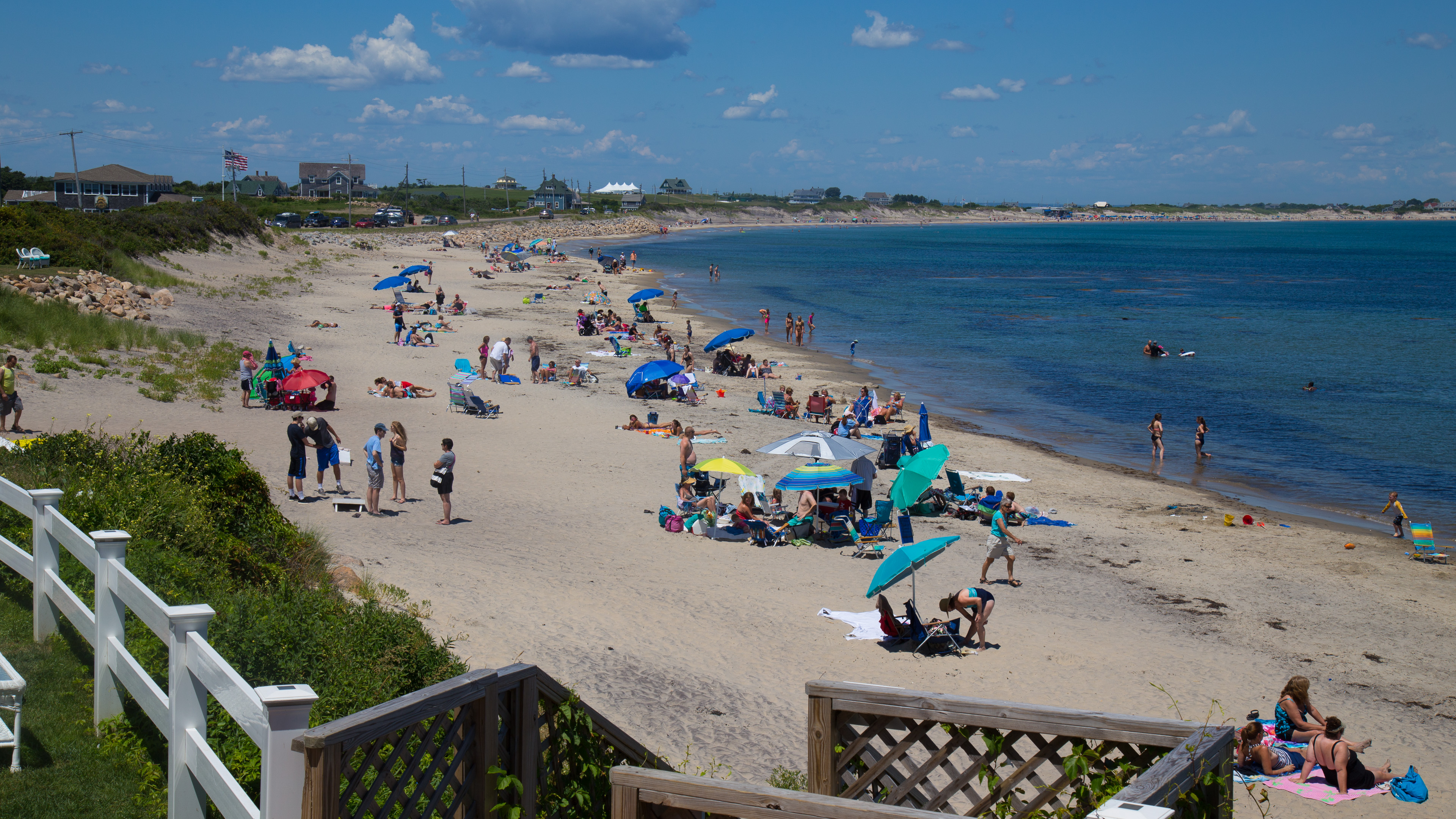
Crescent Beach on Block Island July, 2015

There are 17 miles of beach on Block Island. Crescent Beach can be viewed from the Pt. Judith Ferry and the New London Express Ferry on the way to the island. It contains five smaller beaches: Fred Benson Town Beach (popularly known as State Beach), Surf Beach, Scotch Beach, Rouse's Beach, and Mansion Beach, all of which are located on Corn Neck Road. North of Mansion Beach are Clayhead and Pots & Kettles. Clayhead is a set of cliffs which can be seen from the ferry in from Point Judith or New London. This area is rocky and contains iron-rich clay deposits, and is a popular area for shell and rock hunting.

Cow Cove, Settler's Rock, and Sandy Point make up the northernmost point of Block Island where the North Lighthouse is located. Settler's Rock is located at Cow Cove, where the settlers landed and swam to shore bringing with them the island's first cows, which they pushed off the boats and forced ashore. Attached to the rock is a plaque naming the original settlers of Block Island. Coastguard Beach (or "the channel") is situated between the Great Salt Pond and the ocean on the north west side of the island. Ballard's Beach is on the south side of the Block Island Ferry Dock and jetty. Bluffs Beach (or Vail) is set at the bottom of Mohegan Bluffs.

The west and south sides are known for the surf especially in autumn. Black Rock Beach and Town Beach have the best surf conditions. Dorie's Cove and Grace's Cove also produce ridable waves.

Block Island also hosts an office of The Nature Conservancy. The Conservancy named Block Island as one of its top 12 sites in the Western Hemisphere, and a large portion of the island is legally protected and set aside for conservation.

== Industry ==
The island is known for participating in the commercial aquaculture and kelp farming sectors.

As of 2012 the only power plant in the state entirely reliant on oil fuel was the one on Block Island.

== Transportation ==
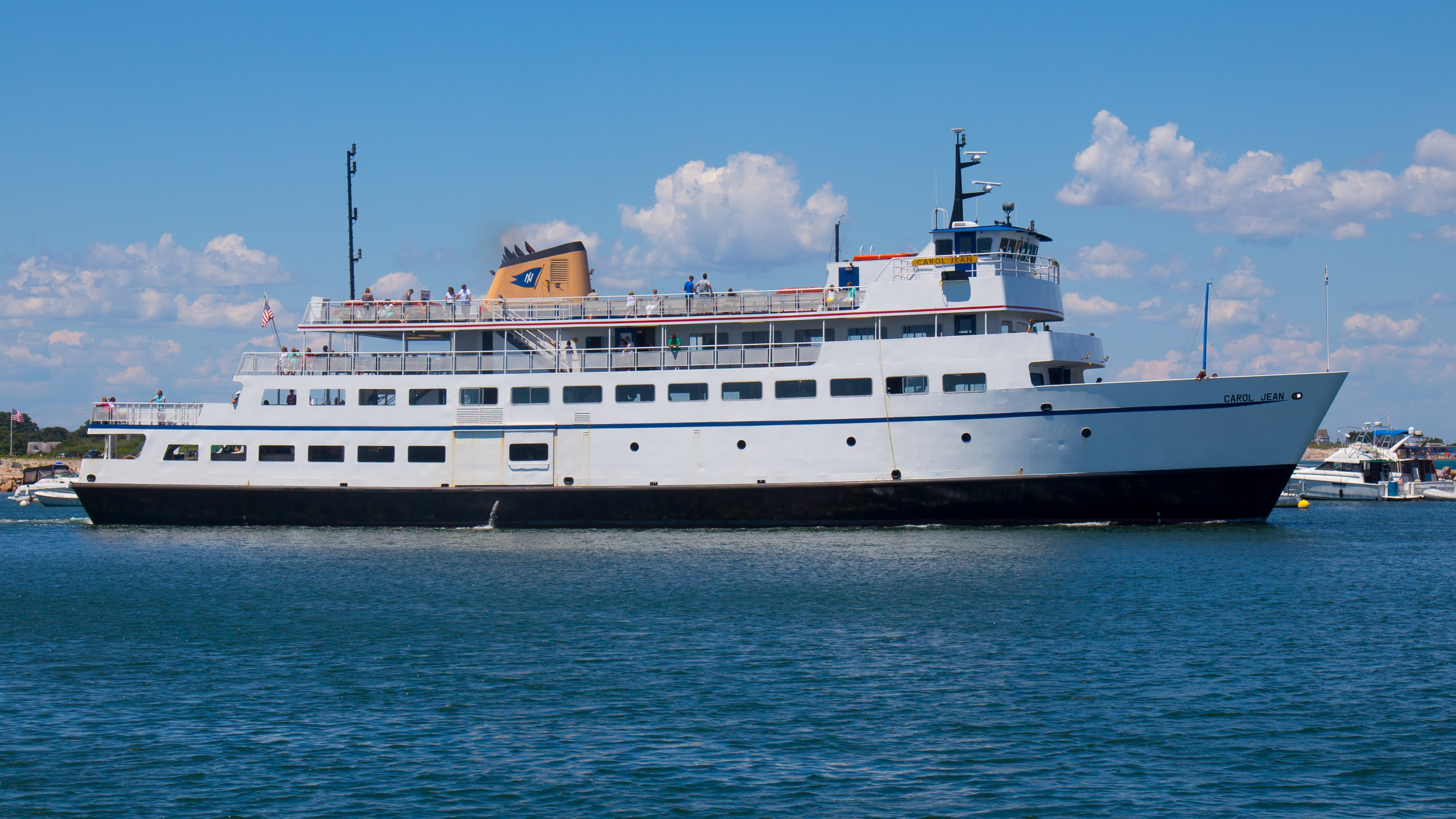
Ferryboat Carol Jean departing Block Island in July 2015

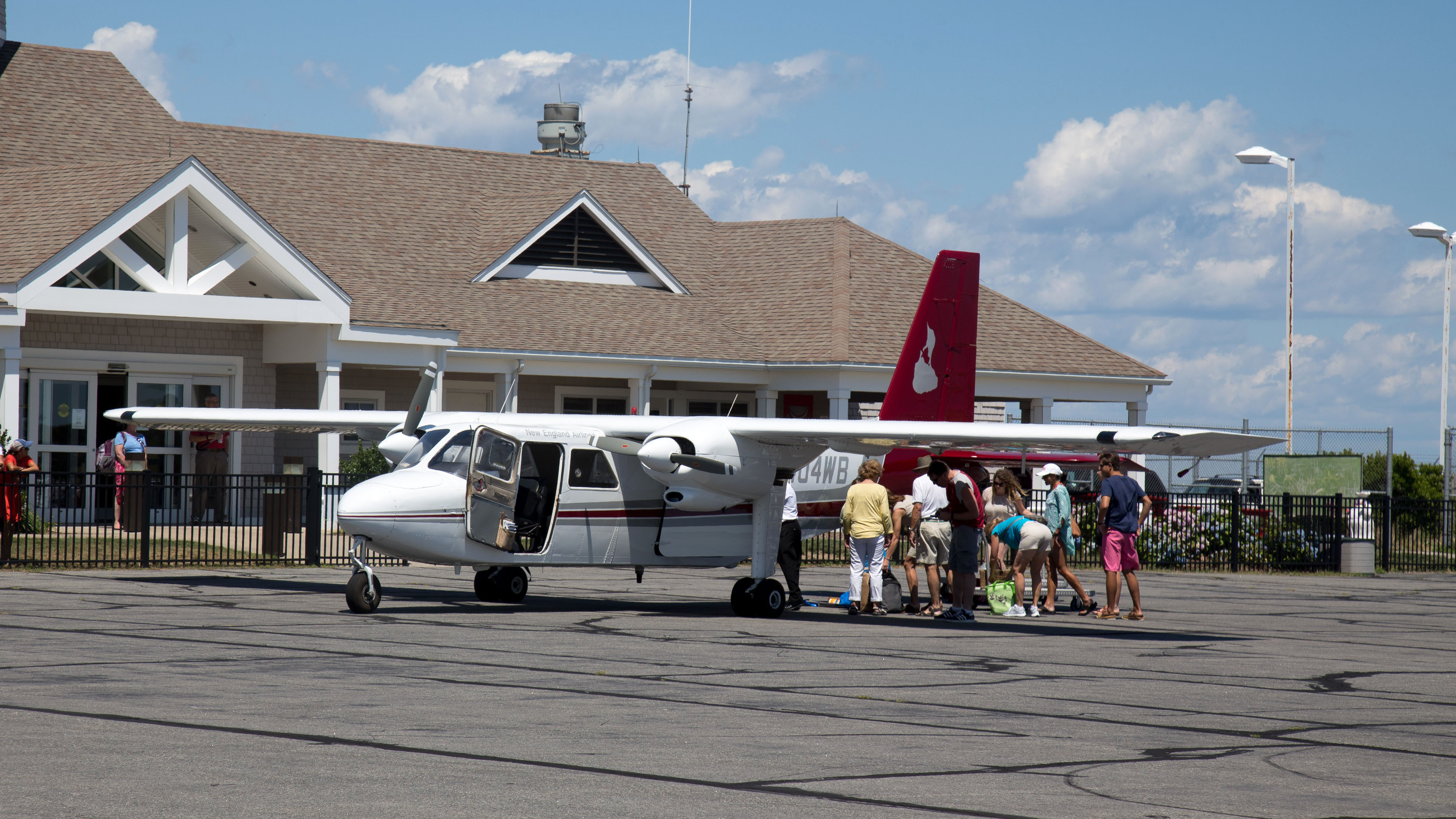
New England Airlines Britten-Norman Islander at Block Island

The island is connected year-round by a ferry to Point Judith, and in summer to New London, Connecticut; Orient and Montauk, New York; and Newport, Rhode Island. The traditional ferry takes about an hour to reach the island from Point Judith and is the only way to bring a car to the island as it is able to carry them. A high-speed ferry on the same route takes 35 minutes but cannot take cars, and another high-speed ferry from New London takes just over an hour.

Bikes are a popular form of transportation on the island, as cars are generally discouraged. Additionally, mopeds are quite popular, especially with tourists, since they are easy to rent and drive. This popularity has led to over six moped rental shops on the island, but the same popularity and ease of use has led to many incidents over 40 years with reckless or bad drivers, meaning that moped accidents are a common problem on the island.

New England Airlines offers regularly scheduled 12-minute flights to Block Island State Airport from Westerly, Rhode Island. The island airport is officially called Block Island State (code: BID) and the terminal is about one mile from the town center.

== Incidents ==
=== Air crashes ===
On August 26, 1995, a Cessna 185 seaplane carrying four people crashed while attempting to land in the waters off Old Harbor Beach, an area not normally used for seaplane landings. The plane cleared a dune but hit a power line, causing it to crash into a restaurant and hit a car at the island's only gas station. All four people on the plane died, as well as a woman who was sitting in her car as it was being fueled. The restaurant was destroyed by the impact of the plane and resulting fire.

On July 5, 2006, a plane carrying three people crashed 1/2 mile (800 m) west of the airport during bad weather. The aircraft had just taken off and was on its way to White Plains, New York.

=== Shipwrecks ===
The area around Block Island has been the site of numerous shipwrecks, including the Steamer Larchmont in 1907. The 1738 wreck of the Princess Augusta (also known as the Palatine ship) was later immortalized by John Greenleaf Whittier in his 1867 poem "The Wreck of the Palatine". In 1877, the freighter Achilles struck a submerged rock off the island and ran aground. In 1992, the Cunard liner Queen Elizabeth 2 struck a submerged rock.

Two submarines also sank off Block Island: USS S-51 in 1925, and German submarine U-853 in 1945.

== Notable people ==
- Kenneth Bacon (1944–2009), Department of Defense spokesman who served as president of Refugees International
- Tad Devine (b. 1955), American political consultant. Senior adviser in Al Gore's 2000, John Kerry's 2004, and Bernie Sanders' 2016 presidential campaigns.
- Elizabeth Dickens (1877–1963), "the Bird Lady of Block Island", writer, and naturalist
- Richard Parsons (1948–2024), an American business executive, former chairman of Citigroup, and the former chairman and CEO of Time Warner.
- Jens Risom (1916–2016), Danish-American furniture designer
- William Stringfellow (1928–1985), attorney and radical Anglican theologian

== Gallery ==
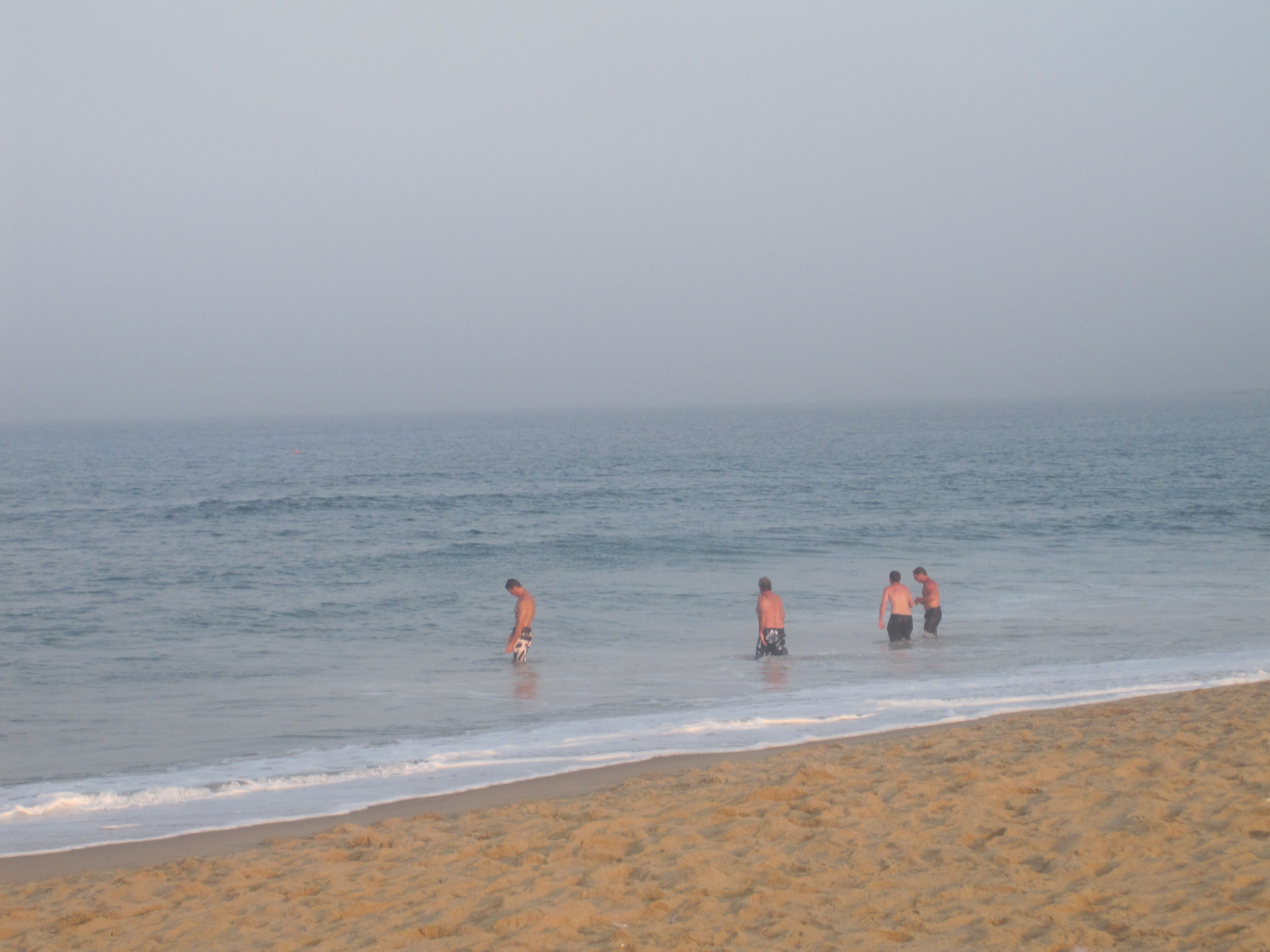
Swimmers in smooth waters at Block Island

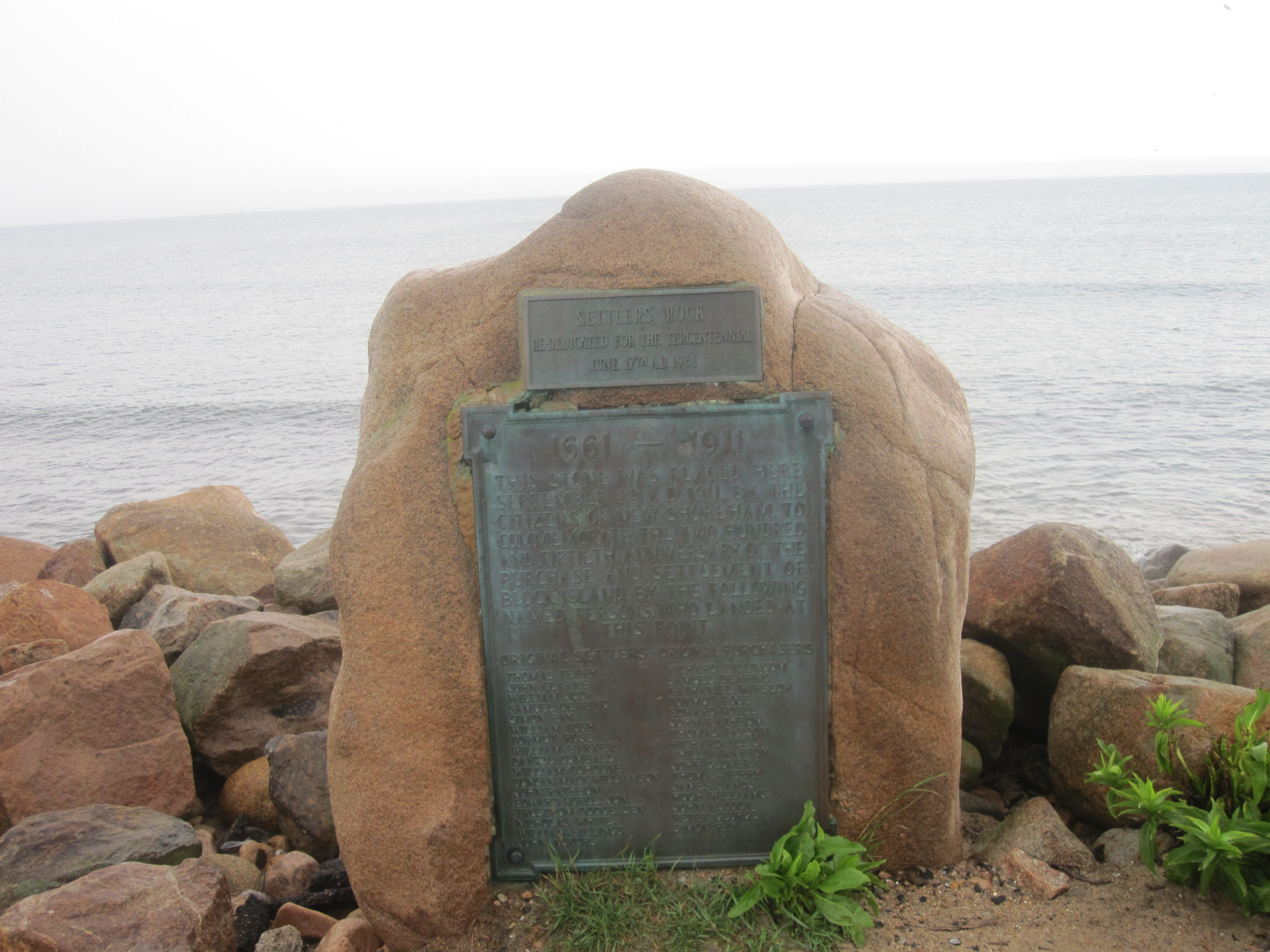
Settler's Rock is the most northerly part of Block Island accessible to motorists

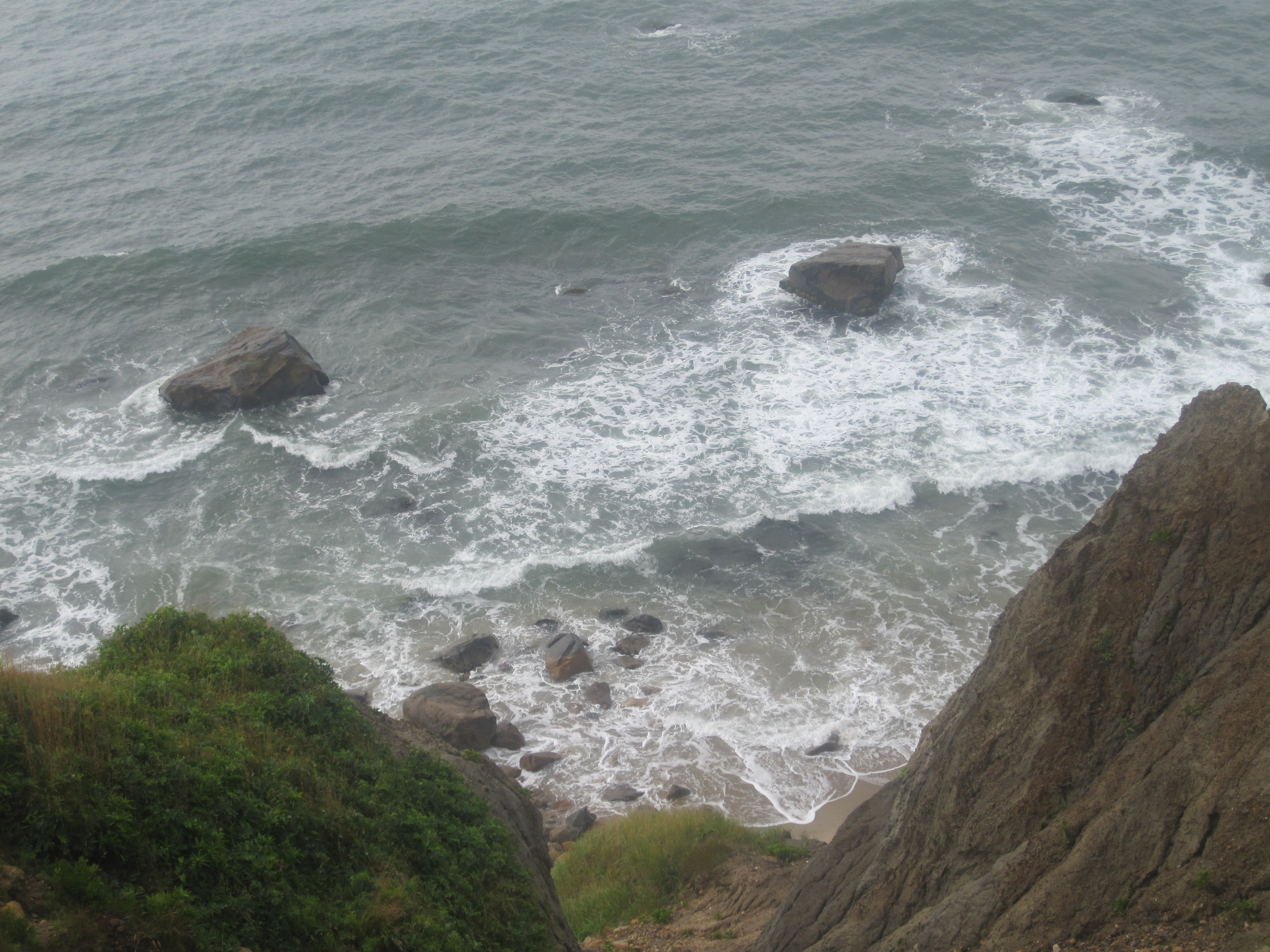
Steep bluffs at Block Island

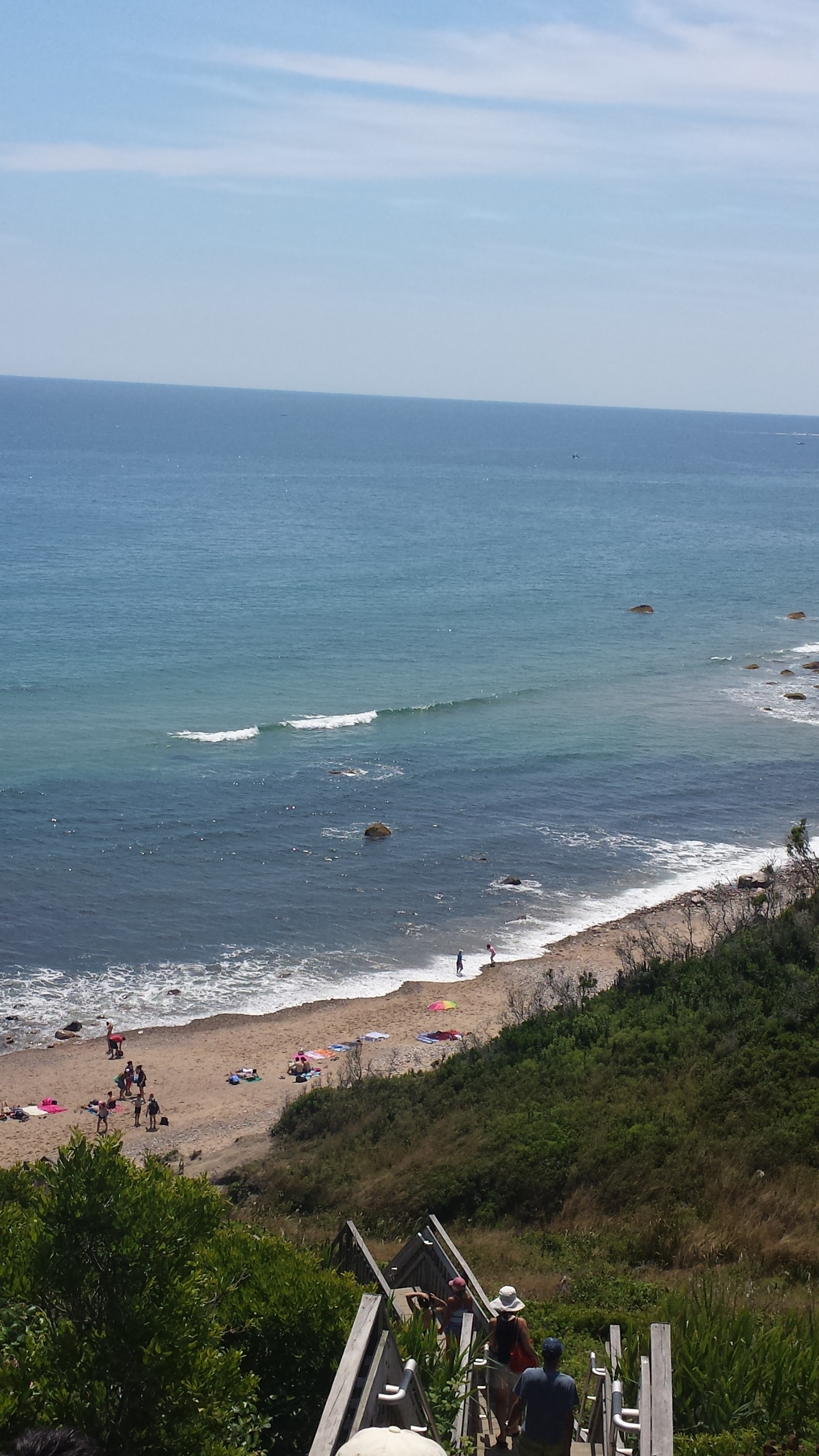
View of the Atlantic Ocean from a cliff on Block Island

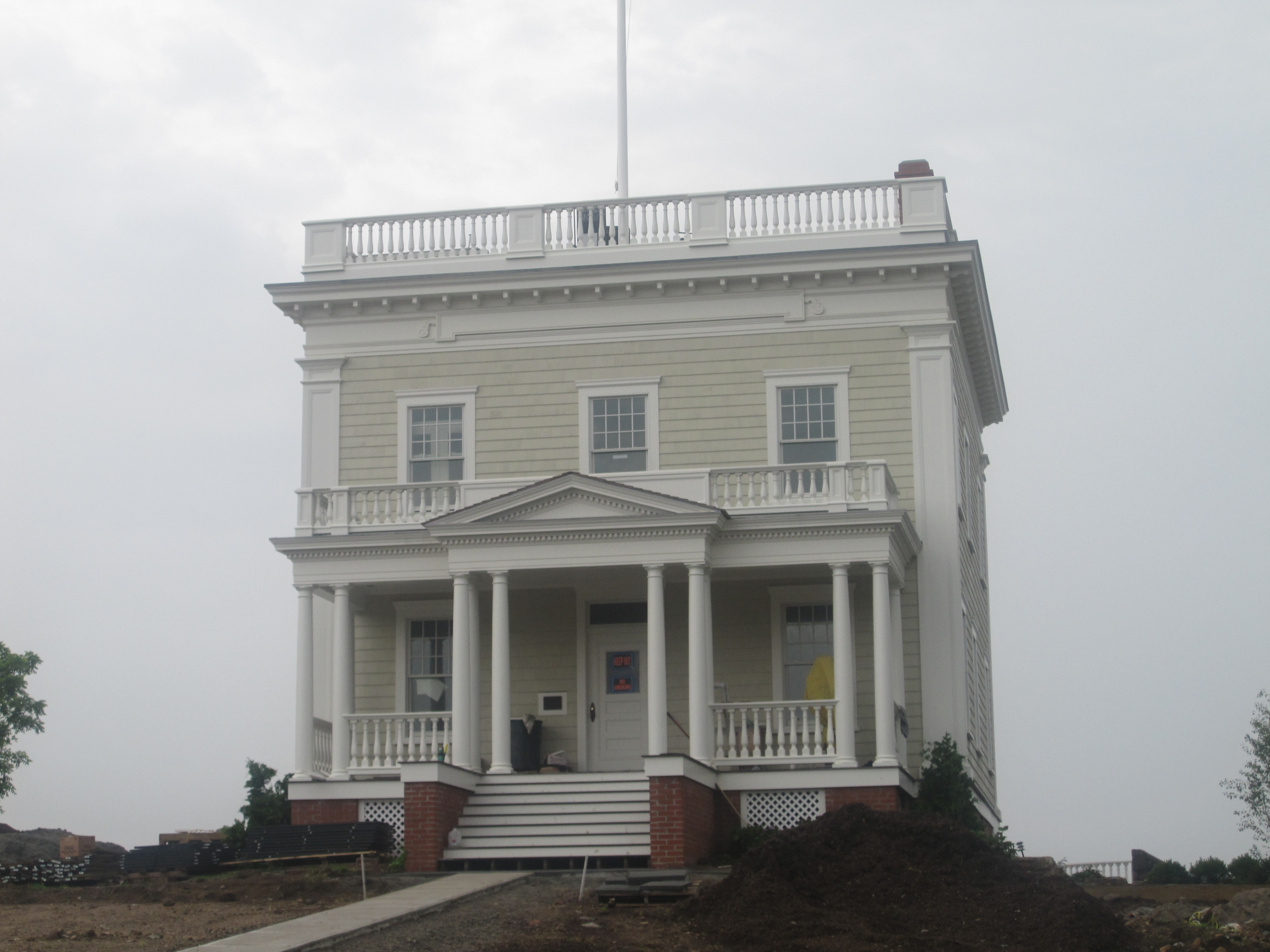
This house was formerly the US Weather Bureau Station on Block Island

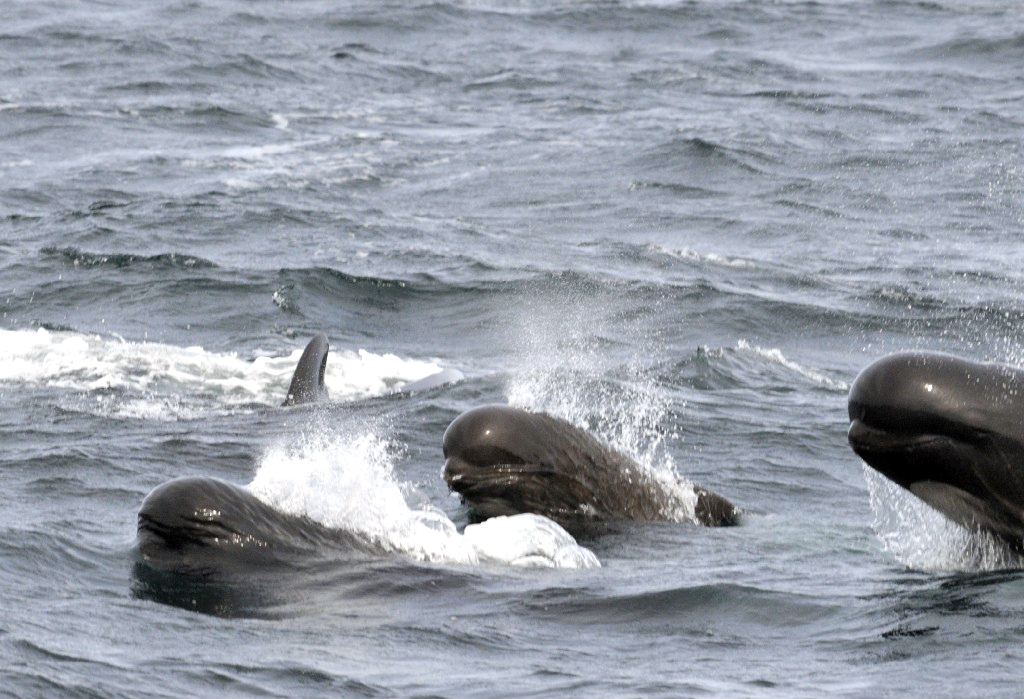
Long-finned Pilot Whales off southeast of Block Island

== See also ==
- Block Island Wind Farm
- Block Island Sound
- Palatine Light
- The Block Island Sound, 2020 film set and shot on Block Island
