= Mohegan Bluffs =

Clay cliffs in Rhode Island, US

Coordinates: 41.1523433°N 71.5546047°W

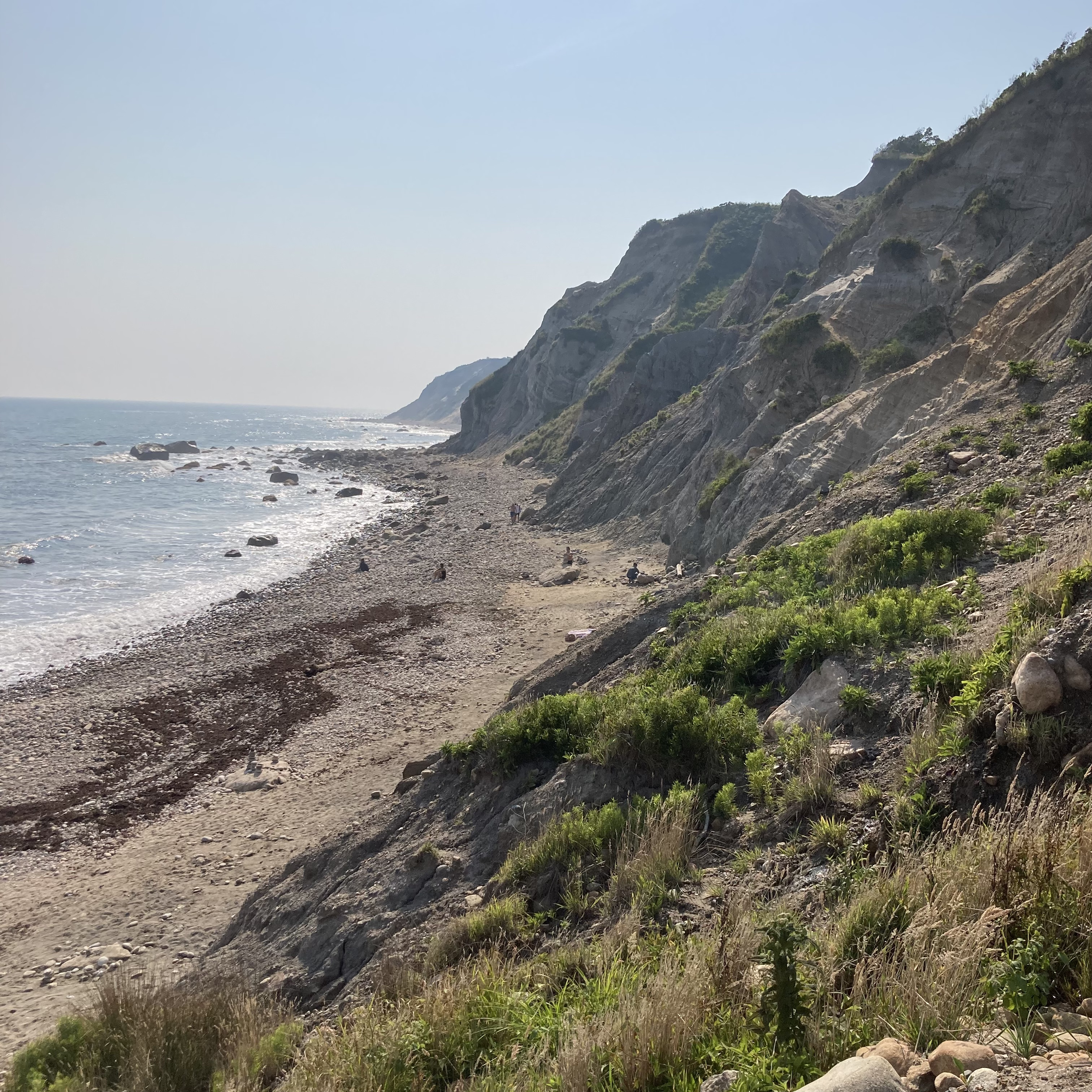
Mohegan Bluffs at Block Island

The Mohegan Bluffs are large clay cliffs about 150 feet (46 m) high, located on the southern shore of Block Island. They got their name because the battle of the Niantic and the Mohegan took place here in the mid 16th century. The battle was over supremacy of the island, and the Mohegans were forced over the cliffs to their death by the native Niantic.

These cliffs are a beautiful site, and can be observed from the top, where visitors can look out for miles on the Atlantic Ocean or visitors can climb down the steep staircase of over 100 steps and view them from the beach (also known as Corn Cove).

The visiting times are from a half-hour before sunrise to a half-hour after sunset. Visitors usually spend the day here tanning on the beach, swimming in the ocean, walking their dogs, or simply admiring the cliffs.

Through the years, the Mohegan Bluffs have eroded, receding about 250 feet (76 m), and because of this, the Block Island Southeast Lighthouse had to be moved back about 360 feet (110 m) to keep it from tumbling into the ocean.
