= Block Island Southeast Light =

Lighthouse in Rhode Island, United States

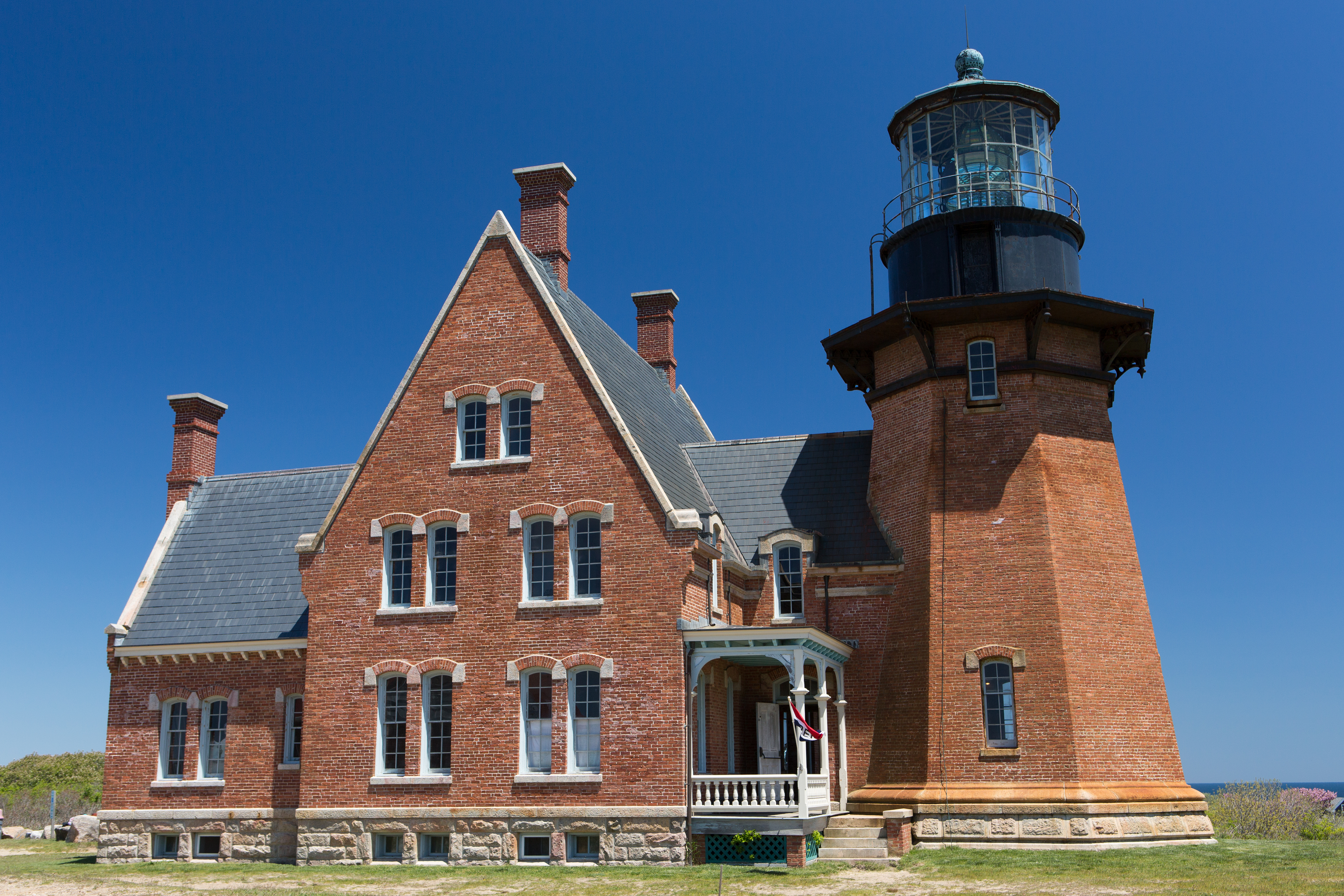
- The Block Island Southeast Light in May, 2015
- Location: South East Light Road, New Shoreham, Rhode Island
- Coordinates: 41°9′12.3″N 71°33′7.7″W

Tower
- Constructed: 1875
- Foundation: Granite / Concrete / Brick
- Construction: Red brick
- Automated: 1990
- Height: 52 feet (16 m)
- Shape: Octagonal pyramidal tower attached to dwelling
- Markings: Natural with black lantern
- Heritage: National Historic Landmark, National Register of Historic Places listed place, America's Most Endangered Places
- Fog signal: Horn, 1 every 30 sec

Light
- First lit: 1875
- Deactivated: 1990-1994
- Focal height: 261 feet (80 m)
- Lens: 1st order Fresnel lens
- Range: 20 nautical miles (37 km; 23 mi)
- Characteristic: Fl Green 5 sec
- Block Island South East Light
- U.S. National Register of Historic Places
- U.S. National Historic Landmark
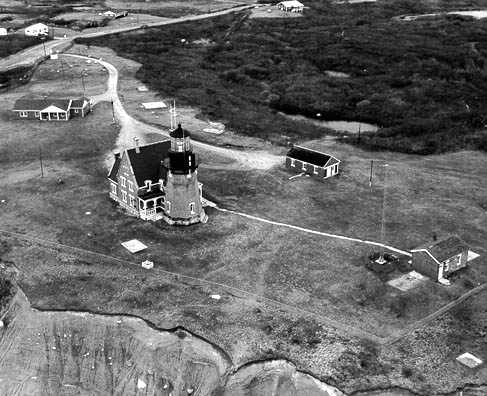
- Architect: US Light House Board; Tynan, T.H.
- Architectural style: Gothic
- NRHP reference No.: 90001131 (NRHP); 97001264 (NHL)

Significant dates
- Added to NRHP: August 6, 1990
- Designated NHL: September 24, 1997

Block Island Southeast Light is a lighthouse located on Mohegan Bluffs at the southeastern corner of Block Island, Rhode Island. It was designated a U.S. National Historic Landmark in 1997 as one of the most architecturally sophisticated lighthouses built in the United States in the 19th century.

== Description and history ==
Although Congress appropriated $9,000 to build this light in 1856, the funds were used to build a new Block Island North Light after the old one was washed away in a storm. This light was finally built in 1874, with the lamp first lit on February 1, 1875. It is a sophisticated expression of the Gothic Revival executed in brick, and was a marked contrast to earlier lighthouses, which were generally more functional in appearance. The main tower is 67 feet (20 m) in height, with an octagonal granite foundation and brick exterior, which rises to a cast iron parapet and open gallery around the lantern chamber. This is topped by a sixteen-sided pyramidal copper roof with a ball ventilator and lightning rod. The original roof was cast iron, and was replaced in 1994.

The keeper's house is attached to the tower by a 1-1/2 story connecting wing. It is a 2-1/2 story brick structure with identical projecting 1-1/2 story kitchen wings at its rear, and a steeply pitched gable roof with windows extending into the roofline. There are porches on either side of the connector, one for each of the two dwellings in the building, which were originally identical. That on the southwest side has retained original trim, which includes beveled, bracketed posts. The north wing was designated for the keeper, while the south wing was for his assistants. The only major alterations to the residences have been for the introduction of modern plumbing (in 1938) and the repair of storm-related damage. The roof was originally shingled, and since has been covered by a variety of materials, most recently slate shingles.

The original optic was a first order Fresnel lens standing about 12 feet (3.7 m) tall with four circular wicks burning lard (pig) oil. The lard oil was replaced by kerosene in the 1880s. The lens was modified in 1929 to rotate floating on a pool of mercury, at first driven by a clockwork mechanism, which was replaced by a small electric motor.

In 1990, the Coast Guard deactivated the light and replaced it with a nearby steel tower. Because of ongoing erosion of the bluffs, in 1993 the entire 2,000 ton structure was moved about 300 feet (91 m) back from the cliffs. After the move, the Coast Guard decided not to retain the rotating mercury float lens, but instead installed the first order fixed lens which had been removed in 1980 from the Cape Lookout Lighthouse. Ownership of the lighthouse was transferred in 1992 to the Southeast Lighthouse Foundation, which is dedicated to its preservation.

The light was listed on the National Register of Historic Places in 1990, and designated a National Historic Landmark in 1997. The latter designation was made in recognition of the light's historic importance as an aid to navigation, and for its sophisticated architecture, which was only matched by the Cleveland Light, which was demolished in the early 20th century. As of its 1997 designation, it was one of only 12 lighthouses which used a first-order Fresnel lens.

The Southeast Lighthouse Foundation, which owns and manages the lighthouse, has filed lawsuits to block offshore wind farms. The organization has argued that offshore wind farms harm "our ocean view."

== Museum ==
The lighthouse has a small museum and gift shop in the base of the tower. The tower is open during the summer season offering guided tours to the top, for a fee of $15 as of June 2024. Proceeds from tours are used for restoration of the lighthouse.

== Keepers and assistants ==
| Keeper | years | First Assistant | years | Second Assistant | years | Special Assistant | years |
|---|---|---|---|---|---|---|---|
| Henry W. Clark | 1875-1887 | J. W. Tougee | 1873-1874 | | | | |
| Henry W. Clark | 1875-1887 | Nathaniel Dodge | 1874-1882 | Charles E. Dodge | 1874-1882 | Uriah B. Dodge | 1879-1907 |
| Henry W. Clark | 1875-1887 | Nathaniel Dodge | 1874-1882 | John F. Hayes | 1882 | Uriah B. Dodge | 1879-1907 |
| Henry W. Clark | 1875-1887 | John F. Hayes | 1882-1883 | Silas H. Littlefield | 1882-1883 | Uriah B. Dodge | 1879-1907 |
| Henry W. Clark | 1875-1887 | John F. Hayes | 1882-1883 | Charles F. Milliken | 1883 | Uriah B. Dodge | 1879-1907 |
| Henry W. Clark | 1875-1887 | Charles F. Milliken | 1883-1886 | Simon Dodge | 1883-1886 | Uriah B. Dodge | 1879-1907 |
| Henry W. Clark | 1875-1887 | Simon Dodge | 1886-1887 | Willet H. Clark | 1886-1887 | Uriah B. Dodge | 1879-1907 |
| Simon Dodge | 1887-1922 | Willet H. Clark | 1887-1921 | Charles E. Wescott | 1887-1905 | Uriah B. Dodge | 1879-1907 |
| Simon Dodge | 1887-1922 | Willet H. Clark | 1887-1921 | Everett A. Hoxsie | 1905-1907 | Elmer H. Day | 1907 |
| Simon Dodge | 1887-1922 | Willet H. Clark | 1887-1921 | William A. Baker | 1907-1908 | Everett A. Hoxsie | 1907-1912 |
| Simon Dodge | 1887-1922 | Willet H. Clark | 1887-1921 | George L. Hoxsie | 1908-1911 | Everett A. Hoxsie | 1907-1912 |
| Simon Dodge | 1887-1922 | Willet H. Clark | 1887-1921 | Louis F. Schlett | 1911-1912 | Everett A. Hoxsie | 1907-1912 |
| Simon Dodge | 1887-1922 | Willet H. Clark | 1887-1921 | Samuel Pickup | 1912-1917 | Unknown, position possibly eliminated | 1912-1990 |
| Simon Dodge | 1887-1922 | Willet H. Clark | 1887-1921 | Ezra Dunn | 1917-1918 | Unknown, position possibly eliminated | 1912-1990 |
| Simon Dodge | 1887-1922 | Willet H. Clark | 1887-1921 | Edward Murphy | 1918-1919 | Unknown, position possibly eliminated | 1912-1990 |
| Simon Dodge | 1887-1922 | Willet H. Clark | 1887-1921 | Lawrence H. Congdon | 1920-1922 | Unknown, position possibly eliminated | 1912-1990 |
| Simon Dodge | 1887-1922 | Lawrence H. Congdon | 1922 | John H. Miller | 1922-1923 | Unknown, position possibly eliminated | 1912-1990 |
| Willet H. Clark | 1922-1930 | Charles M. Ball | 1922-1927 | John H. Miller | 1922-1923 | Unknown, position possibly eliminated | 1912-1990 |
| Willet H. Clark | 1922-1930 | Charles M. Ball | 1922-1927 | Carl F. W. Anderson | 1923-1924 | Unknown, position possibly eliminated | 1912-1990 |
| Willet H. Clark | 1922-1930 | Charles M. Ball | 1922-1927 | Percy L. Oppel | 1924-1925 | Unknown, position possibly eliminated | 1912-1990 |
| Willet H. Clark | 1922-1930 | Charles M. Ball | 1922-1927 | Hugo R. Carlson | 1926-1931 | Unknown, position possibly eliminated | 1912-1990 |
| Willet H. Clark | 1922-1930 | Earl E. Carr | 1927-1938 | Hugo R. Carlson | 1926-1931 | Unknown, position possibly eliminated | 1912-1990 |
| Carl F. W. Anderson | 1930-1938 | Earl E. Carr | 1927-1938 | Hugo R. Carlson | 1926-1931 | Unknown, position possibly eliminated | 1912-1990 |
| Carl F. W. Anderson | 1930-1938 | Earl E. Carr | 1927-1938 | Elmer F. O'Toole | 1931-1935 | Unknown, position possibly eliminated | 1912-1990 |
| Carl F. W. Anderson | 1930-1938 | Earl E. Carr | 1927-1938 | Charles A. Rogers | 1935-1937 | Unknown, position possibly eliminated | 1912-1990 |
| Carl F. W. Anderson | 1930-1938 | Earl E. Carr | 1927-1938 | Roger H. Green | 1938 | Unknown, position possibly eliminated | 1912-1990 |
| Earl E. Carr | 1938-1943 | Elmer F. O'Toole | 1938-1941 | Alfred L. Bennett | 1939-1941 | Unknown, position possibly eliminated | 1912-1990 |
| Earl E. Carr | 1938-1943 | Earl A. Rose | 1941 | Alfred L. Bennett | 1939-1941 | Unknown, position possibly eliminated | 1912-1990 |
| Earl E. Carr | 1938-1943 | Unknown | 1941-1990 | Unknown | 1941-1990 | Unknown, position possibly eliminated | 1912-1990 |
| Unknown | 1943-1946 | Unknown | 1941-1990 | Unknown | 1941-1990 | Unknown, position possibly eliminated | 1912-1990 |
| Arthur Gasper | 1946-1947 | Unknown | 1941-1990 | Unknown | 1941-1990 | Unknown, position possibly eliminated | 1912-1990 |
| Unknown | 1947-1948 | Unknown | 1941-1990 | Unknown | 1941-1990 | Unknown, position possibly eliminated | 1912-1990 |
| Howard Beebe | 1948-1950 | Unknown | 1941-1990 | Unknown | 1941-1990 | Unknown, position possibly eliminated | 1912-1990 |
| John William Collins | 1955-1959 OinC EN1 Fred Eidson, first assistant; BM3 Fred Gallop, second assistant; EN3 Don Goguen 1962 | Unknown | 1941-1990 | Unknown | 1941-1990 | Unknown, position possibly eliminated | 1912-1990 |

== See also ==
- Block Island North Light
- List of National Historic Landmarks in Rhode Island
- National Register of Historic Places listings in Washington County, Rhode Island

== Images ==
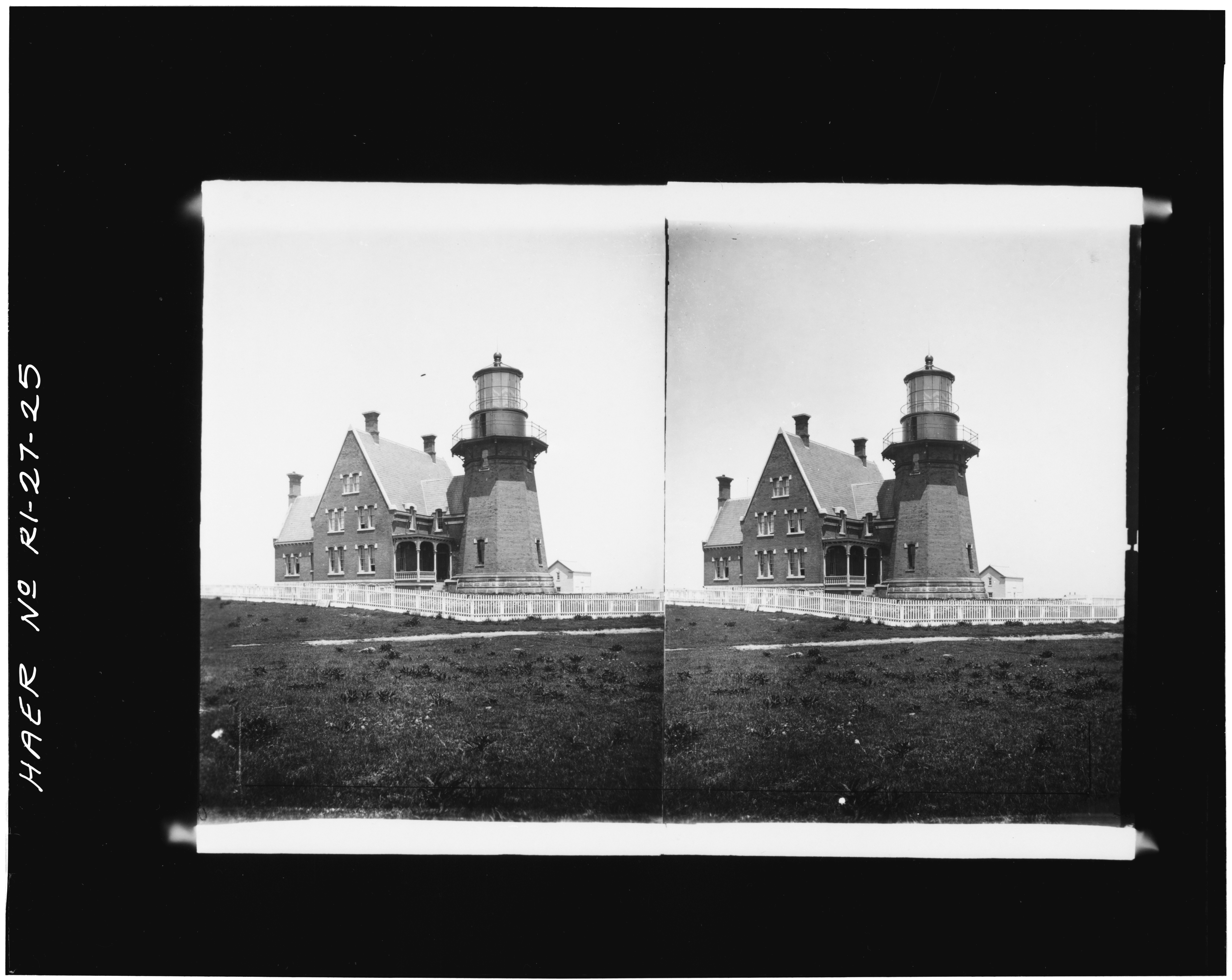
Southeast Light looking NW ca. 1890

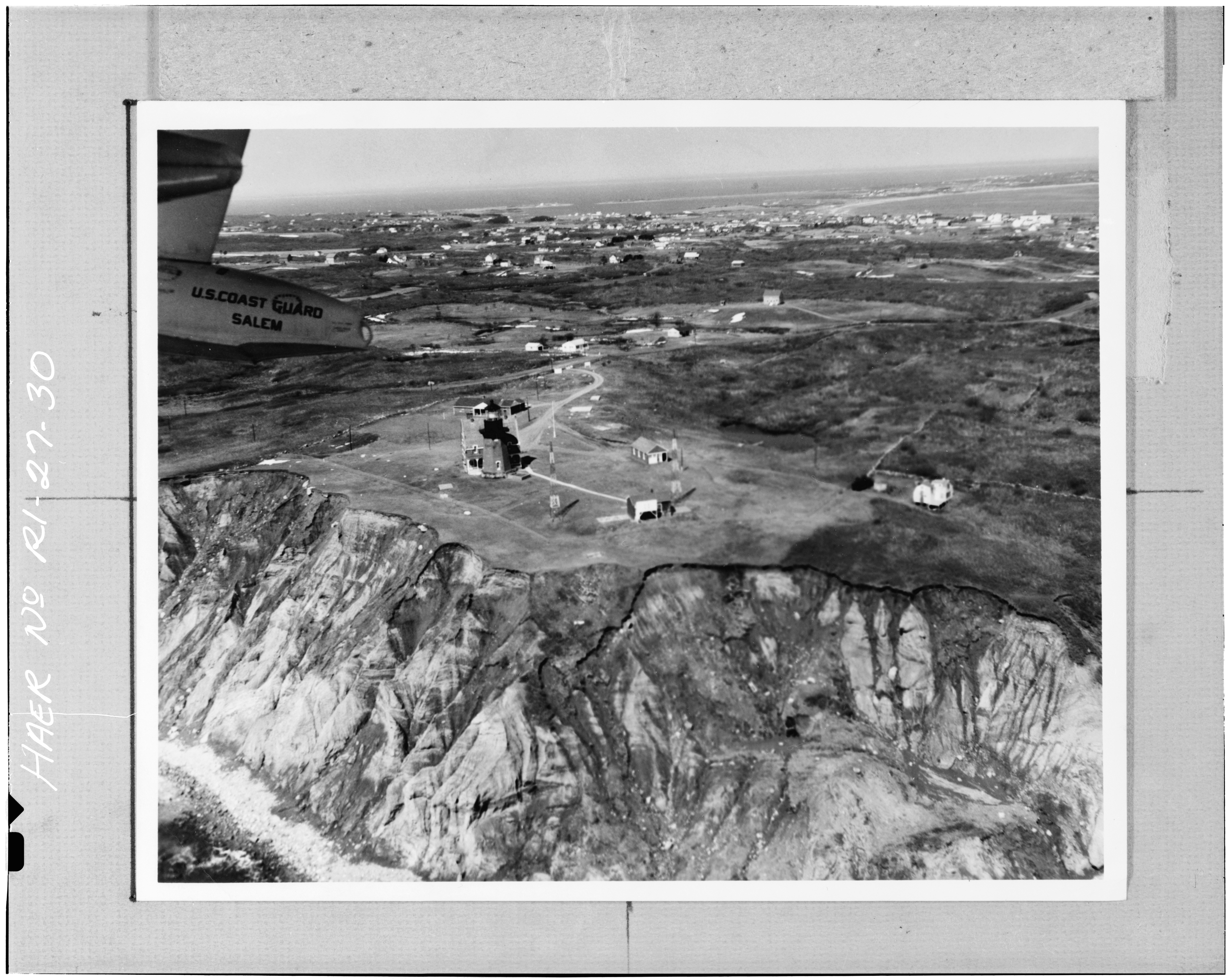
Aerial view of Southeast Light Station by U.S. Coast Guard, Salem, 1962

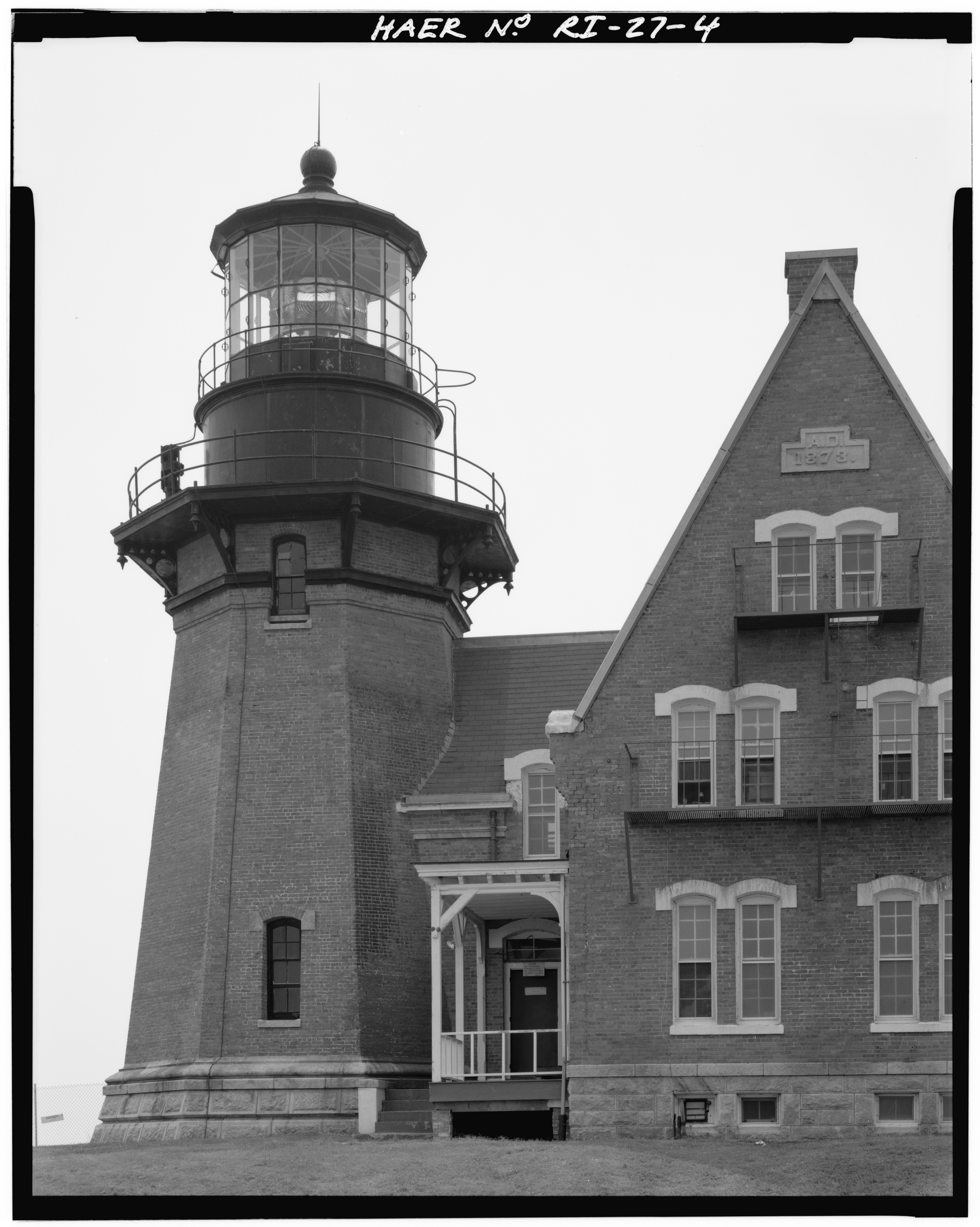
Southeast Light ca. 1988

Block Island Southeast Light

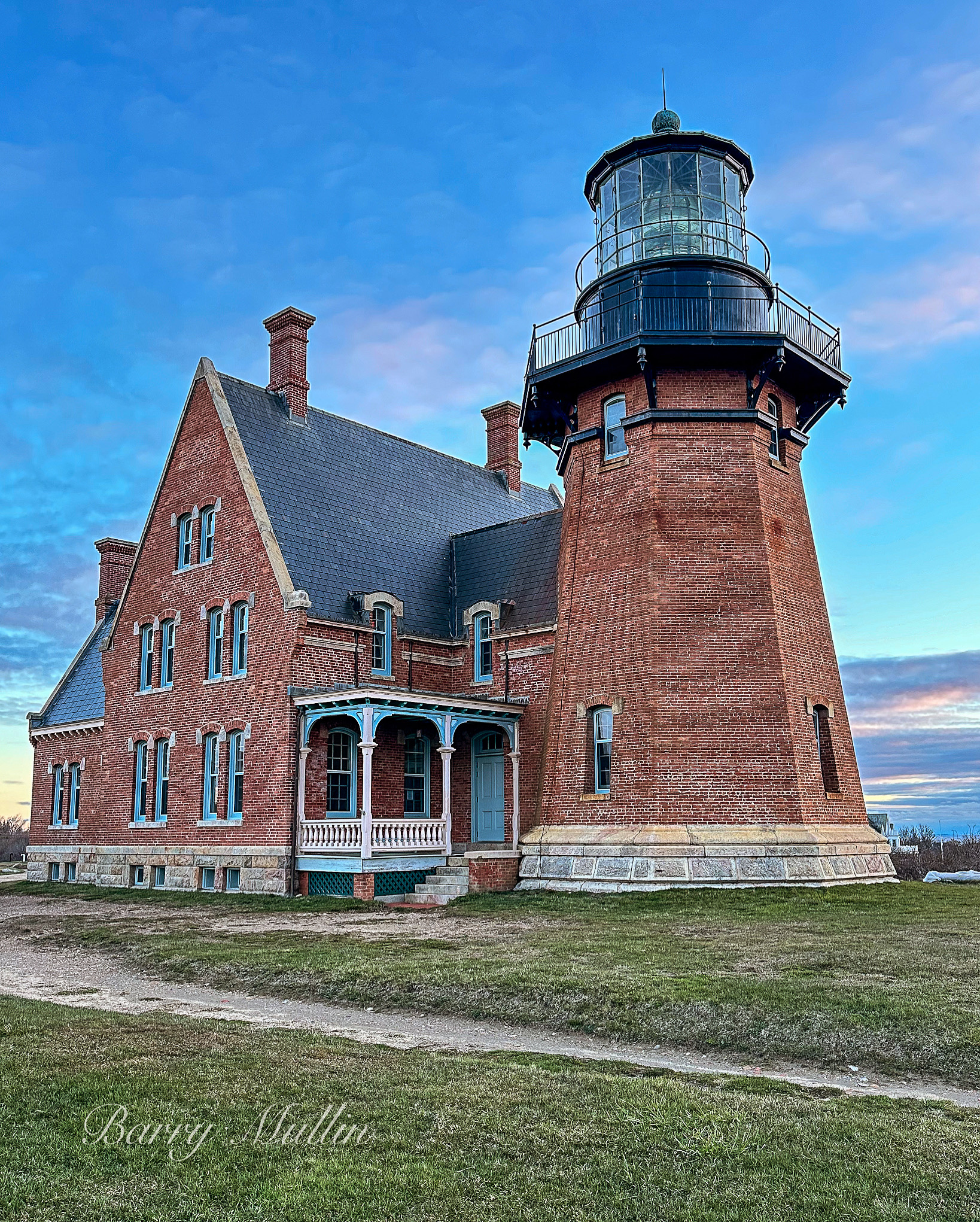
Block Island South East Lighthouse during sunrise in Shoreham, Rhode Island, USA. Photography by - Barry Mullin
