= List of movable bridges in Connecticut =

The following movable bridges are within the State of Connecticut's borders. Eight of the movable bridges are on the Amtrak route through Connecticut. These bridges are the Mianus River Railroad Bridge, the Norwalk River Railroad Bridge, the Saugatuck River Railroad Bridge, the Pequonnock River Railroad Bridge, the Housatonic River Railroad Bridge, the Amtrak Old Saybrook–Old Lyme Bridge, the Niantic River Bridge (East Lyme-Waterford), and Thames River Bridge.

== Bridges ==
Name (Alternate name)	Location	Image	Completed/Replaced	NRHP	HAER
Congress Street Bridge	Bridgeport		1909-1911; Removed in 2010		
East Washington Avenue Bridge	Bridgeport		Original: 1836; Second: Unknown; Third: 1925; Fourth: 1998		CT-154 (third bridge)
Grand Street Bridge	Bridgeport		1916-1919; Removed in 1999		CT-148
Pequonnock River Railroad Bridge	Bridgeport		1902; Replaced in 1996	87000843	
Pleasure Beach Bridge	Bridgeport		1927		
Yellow Mill Bridge	Bridgeport		1927-1929		CT-146
East Haddam Swing Bridge	East Haddam-Haddam		1913		
Niantic River Swing Bridge	East Lyme-Waterford		1921; Replaced in 1991		CT-22
Niantic River Railroad Bridge	East Lyme-Waterford		1907; Replaced 2010-2013		CT-27
Mianus River Railroad Bridge	Greenwich		1904	87000845	
Thames River Railroad Bridge	Groton-New London		1919 (Note: The book Where Water Meets Land: Historic Movable Bridges of Connecticut states it was built in 1918. A contemporary report from the New York Tribune says the bridge opened in January 1919.) Replaced 2008		CT-25
Mystic River Bridge	Groton-Stonington		1922		CT-174
Mystic River Railroad Bridge	Groton-Stonington		1919; Replaced 1984		CT-26
Middletown Railroad Bridge	Middletown-Portland		1911		
Housatonic River Railroad Bridge	Milford-Stratford		1905	87000842	
Washington Bridge	Milford-Stratford		1921		
Chapel Street Swing Bridge	New Haven		1899; Replaced 1992		CT-42
Ferry Street Bridge	New Haven		1940		
Grand Avenue Swing Bridge	New Haven		1896; Replaced 1984		
Tomlinson Bridge	New Haven		1924; Replaced 1994-2002		CT-61
Shaw's Cove Railroad Bridge	New London		1891; Replaced 1984		CT-24
Norwalk River Railroad Bridge	Norwalk		1896	87000844	
Amtrak Old Saybrook–Old Lyme Bridge	Old Saybrook-Old Lyme		1907		
Saugatuck River Bridge	Westport		1884	87000846	CT-46
Saugatuck River Railroad Bridge	Westport		1905	87000126	

- NRHP - National Register of Historic Places listed
- HAER - Historic American Engineering Record listed

== See also ==
- List of bridges documented by the Historic American Engineering Record in Connecticut
- List of bridges on the National Register of Historic Places in Connecticut
