= Niantic River Bridge =

Niantic River Railroad Bridge
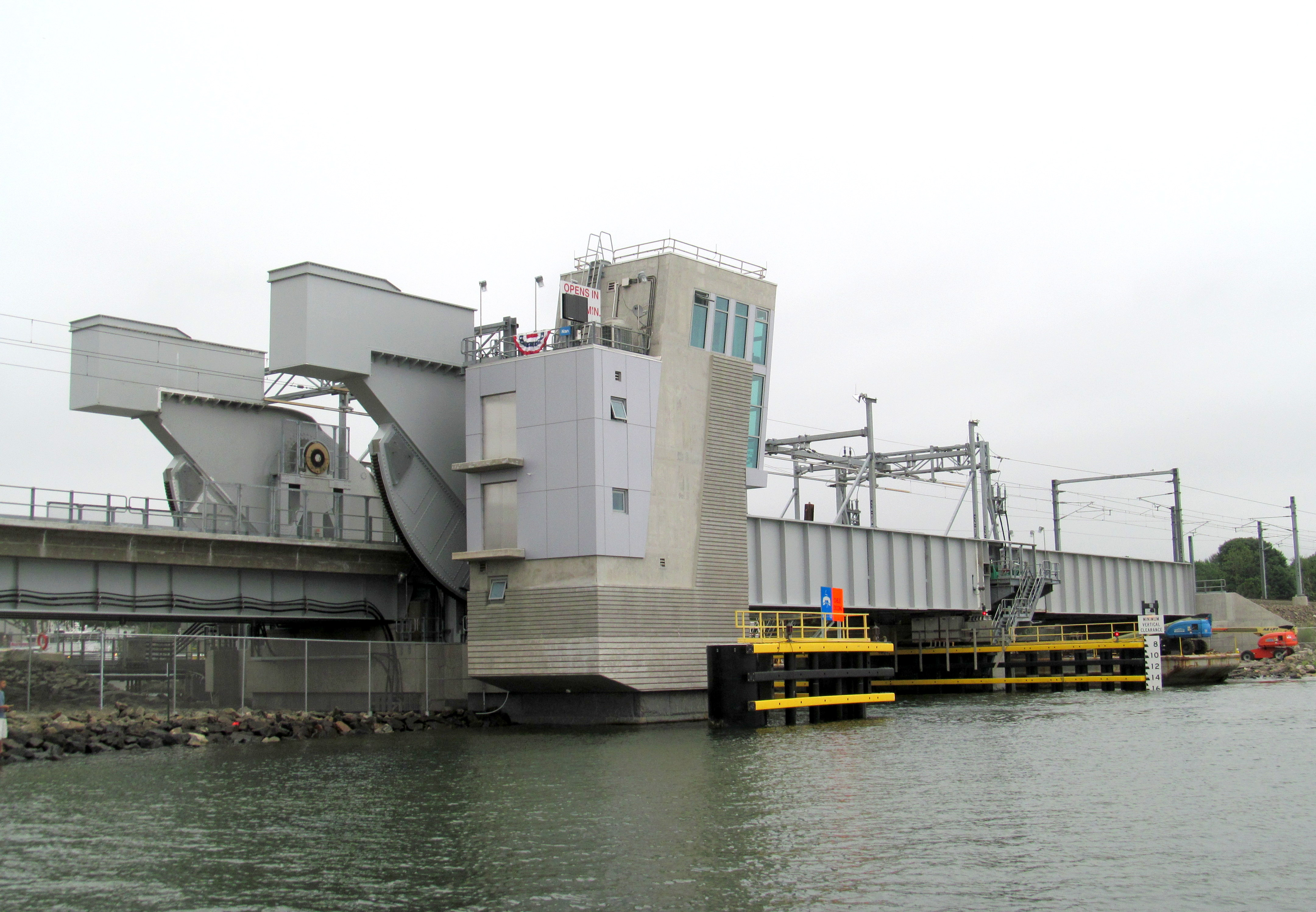
- Niantic River Bridge in June 2013
- Coordinates: 41.3227°N 72.1769°W
- Carries: 2 tracks of Northeast Corridor
- Crosses: Niantic River (Nav MP 0.0)
- Locale: East Lyme and Waterford, Connecticut
- Official name: Niantic River Bascule Bridge CT 116.74
- Maintained by: Amtrak

Characteristics
- Total length: 373 feet (114 m) (movable span 140 feet (43 m))
- Clearance below: 16 feet (4.9 m) when closed

History
- Opened: 1907 (rebuilt 2012)

Statistics
- Daily traffic: 54 trains (38 Amtrak, 14 commuter, 2 freight) (2013)

Niantic River Bridge, also known as Amtrak Bascule Bridge No. 116.74, is a railroad bridge carrying Amtrak's Northeast Corridor line across the Niantic River between East Lyme and Waterford, Connecticut. It is a drawbridge with a bascule-type draw span. A new bridge was constructed in 2012 to replace the former span built in 1907. It opened on September 8, 2012. Related construction work finished in June 2013.

== History ==
=== 1907 bridge ===
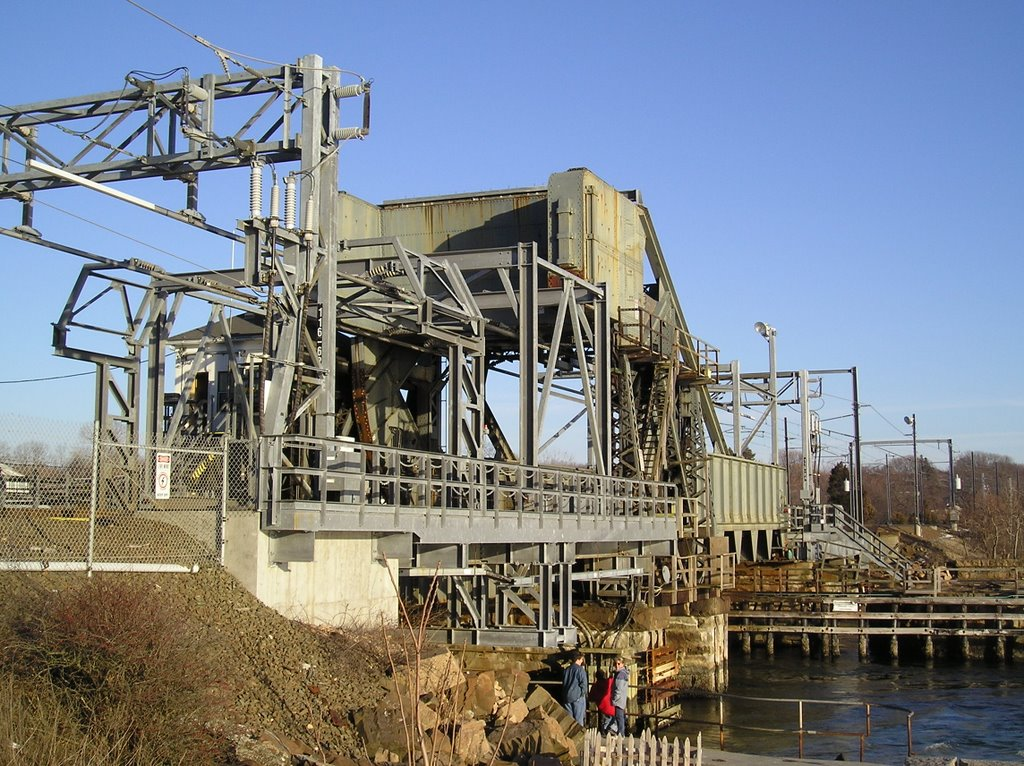
1907 bridge in 2006

The main bridge structure, a 68-foot (21 m) Scherzer through-girder bascule design, was built by the King Bridge Company in 1907 for the New York, New Haven and Hartford Railroad. The bridge was known as "Old Nan" and cost about $48,000. Overall, it was 294-foot (90 m) long with five spans resting on stone masonry piers and abutments. Remnants of the bridge were donated to the Connecticut Eastern Railroad Museum.

It was one of eight moveable bridges on the Amtrak route through Connecticut surveyed in one multiple property study in 1986. The eight bridges, from west to east, are: Mianus River Railroad Bridge at Cos Cob, built in 1904; Norwalk River Railroad Bridge at Norwalk, 1896; Saugatuck River Railroad Bridge at Westport, 1905; Pequonnock River Railroad Bridge at Bridgeport, 1902; Housatonic River Railroad Bridge, at Devon, 1905; Amtrak Old Saybrook–Old Lyme Bridge, 1907; this, the Niantic River Bridge, East Lyme-Waterford, 1907; and the Thames River Bridge, Groton, built in 1919.

The bridge was deemed eligible for listing on the National Register of Historic Places in 1987, but was not listed due to owner objection, with decision reference number 87002124.

The 1907 bridge provided just 11.5 feet (3.5 m) of vertical clearance when closed, constraining most commercial boats in Niantic Harbor to the bridge schedule. Its horizontal clearance when open was 45 feet (14 m), usually limiting passage to one direction at a time. These restrictions made the bridge unpopular with boat owners, which contributed to a 2003 agreement between Amtrak and the Coast Guard which limited the number of daily trains over the bridge. The agreement was later problematic for Amtrak and the state, as it prevented full expansion of Shore Line East service to New London. Due to these clearance issues, as well as increased reliability problems, Amtrak began planning for a replacement for the century-old bridge.

=== Current bridge ===
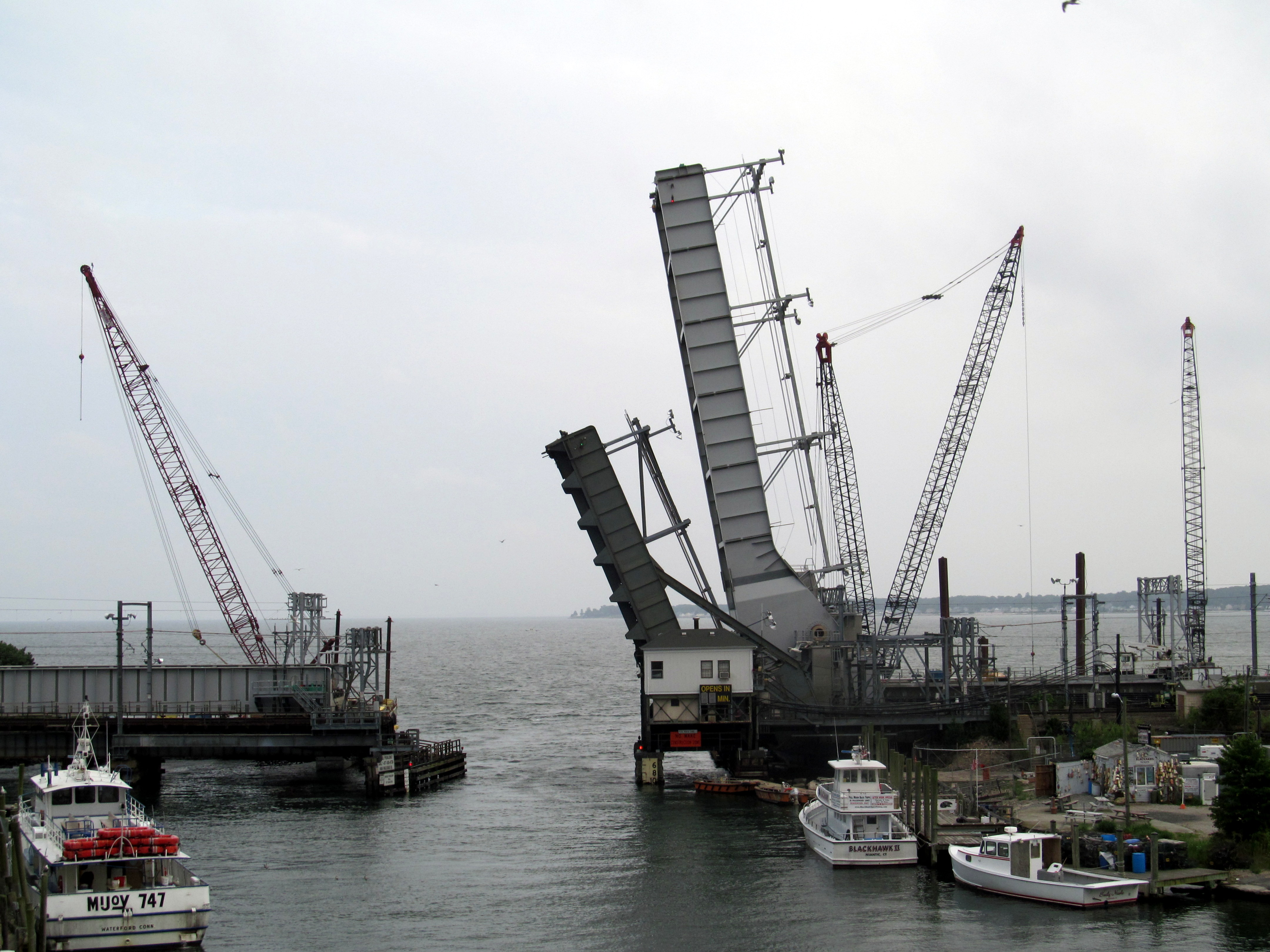
The 2012 replacement bridge towers over the 1907 bridge

In 2010, construction began on a new fixed-trunnion bascule bridge to replace the 1907 span, in an ARRA-funded project. Located 58 feet (18 m) south of the old bridge, on the approximate alignment of the pre-1907 swing span, the new structure provides 100 feet (30 m) of horizontal clearance, and 16 feet (4.9 m) of closed vertical clearance at mean high water. As part of the project, Amtrak also replenished the beachfront and replaced the Niantic Bay Boardwalk, which had been damaged in storms several years before.

The new Niantic River Bridge was opened to rail traffic on September 8, 2012. Removal of the old bridge, which was crossed by a train for the final time on September 7, began at the wane of the summer boating season in September, while restoration of the beach, pedestrian pathways and boardwalks in the affected area, after being delayed by Hurricane Sandy, continued until May 2013. Amtrak announced the completion of the project in June 2013.

== See also ==
- List of bridges documented by the Historic American Engineering Record in Connecticut
