= Pequonnock River Railroad Bridge =

- Pequonnock River Railroad Bridge in 2026
- Coordinates: 41°10′59″N 73°11′11″W
- Pequonnock River Railroad Bridge
- U.S. National Register of Historic Places
- Area: less than one acre
- Built: 1902
- NRHP reference No.: 87000843
- Added to NRHP: June 12, 1987
- Carries: Metro North New Haven Line; Amtrak
- Crosses: Pequonnock River
- Locale: Grand Street, Bridgeport (Connecticut)
- Official name: Pequonnock River Railroad Bridge

Characteristics
- Design: Bascule bridge
- Total length: 372.1 feet (113.4 m)
- Width: 35.1 feet (10.7 m)

History
- Opened: 1998

Location
- Interactive map of Pequonnock River Railroad Bridge

The Pequonnock River Railroad Bridge is a railroad drawbridge (movable bridge) over the Pequonnock River in Bridgeport, Connecticut. Owned by the State of Connecticut and maintained and operated by both Amtrak and Metro-North Railroad, it is also referred to as Pequonnock River Bridge, PECK Bridge, and Undergrade Bridge 55.90 (the mileage from Grand Central Terminal). Currently the bridge is part of the Northeast Corridor line, carrying rail traffic of Amtrak and Metro-North, as well as freight trains operated by the Providence & Worcester Railroad.

== History ==
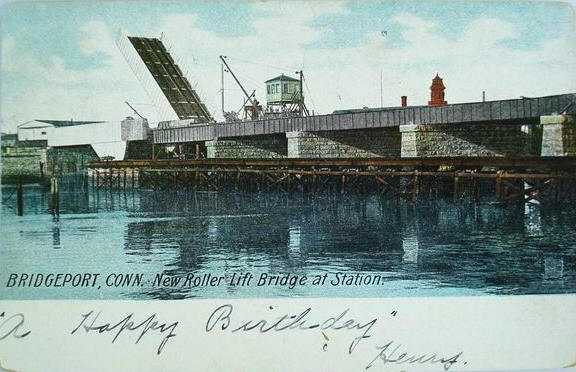
The 1902-built bridge on a postcard mailed in 1909

The previous bridge was constructed between 1898 and 1902 by the New York, New Haven and Hartford Railroad (replacing an earlier bridge) as one of two through girder Scherzer rolling bascule bridges on the New Haven Line. The bridge consisted of twin parallel rolling lift spans.

It was one of eight legacy moveable bridges on the Amtrak route through Connecticut surveyed in one multiple property study in 1986. The eight bridges, from west to east, were: Mianus River Railroad Bridge at Cos Cob, built in 1904 (the surviving twin of the Pequonnock Bridge); Norwalk River Railroad Bridge at Norwalk, 1896; Saugatuck River Railroad Bridge at Westport, 1905; the Pequonnock Bridge; Housatonic River Railroad Bridge, at Devon, 1905; Amtrak Old Saybrook–Old Lyme Bridge, 1907; Niantic River Bridge, East Lyme-Waterford, 1907; and Thames River Bridge, Groton, built in 1919.

The original bridge had 80 feet (24 m) of horizontal clearance, and 15 feet (4.6 m) of vertical clearance (when closed). From its original construction in 1902, it had only two tracks, but it carried a second parallel span to facilitate an expansion to up to four tracks, which was carried out in the late 1960s.

The old bridge was added to the National Register of Historic Places in 1987, an honor not enjoyed for long, as it was obvious even before the survey that total replacement, rather than repair, was needed for the span.

=== Deterioration and replacement ===
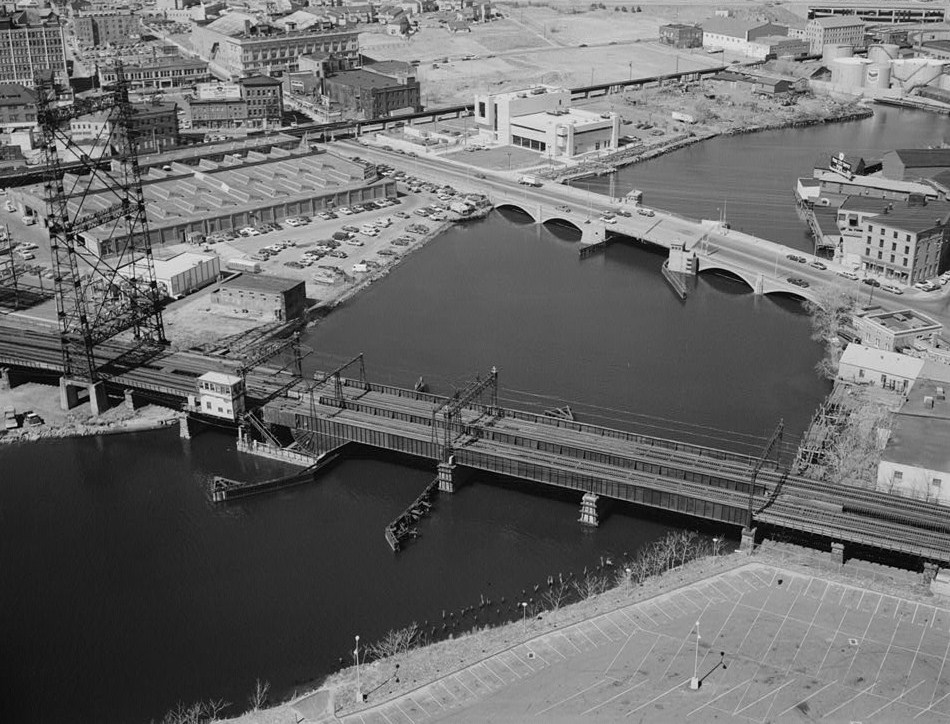
The bridge in 1977

During the late 1970s and early 1980s, the 1902 bridge began to rapidly deteriorate due to corrosion, metal fatigue, and heavy river currents.

In 1986, a routine inspection revealed that the pit pier underneath the drawspan had loosened so much, the drawspan was able to move from side-to-side freely. A 10-mile-per-hour (16 km/h) speed restriction on trains was enforced while extensive repairs were undertaken to ensure the old bridge could remain in service until a replacement bridge was constructed.

In 1992, the U.S. government issued an $80 million grant to help replace the 90-year-old bridge.

Construction on a replacement bridge, which began in 1993, was undertaken in 3 phases in order to minimize the effect on both rail and marine traffic through the area:

- Phase 1 included the realignment of the approaches to the bridge, and the construction of the south span of the new bridge, which would include two tracks. The new south span opened to rail traffic in early 1995.
- Phase 2 included the removal of the old south span, and construction (In its place) of the new north span, which would also carry two tracks. The new north span opened to rail traffic in late 1996.
- Phase 3 included the removal of the remainder of the old structure, additional structural work on the new bridge's two spans, and minor cosmetic improvements in the area surrounding the bridge. This phase was complete in early 1998, and soon after Amtrak and Metro-North jointly announced the completion of the bridge replacement project.

The new bridge has 105 feet (32 m) of horizontal clearance, which allows passage of marine traffic in two directions at the time, as well as 20 feet (6.1 m) of vertical clearance when closed. Additionally, the new bridge has a ballasted asphalt-topping deck instead of an open steel deck, which not only produces less noise, but also makes bridge and track maintenance much easier. As on the old bridge, the new one has twin-parallel spans, but in addition to being capable of tandem operation, they are also capable of independent operation.

== See also ==
- National Register of Historic Places listings in Bridgeport, Connecticut
- List of bridges on the National Register of Historic Places in Connecticut
