= Congress Street Bridge (Connecticut) =

Bridge in Connecticut, United States

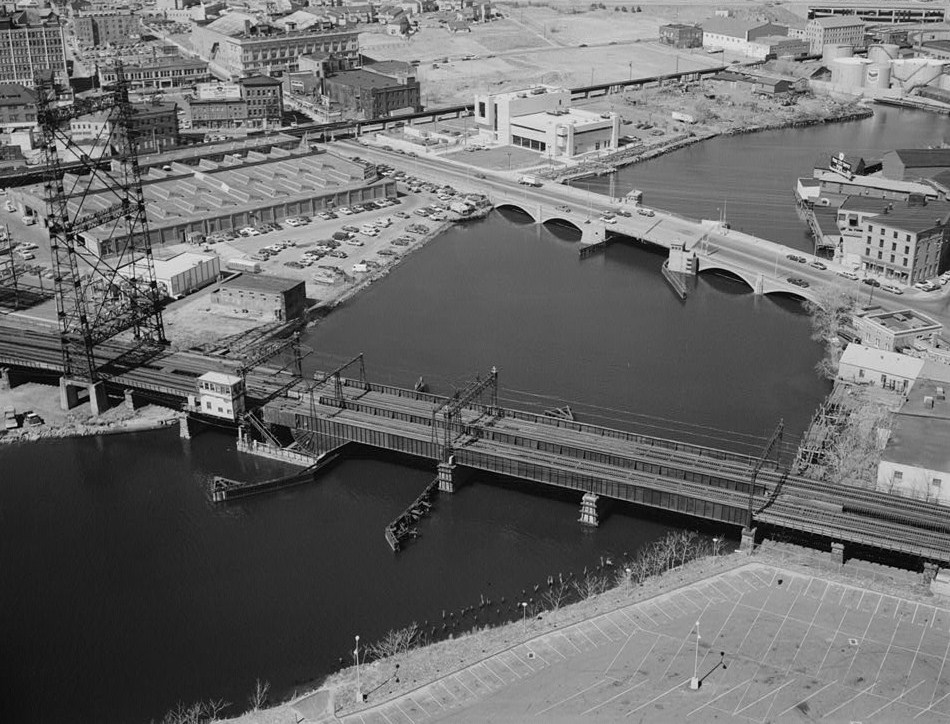
- Congress Street Bridge (background) in 1977
- Coordinates: 41°11′N 73°11′W
- Locale: Bridgeport, Connecticut
- Official name: Congress Street Bridge
- CT bridge number: 4251

Characteristics
- Total length: 425 feet (130 m)
- Width: 55 feet (17 m)

History
- Opened: 1910
- Closed: 1997; demolished in 2010

The Congress Street Bridge was a movable deck-girder Scherzer rolling-lift bridge in Bridgeport, Connecticut, United States. In 1909, the City of Bridgeport tasked a special commission to oversee the construction of a bridge at Congress Street. The original construction was completed in 1911 for $300,000. The bridge served as a street car, vehicle and pedestrian bridge throughout its service life. In 1997, the bridge was closed after the Connecticut Department of Transportation found the substructure to be moving. The bridge was demolished in 2010 and $40 million funding for a new bridge has since been secured. The Congress Street bridge was on the Connecticut Historical Commission's list of bridges.

== History ==
In 1909, the City of Bridgeport created a special commission to oversee the construction of a bridge at Congress Street. A local engineer, Raymond F. Stoddard was hired as design consultant and obtained the license to use the Scherzer design. A Scherzer rolling-lift bridge with a double-leaf bascule was chosen for construction. The design is a Deck-type plate girder bridge; using two plate girders to support the deck. The Scherzer bascule was a popular design because it avoided the expense of high-stress pivot bearings; though it requires stronger foundations to support the weight of the bridge's operation. The engineering firm, J. R. Worcester and Company designed and constructed the concrete-arch approach and Fort Pitt Bridge Works fabricated the movable bridge. The cost of construction was $300,000, which was offset through funding from the Connecticut Company. A contemporary account from the Hartford Courant gave stated the contract was for $305,000 to Snare, Tristo and Company. The bridge was opened to the public July 16, 1910.

The Congress Street Bridge spanned the Pequonnock River and was designed to carry both street cars, vehicles and pedestrians across the river. It was closed and left in the "open position" in 1997 when the Connecticut Department of Transportation found that the substructure was moving. With its closure, traffic has been diverted to the East Washington Avenue Bridge. In 2002, the estimated cost to repair the bridge was $30 million, which could be partly funded by Connecticut's "Local Bridge Program". A total of $5.8 million would be provided by the State of Connecticut with an additional $8.8 million loan.

== Demolition ==
Western end of the bridge, partially converted to a park, in 2026

According to Congressman Jim Himes' website, the demolition funding was appropriated in 2009 and consisted of more than $2 million through federal funding. The money was funded through the American Recovery and Reinvestment Act, the Comprehensive Appropriations Act of 2009, and a Community Development Block Grant. According to the Connecticut Post, the State of Connecticut funded $1.2 million for the demolition of the bridge, and the first phase of the project was expected to cost $500,000. The contract for the demolition of the bridge was given to S&R Corporation and the first task was to remove the eastern portion of the bridge. The entire process was expected to take six weeks to demolish the bridge. It was estimated that another $450,000 would be needed to remove the bridge's concrete counter-weights and $8 million to remove the approaches. In 2010, the Drawbridge Operation Regulation; Pequonnock River, Bridgeport, CT struck the rule pertaining to the operation of the bridge due to its removal.

== Importance ==
The Congress Street Bridge was on Connecticut Historical Commission's list of bridges. Local businesses and residents have claimed that are experiencing reductions in traffic as a result of the closure of the bridge and that it has increased emergency response times. In 2002, Bridgeport's official historian, Charles W. Brilvitch, stated that the City of Bridgeport promised P. T. Barnum to keep the bridge open and free, forever. The promise was made when the city purchased the previous bridge from Barnum and annexed East Bridgeport in 1864. However, limited funds became a concern, with the money needing to be directed to more important projects.

As of 2013, federal funding has secured $40 million for a new bridge, but estimations project $60 million would be needed to complete the project. In a 2008 letter to Congress, the rehabilitation of the bridge was projected to secure 440 jobs as a "shovel ready" project example.

== See also ==
- List of movable bridges in Connecticut
