= Pleasure Beach Bridge =

Bridge in United States of America

- Coordinates: 41°10′N 73°10′W
- Locale: Bridgeport, Connecticut, US
- Official name: Pleasure Beach Bridge

Characteristics
- Total length: 1,257 feet (383 m)

History
- Opened: 1927
- Closed: 1996

Location
- Interactive map of Pleasure Beach Bridge

The Pleasure Beach Bridge is a movable Warren through-truss bridge in Bridgeport, Connecticut, United States. Completed in 1927, it functioned as a toll bridge until the Great Depression, when it was transferred to the city of Bridgeport. Its service life came to an end after it was badly damaged by fire in 1996, cutting off access to Pleasure Beach. In the decade following the fire, several bonds to fund a new bridge were proposed, but ultimately fell through. Pleasure Beach has become the subject of debate, whether it will become an undisturbed protected salt marsh or be revitalized. An alternate method of access via water taxi service, first made possible by a grant in 2009, was not realized until 2013.

== Construction ==
Pleasure Beach Bridge is a riveted Warren through-truss, consisting of longitudinal members joined only by angled cross-members, forming alternately inverted equilateral triangle-shaped spaces along the length. The bridge is supported by timber pilings. The swing span is made of two separate Warren through-trusses that pivots on concrete pier. The operator's house is located on the mainland approach. The bridge spans a length of 105 ft (32 m), by 20 ft (6.1 m) wide, and was rated with an eight-ton limit. Its wooden construction resulted in the timbers creaking and shifting under the weight of passing cars.

== History ==
Prior to the bridge's construction, Pleasure Island was accessible only by ferry. In 1907, the Pleasure Beach Ferry Company was given the rights to build a movable toll bridge. A series of trestles were built across the tidal flats with a swing span across the dredged channel. The swing span was constructed in 1927, but in the Great Depression the Beach Ferry Company transferred control of the bridge to the city of Bridgeport. The tolls were removed and the bridge continued to be used after Pleasure Beach's closing in 1968, until the 1996 fire. Repairs were made to the bridge in 1988 with money from the state. In 1994, the need to replace the bridge resulted in a state and federal promise of $20 million, but this was rejected by the Connecticut Department of Transportation in 1995.

The bridge caught fire on June 16, 1996, when a cigarette butt or match ignited the wooden structure. The fire began around 2:20 p.m. and burned for over three hours. The bridge was rotated to an open position; but the fire badly charred a 200 ft (61 m) section of the bridge. The bridge and Pleasure Beach was then closed. Estimates of the cost of constructing a new bridge or causeway varies between $9 million to $26 million.

== Aftermath ==
The reconstruction of the bridge has been a perennial subject. George Gunther, strong advocate for a new Pleasure Beach Bridge, petitioned for the eight consecutive years to replace the bridge. In 2005, the bridge was slated to have $13.5 million bond grant by the State of Connecticut that was termed "legislative pork". In 2007, a bond for $4 million to build a retractable pedestrian bridge was highlighted, but not constructed.

The damage and closure of the bridge resulted in concerns over Pleasure Beach's fate. The Connecticut Audubon Society seeks to create Connecticut's largest, undisturbed protected salt match. The area has been designated an "Important Bird Area" and the purchase of surrounding land is underway. A local firm, Stantec, has been retained for a study for revitalizing Pleasure Beach; the accessibility to Pleasure Beach is a key issue. In 2009, the city of Bridgeport received a $1.9 million grant for a water taxi service that was delayed repeatedly into 2013.

== See also ==
- List of movable bridges in Connecticut
