= Grand Street Bridge (Connecticut) =

Bridge in Connecticut, United States (1919–1990)

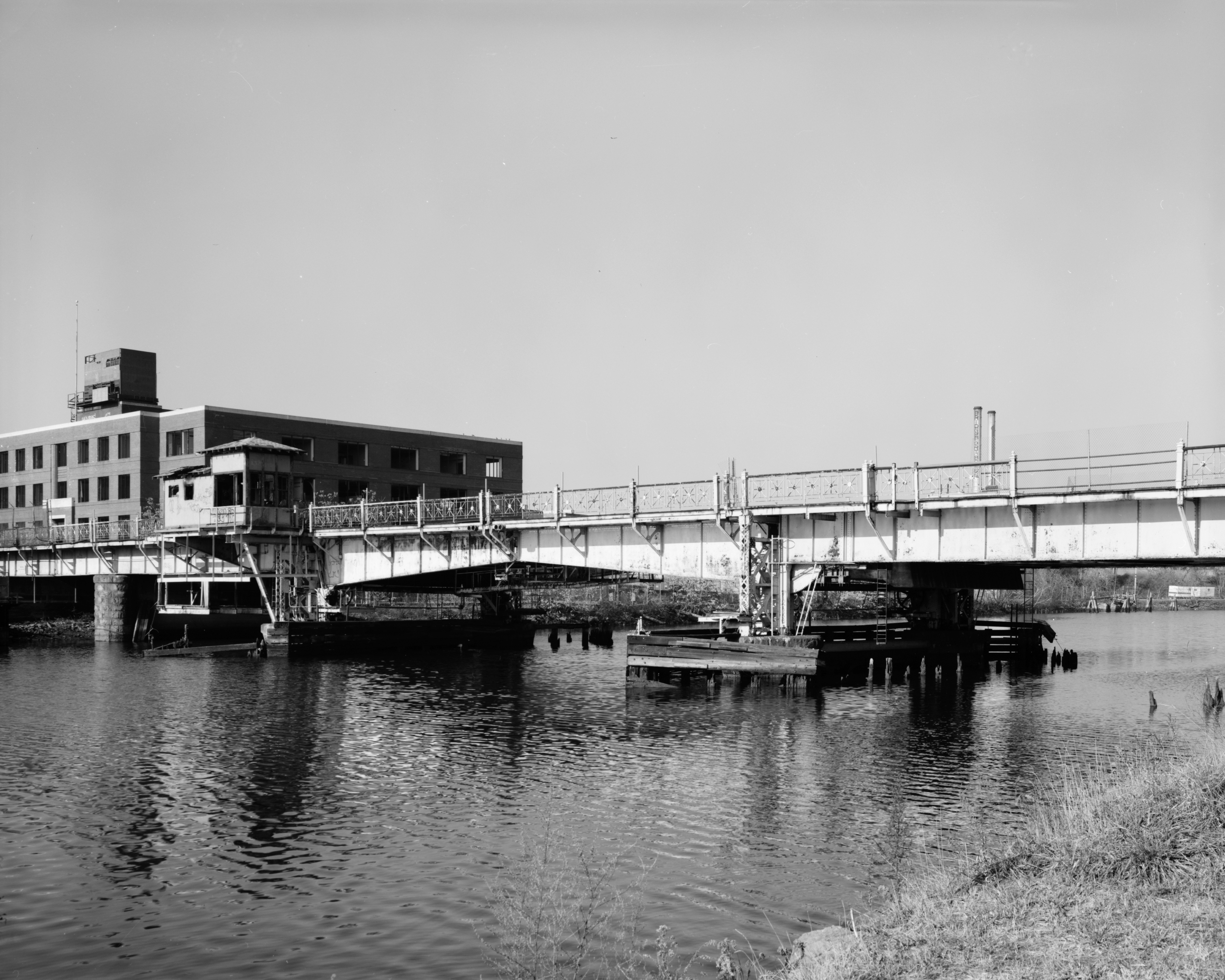
- The Grand Street Bridge in 1995
- Coordinates: 41.1897°N 73.1893°W
- Carries: Grand Street
- Locale: Bridgeport, Connecticut
- Official name: Grand Street Bridge

Characteristics
- Total length: 372 feet (113 m)

History
- Opened: 1919
- Closed: 1990s

Location
- Interactive map of Grand Street Bridge

The Grand Street Bridge was a double-leaf deck-girder bascule bridge in Bridgeport, Connecticut, United States, that spanned the Pequonnock River and connected Grand Street and Artic Street. It was one of three movable bridges planned by the City of Bridgeport in 1916 at the request of the War Department during World War I. Construction was completed in 1919, but the delays surrounding the construction went to the Connecticut Supreme Court in case of Edward DeV. Tompkins, Inc. vs. City of Bridgeport, Connecticut. The court ruled in favor of Tompkins and awarded damages equal to the contract. In 1936, the bridge had excessive settling and required the replacement of its southeast pier. As part of the repairs, a new floor and electrical system were installed. In 1965, the floor was replaced with a steel grate on I-beam floor. In 1984, the eastern approach span was replaced and the northwest trunnion post was reconstructed. The bridge was closed in the 1990s and dismantled in 1999.

== Construction ==
Requests for bids for the Grand Street Bridge were announced in the trade publication Contractor, for the "substructure, superstructure and approaches". Originally the deadline was set for April 6, 1916, but it was later extended to May 6, 1916. The June 1916 issue of Contractor announced that Edward DeVoe Tompkins, Inc., obtained the contract with the lowest bid of $187,000. The contract, signed on May 16, 1916, stipulated that work on the bridge was to begin within 15 days and the project's original deadline would be September 1, 1917.

The engineering firm which provided the design was the Strauss Bascule Bridge Company, and the fabricator of the steel was the Penn Bridge Company. The moving bridge had two bascule leaves, each 48 feet (15 m) long that were connected by a 69 feet (21 m) long deck-girder approach, for a total overall length of 372 feet (113 m). The girders were 40 feet (12 m) in width; which were wider than the 37.5 feet (11.4 m) bascules. The angle-iron outriggers added another 7.5 feet (2.3 m) on each side, making the bridge's total width 55 feet (17 m). The original floor was made of wooden blocks atop wooden planks.

The contract called for the complete construction of the bridge, including the approaches on each side of the river and four piers with each consisting of two cylindrical columns of reinforced concrete. Construction of the bridge was complicated by the contract which stipulated that concrete had to be pumped dry, the concrete of each cylinder had to be poured in "one continuous operation" and that the wooden piles for the pier must project at least six feet into the concrete base. These stipulations required the use of a cofferdam to deposit the concrete, but boring in the river showed that it did not have a suitable bottom upon which to build. Tompkins would have to construct a 10 feet (3.0 m) thick artificial bottom in order to proceed. To deposit in accordance with the contract, a tremie would be needed. A tremie is a pipe that concrete is passed through so it doesn't contact the water and disintegrate.

The plans were stipulated to be presented by May 26, but it first submitted on June 2 with the sketches of the design following on June 14, 1916. The project was delayed due to the consulting engineer's proposals being denied by the Bridgeport bridge commission and the "ambiguous and contradictory requirements" advanced and by the position of the consulting engineer. The project was delayed for months because due to the consulting engineer's discussions, via mail, between Bridgeport and Chicago. Construction of the concrete wing-piles and slabs began around August 1, 1916 and the substructure was nearly completed by January 31, 1917, the original deadline for that part of the project, but the issue with the construction of the piers had already greatly delayed the construction.

In early 1917, Tompkins submitted a plan to attempt a pumping out of the constructed cofferdam, which it noted as dangerous to the crew. This plan was denied because there was no artificial seal in place. The commission did not want Tompkins to proceed until the commission consulted an advisory engineer. In April 1917, William Burr was made the advisory engineer and made many changes to the original Strauss designs, most importantly the requirement that piers project into the concrete cylinders was stricken. Burr's alterations called for an open caisson for the central piers which made impossible the projection of piles into the concrete and required dredging that was unnecessary under the initial Strauss plan. The seal for the end piers was thickened to 14 feet (4.3 m) and would be deposited through a tremie, as previously suggested by Tompkins. The Bridgeport bridge commission terminated the contract on August 20, 1917 and notified Tompkins that it would complete the project. The commission had Tompkin's crew forcibly ejected from the site on September 3, 1917 and took possession of its equipment until October 19, 1917. While the contract allowed the equipment to be taken, it also stipulated that delays that were the fault of the city would result in an equal extension to the time lost and Tompkins would sue the City of Bridgeport. The City of Bridgeport hired another contractor to complete the bridge.

The cylindrical piers of the bridge were 10 feet (3.0 m) in diameter and finished with an ashlar of cut granite. The completed bridge had its bascule leaves pivot on trunnions located 10 feet (3.0 m) from the end of the girders. The bridge's reinforced-concrete counterweights, measuring 5.5 feet (1.7 m) high by 11.5 feet (3.5 m) wide, was supported by pivots at the ends of the girders. The trunnions were supported by box-girder posts on the sides of the bascule leaves and each set of inside trunnion posts were braced by a girder ran both between them and to the operating mechanism. Earle Gear and Machine Company provided the operating mechanism for the bridge. The bascule leaves were raised by a motor that used reduction gears and engaged a pinion to move the rack quadrant to raise the bridge. A manual-operation shaft was originally present so that it could be operated from the surface of the roadway, but it was later paved over. The operator's house was located on the south side of the western approach, it originally housed the operator's house and public bathrooms, but it was removed in 1936. The plans originally dictated for a second station on the opposite end, but 1930s photos shows it was apparently never constructed.

== Court case ==
Edward DeVoe Tompkins, Inc. suffered numerous delays in the construction of the bridge and sued the City of Bridgeport. The case went to the Connecticut Supreme Court in Edward DeV. Tompkins v. City of Bridgeport, Connecticut. Tompkins sued the City of Bridgeport for breach of contract on the grounds that City of Bridgeport was unresponsive, and did not clear the site as scheduled. Tompkins also cited other concerns relating to the design and construction of the bridge including the design engineers from the Strauss Bascule Bridge Company being located in Chicago. The City of Bridgeport alleged that Tompkins was incompetent and uncooperative, but the Connecticut Supreme Court disagreed and ruled in favor of Tompkins. The Court awarded Tompkins the full contract as damages.

== Service life ==
The Grand Street Bridge opened for traffic in 1919, but had to be closed in 1932 after the southeast pier was excessively settled. The Connecticut Highway Department and federal government provided the funds required to remove the bascule leaves and replace the pier in 1936. As a part of the renovations, a new floor and electrical system were installed. In 1965, the bridge floor was replaced with steel grating atop 14-inch (36-cm) I-beam stringers. In 1984, the eastern approach span and northwest trunnion post, the point where the bridge pivots, were reconstructed as part of what would be the bridge's last major renovations. Other minor repairs to the bridge's steel and masonry were done during the project. The bridge was closed in the 1990s and it was dismantled in 1999. In 2010, the United States Coast Guard struck the rule pertaining to the operation of the bridge due to its removal. Previously, the rule stated that the bridge need not open for the passage of vessels.

== See also ==
- List of bridges documented by the Historic American Engineering Record in Connecticut
- List of movable bridges in Connecticut
