= Shore Line East =

Commuter rail service in southern Connecticut, US

- Shore Line East train in New Haven in 2026

Overview
- Locale: Southern Connecticut
- Termini: Stamford (limited weekday service) New Haven Union Station; New London
- Stations: 14
- Website: shorelineeast.com

Service
- Type: Commuter rail / regional rail
- System: CT Rail
- Operator: Amtrak (under contract from CTDOT)
- Rolling stock: EMD GP40-3H GE P40DC Genesis Mafersa Coaches
- Daily ridership: 900 (weekdays, Q2 2026)
- Ridership: 246,600 (annual, 2025)

History
- Opened: May 29, 1990

Technical
- Line length: 90.0 mi (144.8 km)
- Track gauge: 4 ft 8 1/2 in (1,435 mm) standard gauge
- Electrification: Overhead line; 25 kV 60 Hz (New London–New Haven)
Route map
Shore Line East highlighted in red (full weekday route)

Shore Line East (SLE) is a commuter rail service which operates along the Northeast Corridor through southern Connecticut, United States. The rail service is a fully owned subsidiary of the Connecticut Department of Transportation (CTDOT) and is operated under the CT Rail brand. SLE provides service seven days a week along the Northeast Corridor between New London and New Haven; limited through service west of New Haven to Bridgeport and Stamford operates during weekday rush hours. Cross-platform transfers to Metro-North Railroad New Haven Line trains are available at New Haven for service to southwestern Connecticut and New York City. In 2025, the system had 246,600 riders, with weekday average ridership of 900 in the second quarter of 2026.

The service was introduced in 1990 as a temporary measure to reduce congestion during construction work on I-95. However, it proved more popular than expected, and service was continued after construction ended despite criticisms that the line was too expensive to operate. Limited service was extended to New London in 1996 and to Stamford in 2001. A second station in New Haven was added in 2002, and most of the stations were rebuilt for accessibility between 2001 and 2008. Reverse peak service was added in 2007, followed by weekend service in 2008. Second platforms were added to several stations between 2014 and 2022 to support bidirectional service.

Service was temporarily cut during 2018–2019 due to Amtrak track work and a locomotive shortage. It was again cut in March 2020 due to the COVID-19 pandemic. Diesel trains were replaced by Kawasaki M8 electric multiple units in May 2022, but resumed service in 2026. Proposals for future expansion include an infill station in Niantic and extensions to Westerly, Rhode Island, and Norwich, Connecticut.

== Service ==
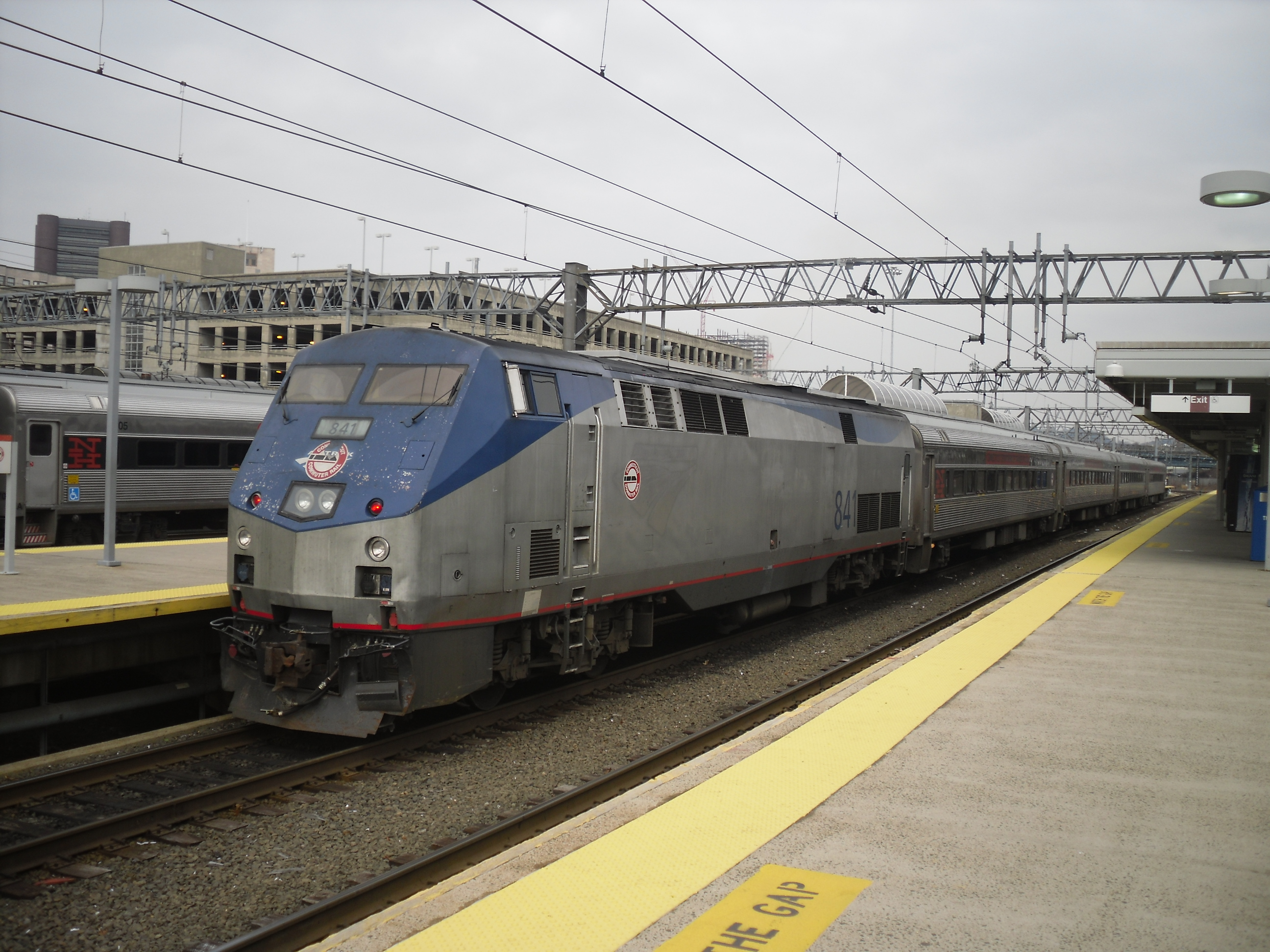
A Shore Line East train at Union Station in New Haven, the focal point of the line

Most weekday SLE trains run local between New London and New Haven, with one peak train in each direction operating through New Haven as far as Stamford. Eastbound morning trains and westbound afternoon trains skip Madison because it only has one platform, and trains operating in the other direction would have to switch tracks to serve the station. All trains that do not operate west of New Haven make a connection with a Metro-North Railroad New Haven Line train at New Haven, for service to and from points in Connecticut, Westchester County, New York, and New York City. These connections are commonly used by extreme commuters who live in suburban Connecticut and work in New York City. New London SLE multi-ride pass holders are also allowed to board selected Northeast Regional trains.

Although SLE service is funded by CTDOT, it is operated under contract by Amtrak. Amtrak owns and controls the Northeast Corridor east of New Haven. West of New Haven, the New Haven Line is owned by CTDOT and trains are dispatched by Metro-North.

During the OpSail and SailFest tall ship festivals at New London, extra Friday and weekend service is operated from New Haven to New London. During OpSail 2000, through service operated from New Haven to Mystic – the only time Shore Line East service has run east of New London.

== Service history ==
=== Previous service ===
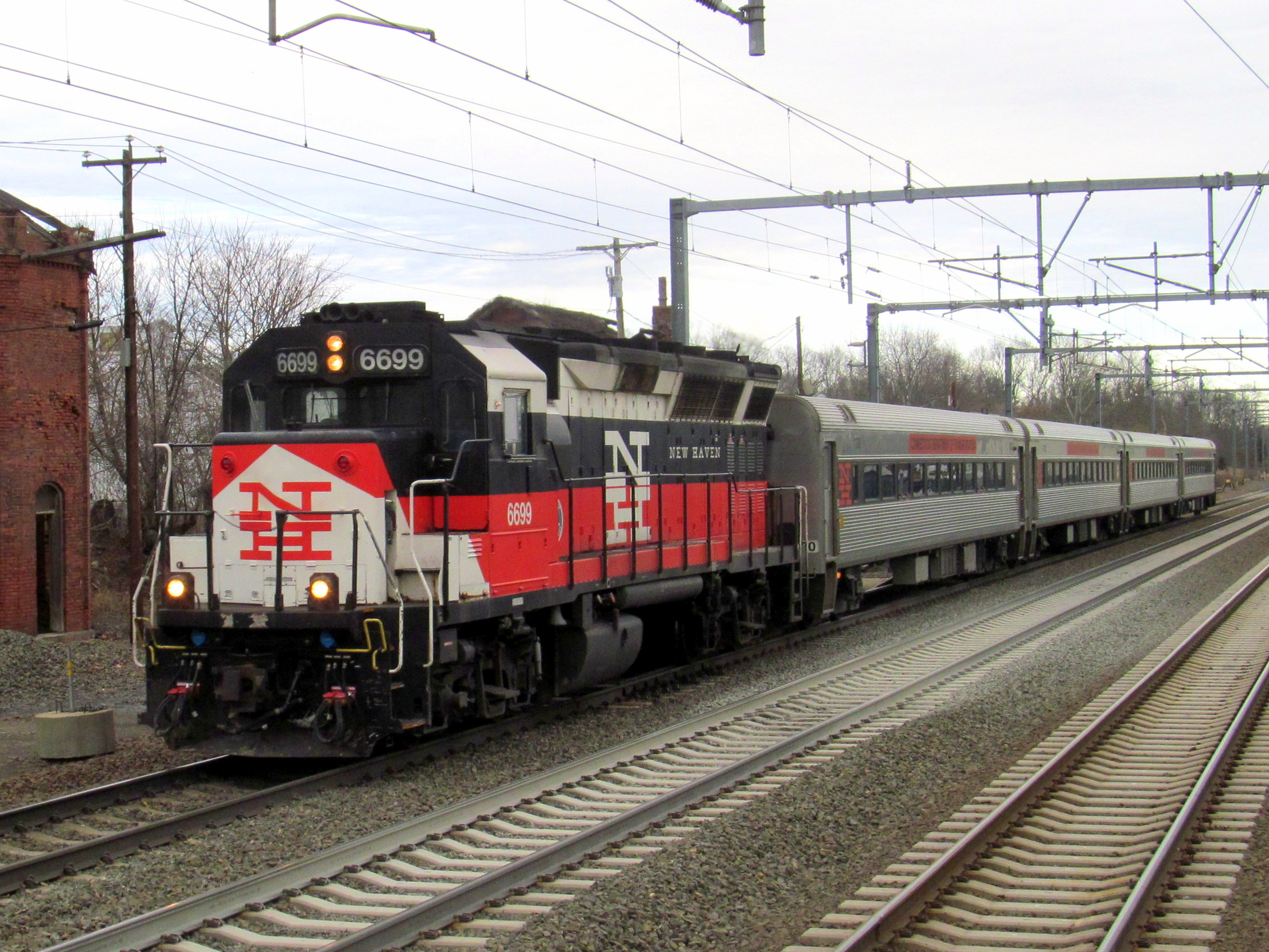
A Shore Line East train with equipment painted in New York, New Haven and Hartford Railroad colors

The section of the Northeast Corridor that Shore Line East operates on was once the New York–Boston mainline of the New York, New Haven and Hartford Railroad. The section from New Haven to New London was built as the New Haven and New London Railroad. It was charted in 1848, began construction in 1850, and opened for service in July 1852. The line was owned by the New York, Providence and Boston Railroad (the "Stonington Road") from 1858 to 1862, and by the Shore Line Railway from 1864 until it was acquired by the New York, New Haven, and Hartford Railroad (the "New Haven") in 1870. Crossing the Connecticut River required a ferry transfer until a drawbridge was built in 1870.

The line was referred to by the New Haven Railroad as the Shore Line, to distinguish it from the railroad's Main Line from New Haven to Springfield, Massachusetts. In recognition of the large role played by the New Haven in the history of Connecticut, CTDOT painted SLE's diesel-powered locomotives in the New Haven's orange and black style. New Haven Railroad colors and emblems were placed at several stations, particularly New Haven Union Station.

Clamdigger service as run by Amtrak in 1971

The New Haven Railroad operated local service on the Shore Line up until its merger with Penn Central on January 1, 1969, when most commuter service east of New Haven was abandoned. Intercity service continued, but generally only stopped at New Haven, Old Saybrook, and New London. Penn Central continued to operate the Clamdigger, a single daily New London-New Haven round trip with local stops, as well as a New London-Boston round trip. Amtrak took over the Clamdigger along with most intercity passenger service, in May 1971. In January 1972, Amtrak discontinued the Clamdigger and Penn Central cut the New London–Boston trip.

In 1976–77, Amtrak operated the Clamdigger as a Providence-New Haven round trip with limited local stops; for three months in 1978, it was revived with additional commuter-based stops. It was replaced in April 1978 by the New Haven–Providence–Boston Beacon Hill, which made local stops including Branford, Madison, Old Saybrook, Niantic, New London, and Mystic. The Beacon Hill (which served the Providence and Boston commuting markets rather than New Haven) was discontinued in 1981 due to funding cuts, ending commuter rail service in Connecticut east of New Haven.

=== Initial service ===
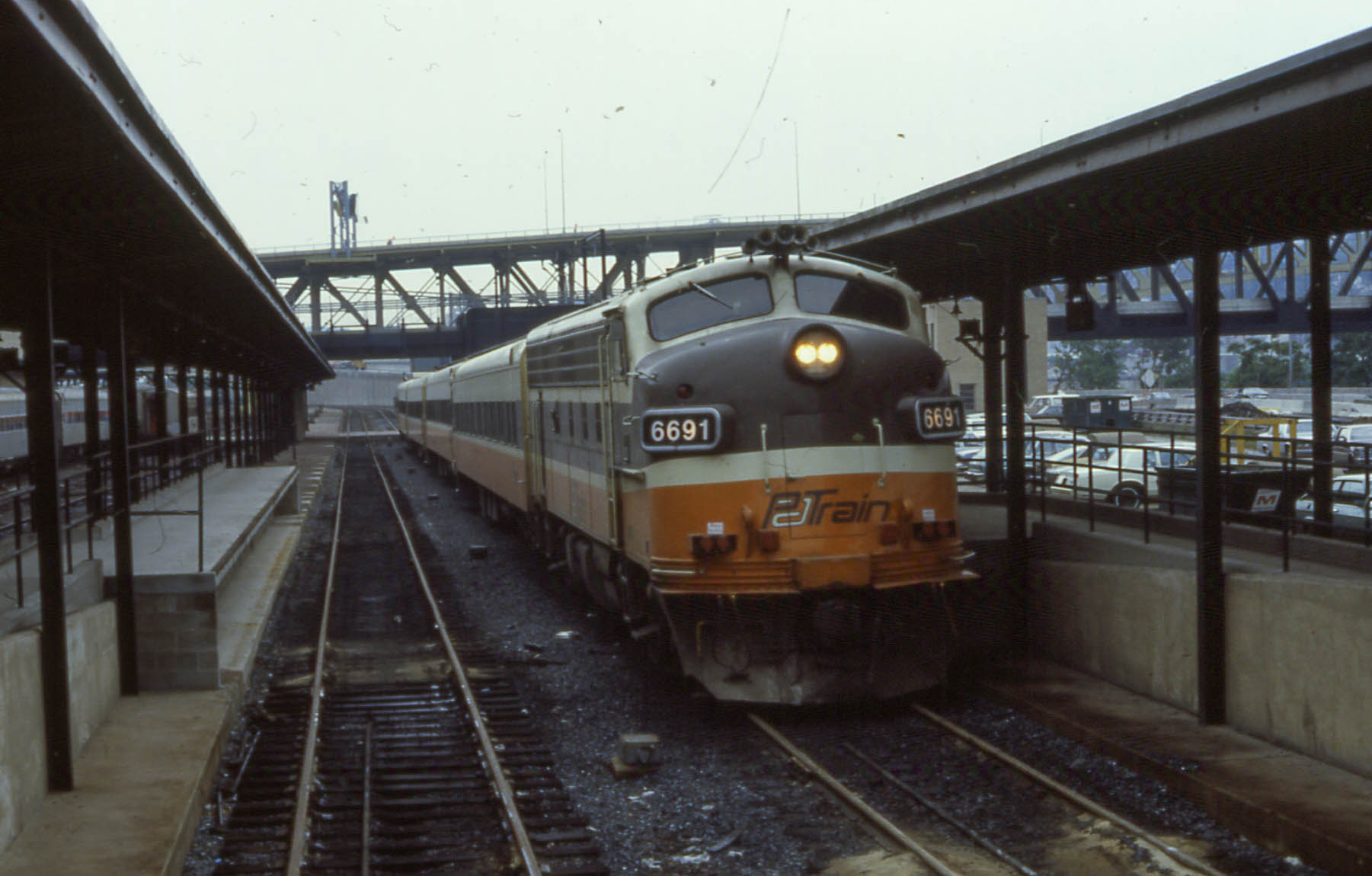
The PATrain at Pittsburgh in 1985. After that service ended in 1989, CTDOT purchased the equipment for use on Shore Line East.

In 1981 and 1986, legislation was proposed to restore commuter service between New Haven and New London, as well as between New Haven and Hartford. A 1986 CTDOT study analyzed congestion on Interstate 95, which runs parallel to the line. The study showed that Old Saybrook was a better terminus for initial service, with an expected ridership of 420 riders in each direction daily. An additional study in 1989 indicated higher potential ridership of 700 to 1350 daily riders.

Based on the 1986 study, Governor William O'Neill ordered CTDOT in October 1986 to initiate rail service on the corridor. It was established as a temporary service to newly reopened local stations between Union Station in New Haven and Old Saybrook, to alleviate traffic congestion that arose from scheduled construction work on I-95. O'Neill introduced a $50 million transportation program that included $900,000 (later reduced to $500,000) for basic stations and $4 million to refurbish 12 Budd Rail Diesel Cars for rolling stock. The RDCs were found to be insufficient and two diesel trainsets were purchased from the defunct PATrain service in 1989 instead. Testing of the equipment on the Northeast Corridor began on December 2, 1989.

The state bought Amtrak's New Haven maintenance facility in May 1989 and signed a service contract with Amtrak in November. Construction of 5 intermediate stations was completed in April 1990. Shore Line East service began on May 29, 1990, with four trains each direction during the morning and evening. The service carried the Clamdigger name during planning; "Shore Line East" did not appear until shortly before service began. Shore Line East was threatened to be cut in 1991 by newly elected Governor Lowell Weicker, but it proved more popular than expected, and was effectively made permanent. A 1996 study found that Shore Line East captured eight percent of regional commuter trips and attracted a loyal ridership base.

In 1995 and 1997, then-governor John Rowland proposed to replace Shore Line East and the Waterbury Branch with bus service, citing a high subsidy of $18.70 per rider per trip, in order to decrease the unpopular gas tax. Lawmakers from the region called the proposals political and defended the line's ability to reduce congestion and pollution, while opponents of the line called it an example of government waste. The Shore Line East Rider's Association and other groups lobbied to save both services each time, and after public hearings a small fare increase was enacted in late 1997 instead.

=== Early expansions ===
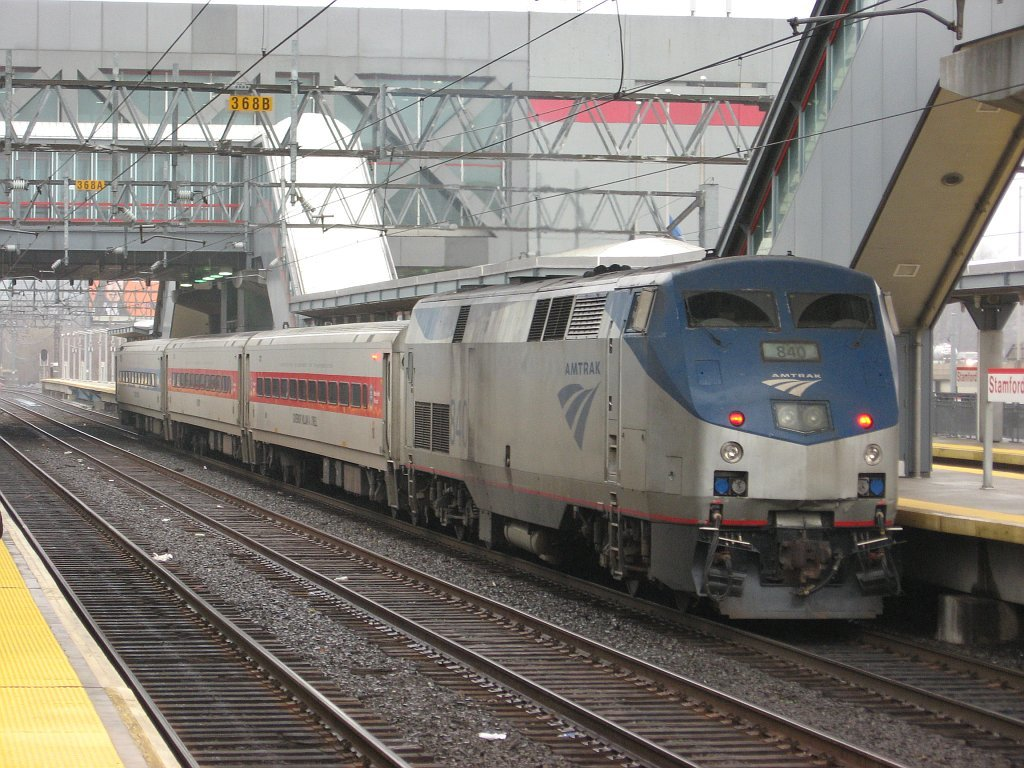
A rush-hour Shore Line East train at Stamford in 2007

In July 1995, Governor Rowland signed a bill ordering various studies, including one that analyzed extending service to New London as had been originally planned. Before the study was completed, CTDOT unilaterally decided to implement New London service, which the report commended. On February 1, 1996, two round trips per weekday were extended to New London. At that point, ridership was up 18 percent over 1991 numbers.

In December 2001, a single morning rush-hour round trip branded SLExpress was extended to Stamford, with a stop at Bridgeport plus eastbound-only stops at Stratford and Milford. An evening eastbound trip was also extended to Stamford with only the Bridgeport intermediate stop. This trip was intended to allow commuters to reach employment centers in Bridgeport and Stamford without having to make a transfer at New Haven. On June 24, 2002, additional Stamford trains were added, for a total of two westbound and three eastbound trains. South Norwalk station was added as a stop for the single morning eastbound trip. When West Haven opened on August 18, 2013, it was added to these trips as well.

In 2003, in order to add four additional Amtrak trips along the corridor, four of the six round trips to New London were cut back to Old Saybrook. An agreement with the Connecticut Department of Energy and Environmental Protection limits service over the Amtrak Old Saybrook–Old Lyme Bridge in order to avoid inconveniencing recreational boaters. CTDOT's agreement with Amtrak allowed commuters with monthly passes to ride certain Amtrak trains instead. After criticism over the service cuts, in April 2008 CTDOT began allowing commuters with multi-ride passes to board the selected Amtrak trains as well.

=== Station reconstruction ===
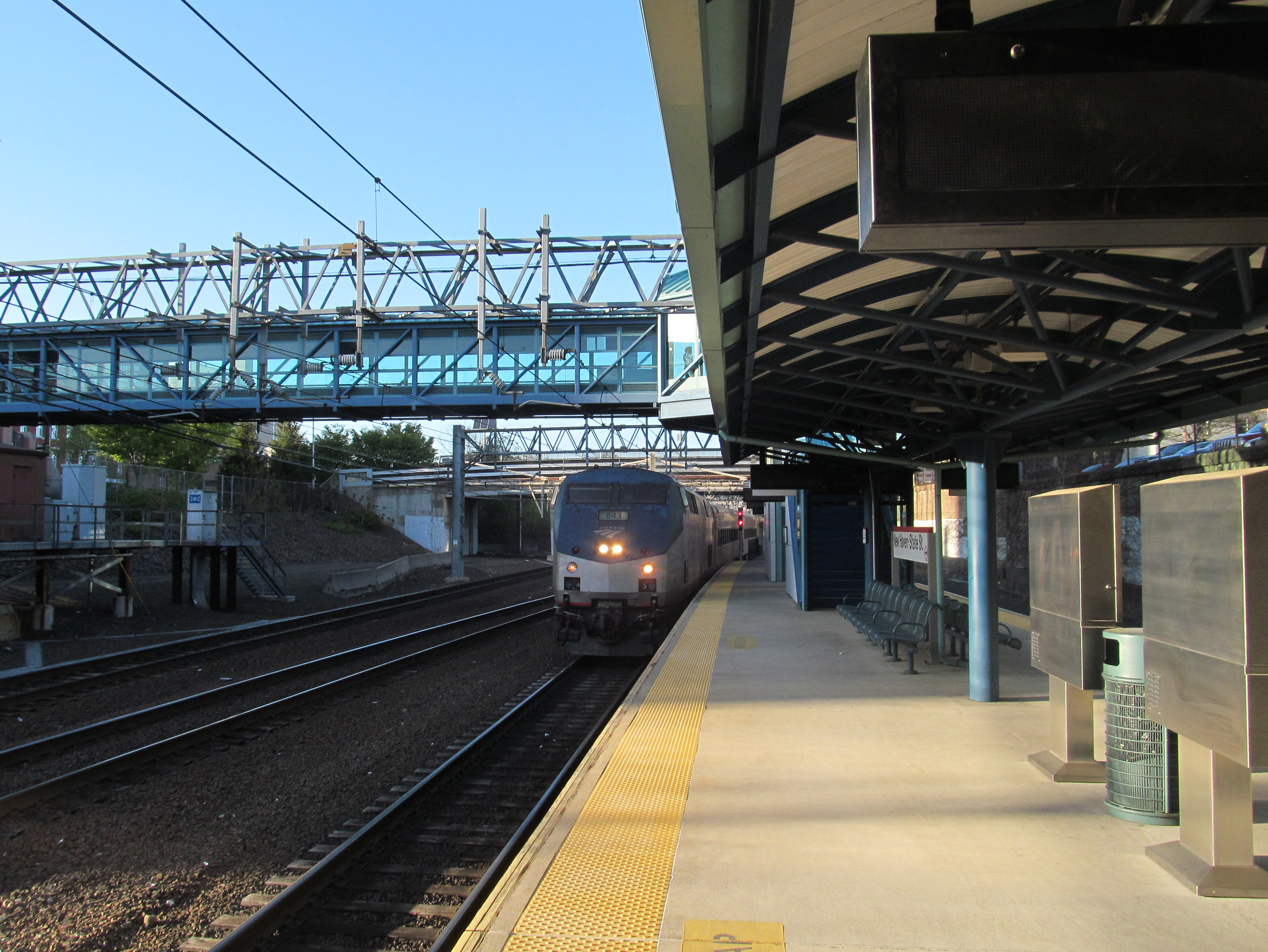
State Street station in New Haven opened in 2002 near the city's downtown district.

Because Shore Line East was intended to be a temporary service, the five intermediate stations built in 1990 were little more than wooden decks. Since the service was started two months before the Americans with Disabilities Act was signed, the platforms were not built to be accessible. In January 2001, because of changes in Amtrak rules related to the introduction of Acela Express service, passengers were no longer allowed to cross tracks to access trains. New platforms were opened on the south side of the tracks at Branford and Westbrook at approximately the same locations. Later that year, accessible high-level platforms were added at New London to support Acela Express service.

On June 7, 2002, State Street station was opened in New Haven to provide better access to the downtown area than Union Station. It was built as a traffic mitigation measure during the reconstruction of the Pearl Harbor Memorial Bridge. The first existing station to be rebuilt specifically for Shore Line East was Old Saybrook. A new high-level island platform and pedestrian bridge opened on November 1, 2002; the final configuration of two platforms serving all three tracks allows Amtrak trains to pass SLE trains at the station.

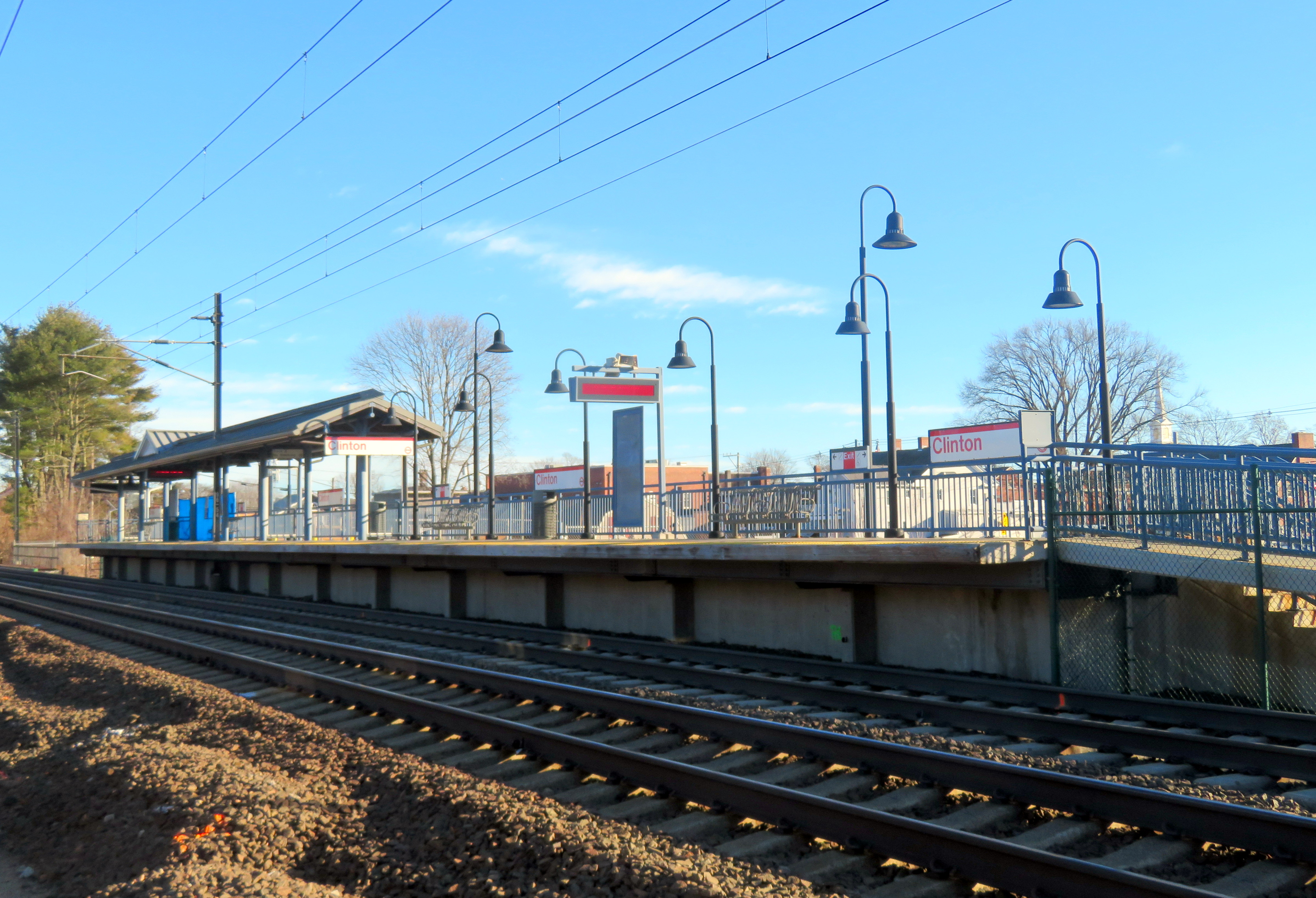
Clinton station as rebuilt in 2004–05

Beginning on May 24, 2004, construction of new platforms began at Clinton, Guilford, and Branford. The rebuilt Clinton station opened on July 25, 2005, and the rebuilt Branford station opened on August 8, 2005; both consist of a single high-level platform on the south side of the tracks. The new Guilford station, which has platforms on both sides of the tracks (connected by a pedestrian bridge) to allow for greater operational flexibility, opened on November 28, 2005. Construction at Madison started on September 24, 2007, and finished with the opening of the rebuilt station platform on July 28, 2008.

Reconstruction of Westbrook station was delayed due to environmental and cost issues. No site was available until Westbrook and CTDOT traded the new station site on Norris Avenue for a highway garage site off Route 145. The controversial land swap was begun in 2004 but was not finalized until 2006, and town operations were not moved to the Route 145 site until September 2011. Site clearing began in November 2011, and ground was broken for the $14.4 million station in January 2012. A new station with a larger 210-space lot and platforms on both tracks opened on March 25, 2014, with full bidirectional service to the station beginning on May 11.

=== Weekend and New London service ===
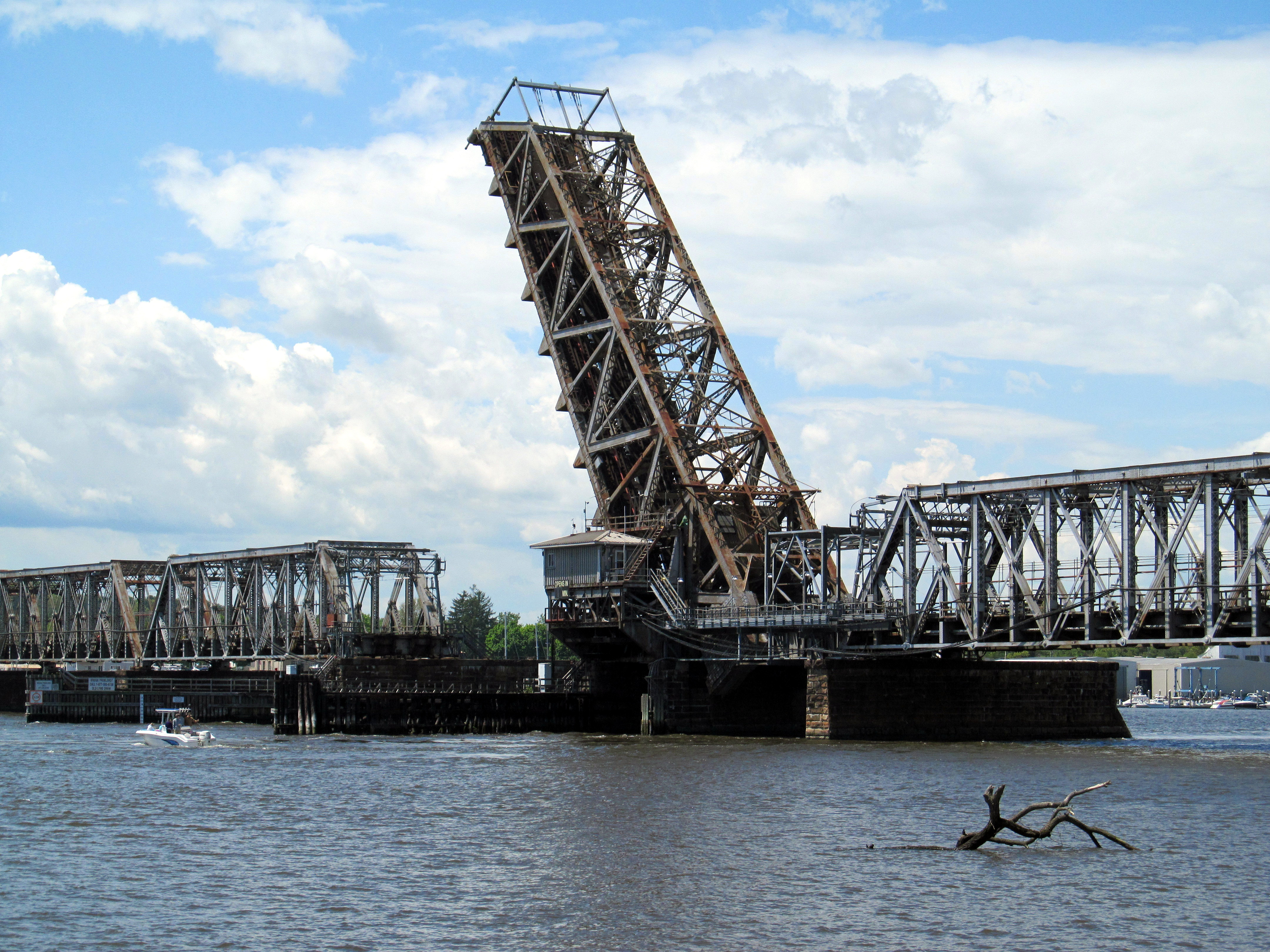
Conflicts over closings of the Old Saybrook–Old Lyme bridge were the primary obstacle to full service to New London

On October 8, 2007, reverse-peak and more midday service were introduced, which officials hailed as the beginning of Shore Line East as a true bidirectional system. Several existing express trains also began to stop at Guilford. A pilot of weekend service was run from November 17, 2007, to December 30, 2007, with six "Shopper's Special" round trips from Old Saybrook to New Haven. The trains were scheduled to connect with similar Metro-North specials at New Haven. Year-round weekend service began on July 4, 2008, with 9 daily Old Saybrook – New Haven round trips on weekends. No weekend service was run to New London, but weekday service was increased by the addition of cross-honoring of multiple-ride and monthly tickets on two Amtrak trains.

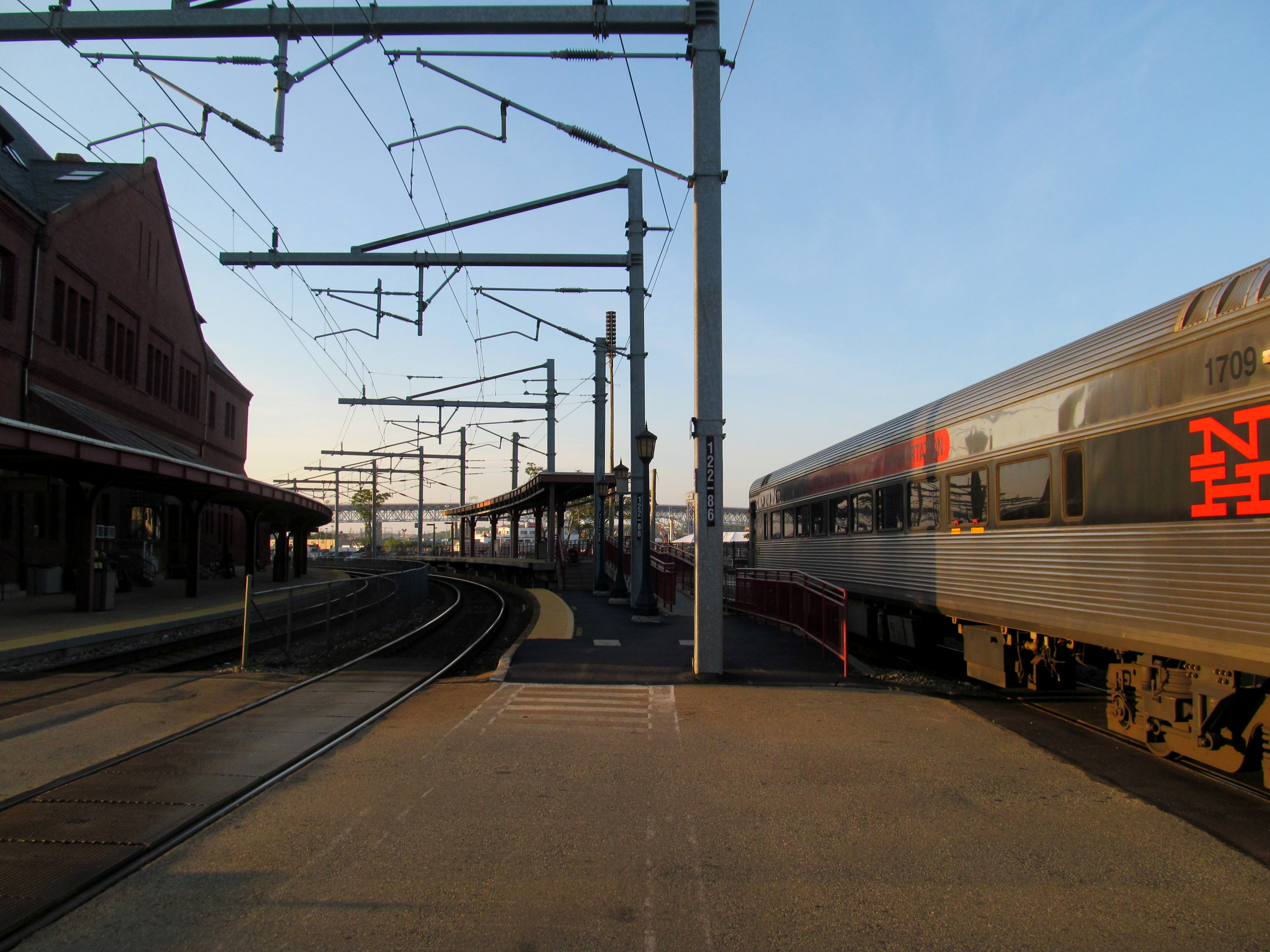
A weekend Shore Line East train arrives at New London in June 2013

The major obstacle preventing full New London service was the bridge over the Connecticut River between Old Saybrook and Old Lyme. The drawbridge section is closed for a certain period of time to allow trains to pass, which prevents large boats from passing under. The Marine Trades Association opposes additional service, which would mandate more bridge closings. The 2003 agreement with Amtrak limited weekday traffic over the bridge to 2 SLE and 39 Amtrak trains until 2018, although it was revised in 2010 and 2013.

Since 2003, New London had been served by cross-honored Amtrak trains plus one or two dedicated SLE round trips. On February 16, 2010, an additional round trip was extended to New London. Three more were extended on May 10, 2010. However, advocates for full service to New London said that then-governor Jodi Rell failed to deliver on promises to New London, with one newspaper columnist writing that "she seems incapable of standing up to the marine trades lobby" regarding the bridge openings.

In July 2012, then-governor Dannel Malloy announced that five weekend round trips would be extended to New London beginning in April 2013. However, the extension was dependent on ongoing negotiations with the marine industry over mandated closings of the Connecticut River bridge. Two weekday midday trips were added in May 2013, while weekend service began on June 1, 2013, after the application for additional bridge closings was approved by the state Department of Energy and Environmental Protection. By July, New London represented 26 percent of weekend ridership. In December 2013, the state announced that ridership was up 35 percent for the year as a result of the increased service. From 2009 to 2014, monthly New London ridership increased from less than 1,000 monthly passengers to approximately 5,000, accounting for a significant fraction of ridership increases on Shore Line East during that period.

=== Second platforms ===
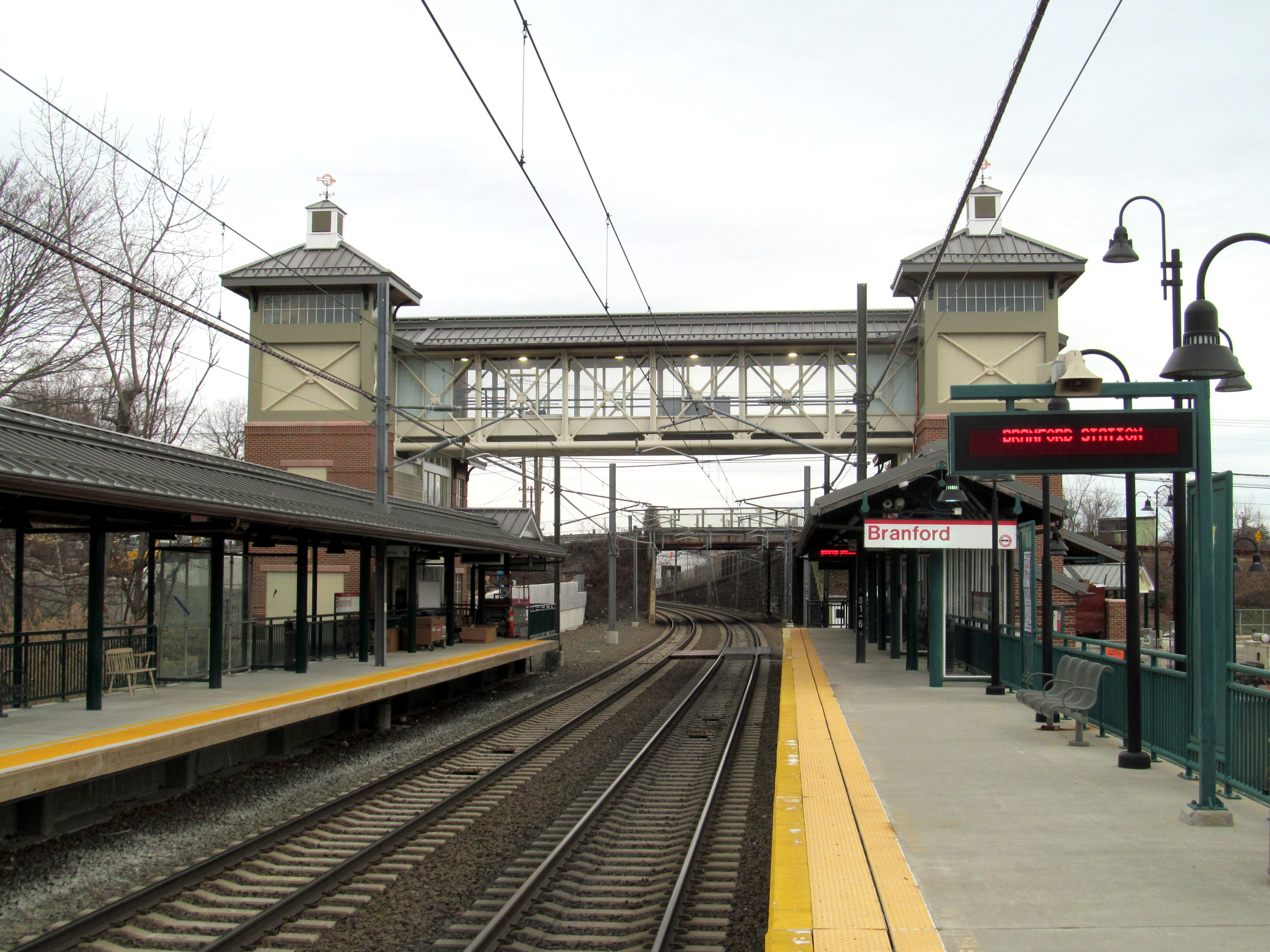
A second platform (left) was completed at Branford station in late 2016.

In a 2007 report, CTDOT outlined plans to turn SLE into a full-service bidirectional regional rail line, with full-day service and all trains extended to New London. This involved incremental improvements, similar to those that have already been put into place. One of the first priorities was to add a second platform at all stations, which was mandated by the 2003 agreement with Amtrak. By that time, several stations already had multiple platforms (New London, Old Saybrook, Guilford, and the stations from New Haven Union Station west), while State Street had an island platform serving two tracks.

Branford was the first previously rebuilt station to be further renovated with a second platform. A $60 million bond in February 2011 included $16.5 million for a second platform and pedestrian bridge at Branford, $7.3 million for platform extensions at Guilford, and $11 million to electrify several sidings along the line. Construction on the new platform at Branford began in September 2013, while the Guilford work was underway by early 2014. After delays, the enlarged Branford station opened on September 30, 2016, although the north platform was not immediately served by trains. The north platform entered service on November 5, 2016. As with other stations, reverse-peak trains began stopping at Branford with the opening of the second platform.

Construction of a second platform at Clinton station was originally planned to start in early 2012, but was indefinitely delayed by 2014. Construction was again announced in October 2017. After delays due to funding issues, construction began in June 2019. The second platform opened on April 4, 2022, leaving Madison as the only single-platform station. (Bidding on a second platform and three-level parking garage at Madison, planned since 2009, was scheduled to begin in 2013 but did not occur.) As of January 2026, reconstruction of Madison station is planned to begin in fall 2027.

Expansion of the original parking facilities was also necessary to meet demand, since many started with small lots suitable for just a few dozen cars. The rebuilt stations at Branford, Guilford, Madison, Clinton, and Westbrook have larger lots than the 1990 stations, and a second lot with 272 spaces opened at Branford in June 2011.

=== Service cuts and increases ===
In 2018, two separate issues caused numerous delays and cancellations with many trains replaced by buses. An Amtrak track maintenance project required single-tracking of sections of the line, and CTDOT lacked sufficient functional locomotives as the aging fleet was sent out for refurbishment. Three weekday round trips were reverted from bus to train in January 2019 when one locomotive returned from refurbishment, though additional issues were expected during a second summer of track work in 2019. Full service was restored on August 5, 2019. By that time, ridership had fallen by 25 percent, averaging 1,340 weekday riders and 767 weekend riders.

On March 16, 2020, weekday service began operating on a reduced schedule due to the coronavirus pandemic. All Stamford through service was suspended. Cross-honoring of tickets on Amtrak trains was suspended that June. Weekday service was expanded from 8 to 11.5 round trips (compared to 18 pre-COVID round trips) on July 26, 2021, with all trains running to New London. Cross-honoring resumed on September 27, 2021. Electrification and track work on Track 6 at New London took place from November 2021 to April 2022. This allowed all-electric service using M8 railcars to begin on May 24, 2022. Shore Line East ridership only reached about 25% of pre-pandemic ridership by mid-2022 – compared to 40% to 72% for other rail lines in the state – which was attributed to previous riders largely being white-collar workers who shifted to remote work.

In April 2024, a bill to restore service to pre-pandemic levels stalled in the state Senate. However, in May 2024, $5 million in American Rescue Plan Act funds were allocated for the restoration of two additional weekday round trips, as well as the restoration of Stamford through service. This increase took effect on October 7, 2024. One Stamford round trip was restored, with South Norwalk no longer a stop. The M8 cars were replaced by the previous diesel-powered trains in 2026. Two weekday round trips were added on October 5, 2026, bringing the service to 12 weekday round trips versus the 18 operated pre-COVID.

== Proposed expansion ==
=== Extensions ===
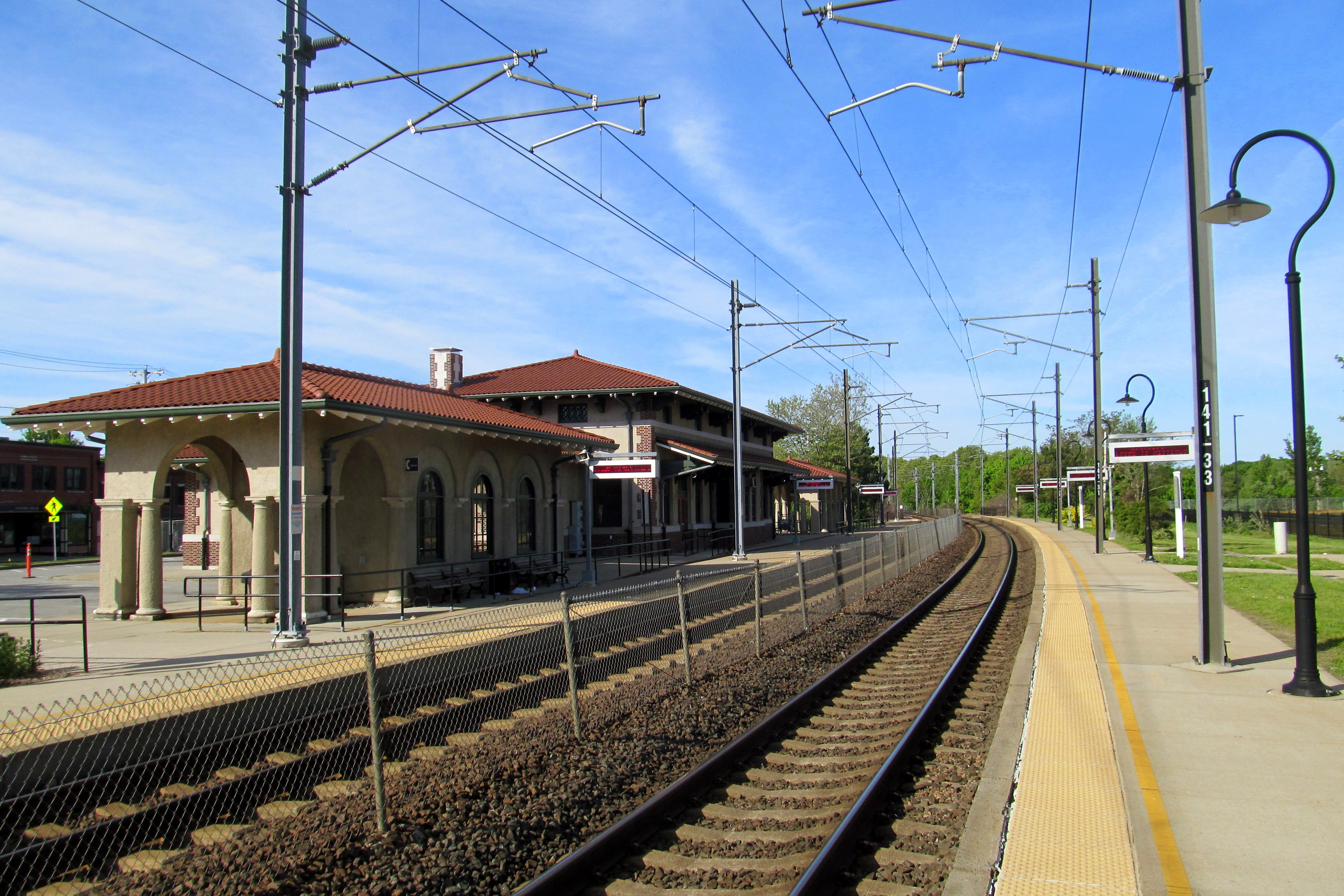
Westerly station is a possible future eastbound terminus of Shore Line East service.

The possibility of extending service eastward and/or northward from New London has been considered at several points. In a 2001 report examining commuter rail for Rhode Island, the Rhode Island Department of Transportation (RIDOT) considered an extension of Shore Line East to Providence via Westerly (effectively restoring the Clamdigger service). Ultimately, MBTA Commuter Rail service, which already ran to Providence as part of the Providence/Stoughton Line, was extended southward instead (although only to Wickford Junction). However, both RIDOT and SLE have long-term plans to extend their services to meet at Westerly. Extending SLE service would require negotiations with the US Coast Guard, the Marine Trades Association, and other stakeholders for increased use of the Thames River Bridge and the Mystic River Bridge. As part of Malloy's 2015 30-year transit plan, Shore Line East was to be extended to Westerly at a cost of $200 million. In February 2016, the state public transportation commission issued a report recommending extension of Shore Line East rail service to Mystic and Westerly as soon as possible.

In 2021, state lawmakers allocated $2.3 million for CTDOT to study an eastward extension to Westerly. Released in 2023, the study indicated that extending 12 weekday round trips to Westerly would have a capital cost of at least $245 million and additional annual operating costs of $25 million. With intermediate stops at Groton, Mystic, and Stonington, the service was estimated to attract 159,300 annual riders. The study also analyzed potential service to Norwich via the Palmer Line (New England Central Railroad mainline) with intermediate stations at Connecticut College/U.S. Coast Guard Academy and Mohegan Sun. Capital costs were estimated as at least $636 million and annual operating costs at $6.8 million, with 8-10 weekday round trips attracting 126,400 annual riders. Alternate expansion of Southeast Area Transit bus service serving both corridors was estimated to have capital costs of $9-10 million and annual operating costs of $4.1 million, with an additional 303,000 annual riders.

=== East Lyme infill station ===
In April 2012, state officials released a report detailing possible sites for an infill station in East Lyme. Four sites were analyzed – two near downtown Niantic and two at Rocky Neck State Park. (Niantic station had previously been a stop on the Clamdigger.) As part of a 2015 bonding proposal made by then-governor Malloy, $750,000 was to be allocated for a new station at Niantic.

== Rolling stock ==
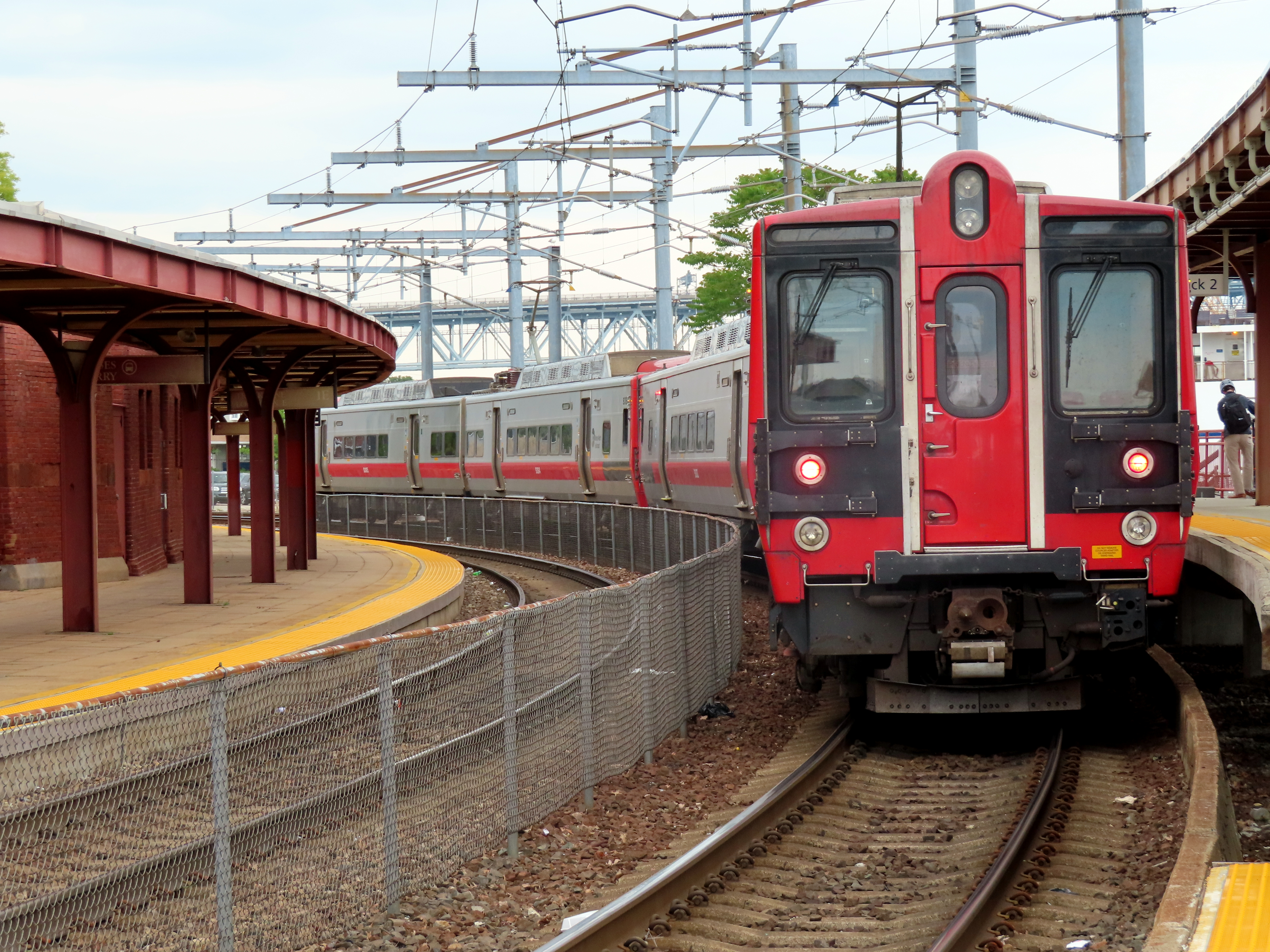
Kawasaki M8 railcars, seen here at New London, were used for all SLE service from 2022 to 2026.

Shore Line East service uses EMD GP40-3H and GE P40DC Genesis diesel locomotives and Mafersa coaches. This state-owned equipment is shared with the Hartford Line. SLE operated diesel service from 1990 to 2022, as Amtrak had not yet electrified the Northeast Corridor between New Haven and Boston at the time service began. Initial service used two F7 locomotives and ten Pullman-Standard coaches purchased from Pittsburgh's PATrain for $1.7 million. In 1991, CTDOT purchased 10 Bombardier Shoreliner III coaches, similar to ones already used on the Danbury Branch and Waterbury Branch, and leased three additional diesel locomotives: two EMD GP38s and one EMD GP7. In 1994, Amtrak rebuilt 11 of CTDOT's surplus SPV-2000 diesel railcars into coaches, dubbed "Constitution Liners."

In 1996, SLE took delivery of six remanufactured GP40-2H diesels to replace the entire motive power fleet. These were supplemented in 2005 with eight P40DC diesels leased from Amtrak. CTDOT purchased the P40DCs in 2008. To augment capacity CTDOT acquired 33 Mafersa coaches from the Virginia Railway Express in 2004. These began entering service in 2006, displacing the Shoreliners and Constitution Liners.

CTDOT acquired an additional four GE P40DC locomotives from New Jersey Transit in 2015. Originally built for Amtrak in 1993, these locomotives had been used by NJ Transit on the short-lived Atlantic City Express Service. In January 2018, ConnDOT awarded a contract to Amtrak to overhaul all twelve P40DC locomotives at the Beech Grove Shops. The first unit was completed in early 2021. The GP40-2H locomotives were sent to NRE for rebuilding in 2017 and 2018, followed by use on the new Hartford Line service.

From 2022 to 2026, Shore Line East used four-car trains of state-owned Kawasaki M8 electric multiple units. These cars were part of a larger fleet, jointly owned by the state and the Metropolitan Transportation Authority, that operated on the Metro-North Railroad New Haven Line and New Canaan Branch. The M8 cars replaced push-pull diesel-powered trains on May 24, 2022. In 2007, CTDOT proposed to use up to 32 M8 cars in SLE service as far as Old Saybrook; the diesel equipment would then be used on the Hartford Line and for use with low platforms on New London / Mystic / Westerly service. Amtrak crew qualification of M8 electric multiple units on Shore Line East took place in April 2022; testing had previously taken place as early as 2015.

In February 2026, CTDOT indicated possible plans to replace the M8 cars with diesel trains to save $8.8 million annually due to the cost of purchasing electricity from Amtrak. The change took effect later in 2026 after approval by the state legislature.

== Stations ==
All stations are accessible.

Location	Station	Miles (km) from GCT	SLE service began	Rail connections
Stamford	Stamford	33.1 (53.3)	December 17, 2001	Amtrak: Northeast Regional, Acela, Vermonter; Metro-North Railroad: New Haven Line, New Canaan Branch, Danbury Branch
Bridgeport	Bridgeport	55.4 (89.2)	December 17, 2001	Amtrak: Northeast Regional, Vermonter; Metro-North Railroad: New Haven Line, Waterbury Branch
Stratford	Stratford	59.0 (95.0)	December 17, 2001	Metro-North Railroad: New Haven Line
Milford	Milford	63.3 (101.9)	December 17, 2001	Metro-North Railroad: New Haven Line
West Haven	West Haven	69.4 (111.7)	August 18, 2013	Metro-North Railroad: New Haven Line
New Haven	Union Station	72.3 (116.4)	May 29, 1990	Amtrak: Northeast Regional, Acela, Vermonter, Hartford Line, Valley Flyer; Metro-North Railroad: New Haven Line; CT Rail: Hartford Line
New Haven	State Street	72.7 (117.0)	June 7, 2002	Amtrak: Northeast Regional, Hartford Line, Valley Flyer; Metro-North Railroad: New Haven Line; CT Rail: Hartford Line
Branford	Branford	81.4 (131.0)	May 29, 1990	
Guilford	Guilford	88.8 (142.9)	May 29, 1990	
Madison	Madison	93.1 (149.8)	May 29, 1990	
Clinton	Clinton	96.8 (155.8)	May 29, 1990	
Westbrook	Westbrook	101.2 (162.9)	May 29, 1990	
Old Saybrook	Old Saybrook	105.1 (169.1)	May 29, 1990	Amtrak: Northeast Regional
New London	New London	122.9 (197.8)	February 1, 1996	Amtrak: Northeast Regional
