= East Washington Avenue Bridge =

Bridge in United States of America

- Coordinates: 41.1861°N 73.1888°W
- Locale: Bridgeport, Connecticut
- Official name: East Washington Avenue Bridge
- CT bridge number: 4252

Characteristics
- Total length: 203 feet (62 m)

History
- Opened: Original: 1836; Second: Unknown; Third: 1925; Fourth: 1998
- Closed: Original: Unknown; Second: 1917; Third: 1990s

Statistics
- Daily traffic: 1000 (in 2007)

Location
- Interactive map of East Washington Avenue Bridge

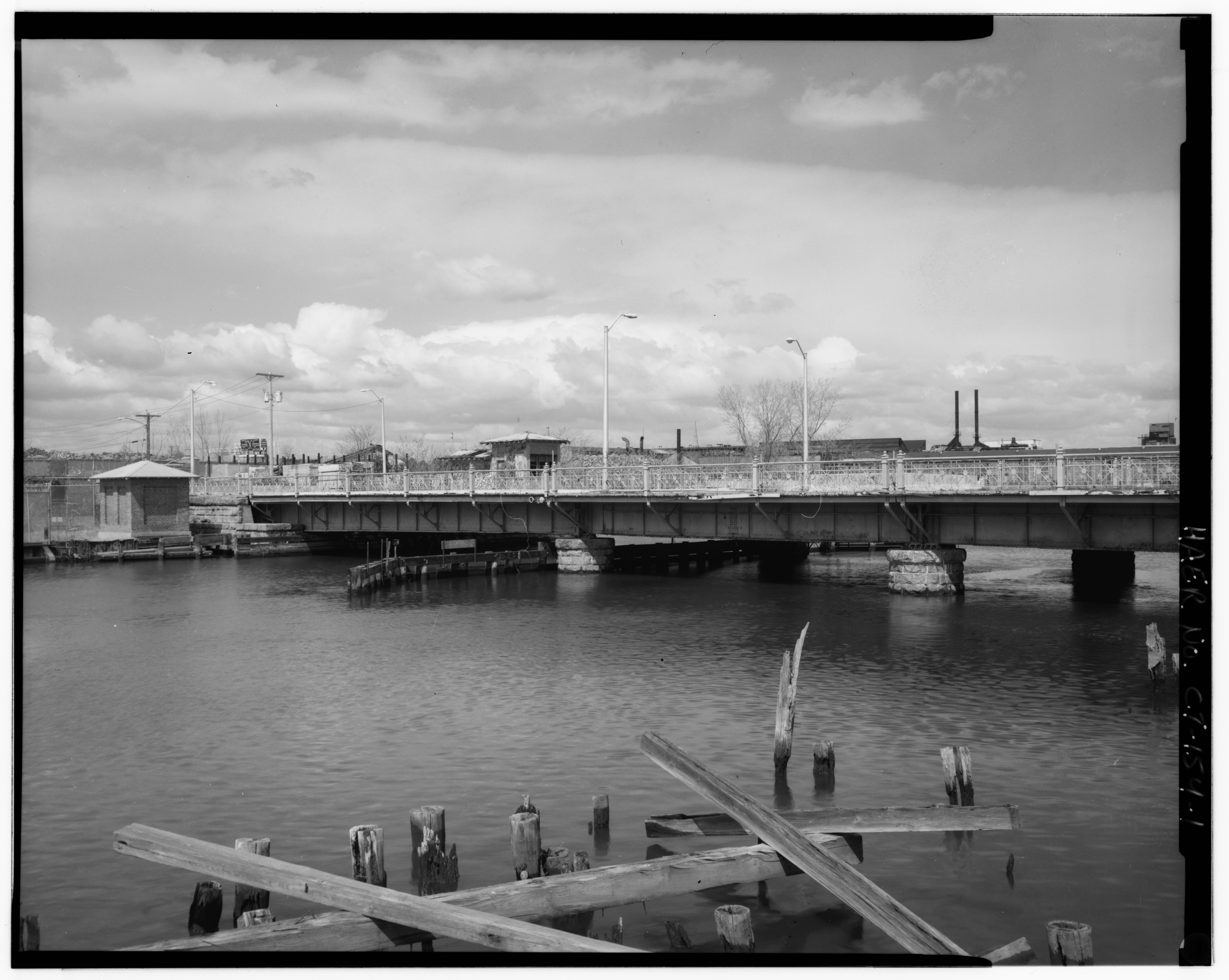
View northwest of south elevation

The East Washington Avenue Bridge refers to the bridges that have connected East Washington Avenue over the Pequonnock River in Bridgeport, Connecticut. Records state that a bridge was first constructed on the site in 1836, but no description of the bridge has been found. The second bridge was a truss swing design and underwent heavy repair and modernization in 1893. The third design was a movable Strauss underneath-counter weight deck-girder bascule bridge. The plans were drafted by James A. McElroy, using Joseph B. Strauss's design in 1916. However, construction was delayed for years because of a dispute with the contractor and a lack of funds. The bridge was completed by Bridgeport Dry Dock and Dredging when the State of Connecticut appropriated $350,000 to erect the bridge. Completed in 1925, the bridge underwent several modifications throughout its service life. On July 26, 1983, the bridge was closed after it was found to be in danger of collapse. It reopened after repair, but was closed in the 1990s before being replaced with a modern bascule bridge in 1998. In 2010, the report listed the deck and superstructure conditions as "Good" and the substructure condition as "Satisfactory".

== Original bridge ==
The East Washington Avenue Bridge serves an area that was previously known as Pembroke, the name stemming from the 1650s, that grew to become a prosperous agricultural community. East of Pembroke was the village of Newfield, which was chartered as the borough of Bridgeport in 1800. In 1821, it became the township of Bridgeport before being chartered as a city in 1836. The need for the bridge arose when Reverend Birdsey Noble purchased 50 acres from Senator Wright; with the intention of selling housing lots. The location of the bridge was originally planned to be one quarter of a mile to the south, but it was changed through public opposition, and a toll bridge was constructed in 1836. The description of this bridge and details of its service life and replacement have not been found in records.

== Second bridge ==
The design of the second East Washington Avenue Bridge is unknown, but the survey in 1916 for its replacement documented a cantilever through truss swing that was 184 ft (56 m) long. The bridge was heavily repaired and remodeled in 1893, around this same period a trolley line was added. Two decades later, the bridge needed to be replaced and restrictions were made to extend the service life of the bridge, with trolleys, then heavy trucks being banned. The bridge's service life ended in 1917 with its closure.

== Third bridge ==
The City of Bridgeport appointed a bridge commission to replace the aging East Washington Avenue Bridge on December 7, 1915. The commission chose a Joseph B. Strauss's patented design from the Strauss Bascule Bridge Company of Chicago, Illinois. The city engineer James A. McElroy drew up the plans for the bridge's specifications and the plans were completed on February 17, 1916. The steel for the construction was ordered from the Penn Bridge Company. The project was suspended because of a dispute with the contractor and a lack of funds to erect the bridge, but in 1923 the State of Connecticut appropriated $350,000 to complete the project. Only two bids for the bridge's erection were placed, the first by Bridgeport Dry Dock and Dredging for $326,575 and the second by C. W. Blakeslee and Sons for $389,492 with estimations varying based on extra work needed. Bridgeport Dry Dock and Dredging won the contract and the materials were shipped to Bridgeport, with work beginning mid-1924. The completed bridge included an operator's house and a public toilet building. The bridge, costing over $550,000 in total, was turned over to the city on October 14, 1925.

=== Service life ===
The original bascule deck of creosote-impregnated yellow pine and the spruce plank sidewalks were replaced with concrete in the early 1940s. In 1960, the original fender system was replaced. In June 1968, the ornamental lamps were replaced with modern street lights. A 1979 inspection of the bridge found it listed in "poor condition" and recommended repairs totaling $820,000 to be completed by 1985. A 1980 report by the Connecticut Department of Transportation listed the East Washington Avenue bridge as 1 of the 127 bridges in "poor condition"; requiring "immediate" repair. The report defines "poor condition" as serviceable and not in danger of collapse. The Hartford Courant states that the 1979 report went unnoticed for four years and another inspection was carried out in 1982; also listing the bridge in "poor condition".

After the Mianus River Bridge collapsed on June 29, 1983, a state-wide assessment of bridges began. An engineering firm, Flaherty and Giavara, reported that a critical beam had nearly rusted through, prompting the bridge's closure. Bridgeport's mayor Leonard S. Paoletta said "the bridge could [collapse] at any moment." The bridge was closed on July 26, 1983, around 3 p.m. Eastern Standard Time as a response to Flaherty and Giavara's report. Repairs were completed and the bridge was reopened on August 10, 1983. The repairs billed at $5,000 were a temporary solution and the bridge was slated to close in February 1984 when $1.5 million in funds were unavailable.

== Current bridge ==
The bridge was closed in the 1990s and a replacement bridge was required. In 1998, the demolition and construction of a modern bascule bridge replaced the previous East Washington Avenue Bridge. The railings were upgraded and the original operator's house and connected toilet-building were restored. In 2010, the current state of the bridge listed the deck and superstructure conditions as "Good" and the substructure condition as "Satisfactory". In 2013, the East Washington Avenue Bridge was described by officials as rarely opening to accommodate marine traffic.

== See also ==
- List of bridges documented by the Historic American Engineering Record in Connecticut
- List of movable bridges in Connecticut
