= Norwalk River Railroad Bridge =

- U.S. National Register of Historic Places
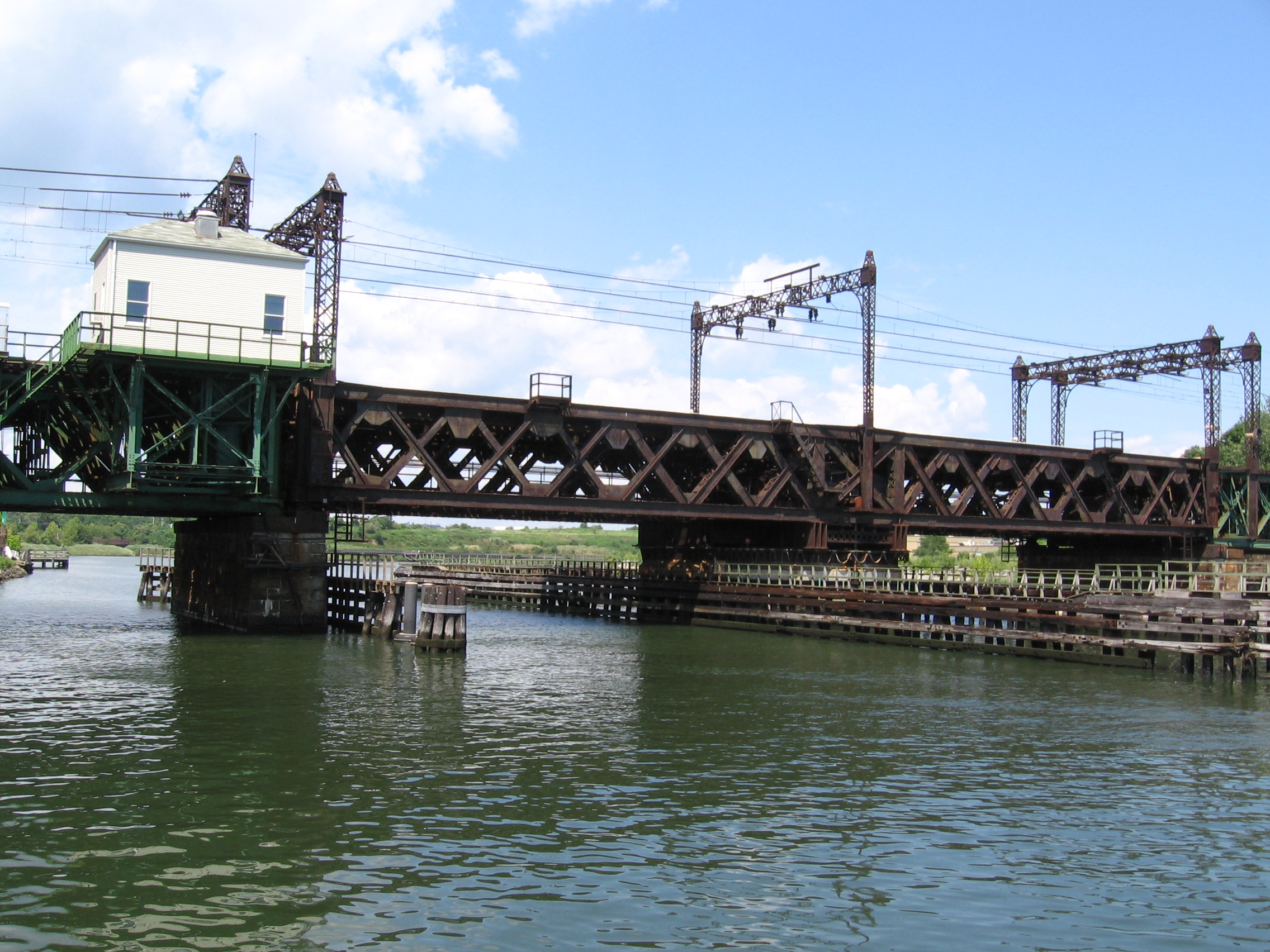
- Norwalk River Railroad Bridge in 2007
- Location: Norwalk, Connecticut
- Coordinates: 41°6′2″N 73°24′57″W
- Area: 1 acre (0.40 ha)
- Built: 1896
- Architectural style: Rim Bearing, Swing
- MPS: Movable Railroad Bridges on the NE Corridor in Connecticut TR
- NRHP reference No.: 87000844
- Added to NRHP: June 12, 1987

The Norwalk River Railroad Bridge (also known as the WALK Bridge) is a swing bridge built in 1896 for the New York, New Haven and Hartford Railroad. It currently carries Amtrak and Metro-North Railroad trains over the Norwalk River.

== History ==
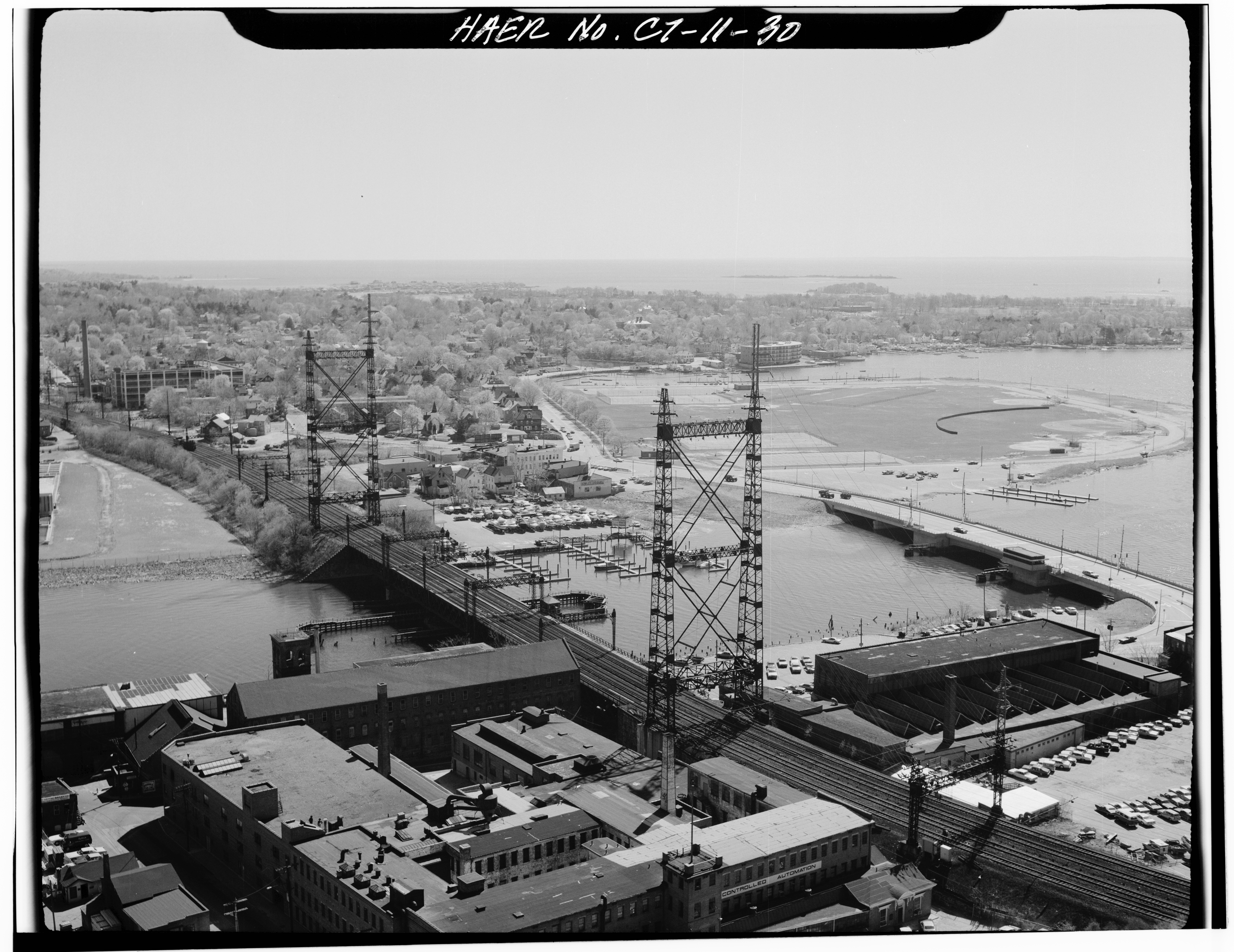
The bridge in 1977

The current swing bridge is located at the same site where, in 1853, a train from New York City plummeted into the river while the previous swing bridge was open, resulting in dozens of deaths. In 1896, the New Haven Railroad built the bridge and widened its route to four tracks, as it simultaneously built its South Norwalk Railroad Bridge over the intersection of Washington Street with North Main and South Main streets. The 562-foot (171 m) span, with a rotating swing span 202 feet (62 m) long was provided by the Berlin Iron Bridge Co. This type of swing bridge is one of just two on the Northeast Corridor. The swing span has a rim-bearing system of 96 rollers, allowing tall vessels to pass by. The span is one of only 13 of the company's bridges (and one of only two railroad bridges) that survive in the state as of August 2001. In 1907, the rail line was electrified with overhead catenary wires, which form a prominent feature of the bridge today. It is or was also known as Norwalk River Bridge. It was added to the National Register of Historic Places in 1987. Before 2020, the bridge had a daily traffic of 125,000 passengers and 175 trains.

=== Replacement ===
As a single movable span with aging mechanical mechanisms, the Norwalk River Bridge represented a frequent point of failure for Amtrak and Metro-North service. The failures caused delays up and down the Northeast Corridor, which connects Boston to New York, Philadelphia, and Washington D.C. As a result, it has been targeted for replacement with dual movable spans. The final design approved for the new WALK Bridge calls for a dual-span vertical-lift bridge. Construction on the new bridge began on May 12, 2023, and is expected to be completed in 2030. Amtrak was awarded $465 million in Infrastructure Investment and Jobs Act funds in November 2023. Amtrak will contribute an additional $27 million, while the state of Connecticut will provide $87 million.

Officials at a September 9, 2026, press conference in Norwalk display a rendering of the replacement WALK Bridge, with one of the 234-foot utility towers slated for removal visible in the background.

In September 2026, work began to remove the two 234-foot-tall utility towers and overhead wire systems. The towers were a prominent feature of the Norwalk city skyline for generations.

== See also ==
- National Register of Historic Places listings in Fairfield County, Connecticut
- List of bridges on the National Register of Historic Places in Connecticut
