= Connecticut River Bridge (Northeast Corridor) =

Railroad bridge in Connecticut, US

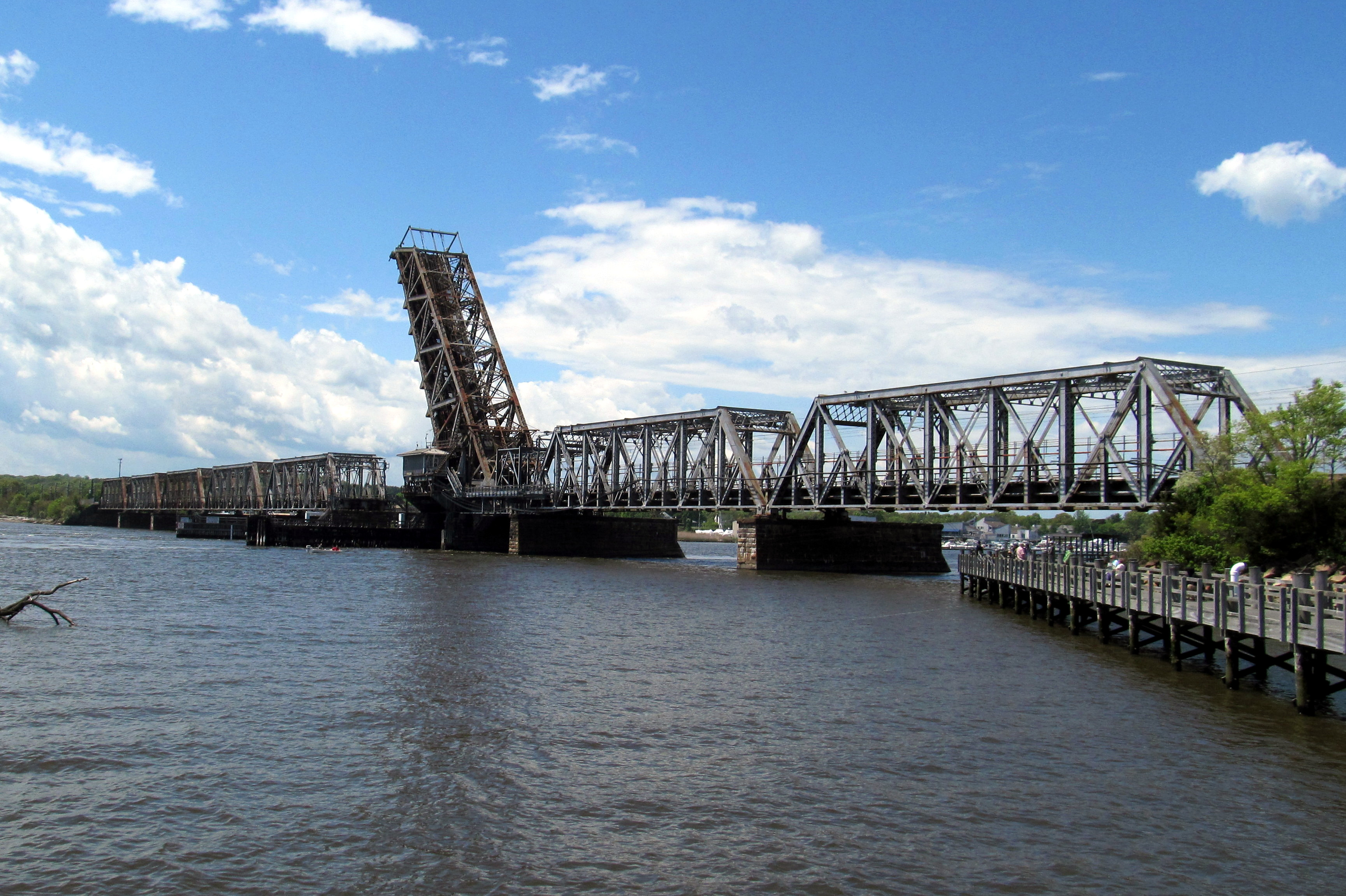
- The bridge with its draw span open in May 2014
- Coordinates: 41.3108°N 72.3492°W
- Carries: Two railroad tracks with overhead lines (Northeast Corridor)
- Crosses: Connecticut River
- Locale: Old Saybrook and Old Lyme, Connecticut
- Owner: Amtrak

Characteristics
- Design: Baltimore truss bridge with a bascule span
- Material: Steel
- Total length: 1,659.6 feet (505.8 m)
- Longest span: 161 feet (49 m)
- No. of spans: 9 fixed + 1 bascule
- Clearance below: 18 feet (5.5 m) (closed); 68 feet (21 m) (open)

History
- Designer: Scherzer Rolling Lift Bridge Company, Chicago
- Construction end: 1907

Statistics
- Daily traffic: 58 daily trains: 38 Amtrak intercity trains 14 Shore Line East commuter trains 6 P&W freight trains

Location
- Interactive map of Connecticut River Bridge

The Connecticut River Bridge is a railroad bridge that carries the Northeast Corridor over the Connecticut River between Old Saybrook and Old Lyme, Connecticut. It is the southernmost crossing of the river before it reaches Long Island Sound; it is just south of the Raymond E. Baldwin Bridge that carries Interstate 95. The bridge is a truss bridge with a bascule span, allowing boat traffic to pass through. The bridge is owned by Amtrak; it is used by Amtrak Northeast Regional and Acela intercity trains, Shore Line East local trains, and Providence and Worcester Railroad freight trains. A $1.3 billion replacement bridge began construction in 2024 with completion scheduled for 2031.

== History ==
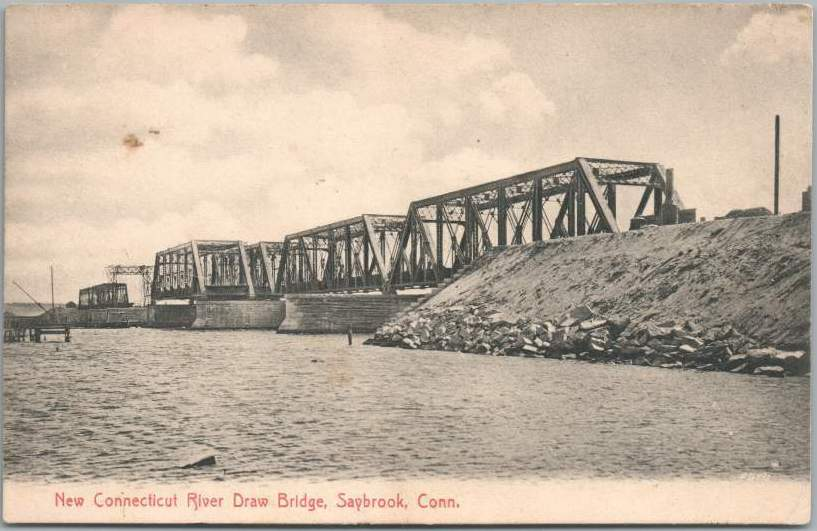
1907 postcard of the bridge

The bridge was built in 1907 by the Scherzer Rolling Lift Bridge Company of Chicago for the New York, New Haven and Hartford Railroad. It replaced an earlier bridge, which was built in 1870 and rebuilt on the same piers in 1889. The old single-track bridge was no longer able to handle the train frequency and weights that the New Haven wished to run. Construction of the new bridge began in May 1905, and the substructure was completed in April 1906. The bridge was built with two-track spans, with the abutments long enough for a second set of spans should quadruple-tracking of the line take place. The new bridge opened on August 6, 1907.

The bridge underwent a structural rehabilitation in 1976, and had mechanical and electrical rehabilitation in 1981 and 1997. In 2000 the bridge experienced a major electrical failure which rendered the drawspan stuck in the open position (blocking railroad traffic). The bridge became stuck in the closed position twice in 2001. A 2006 inspection found the bridge to be structurally deficient and determined that periodic rehabilitation work was no longer sufficient to keep the century-old bridge functional. The bridge was determined to be eligible for listing on the National Register of Historic Places in 1987, but it was not finally listed due to owner objection.

=== Replacement ===
The structurally deficient bridge is planned for replacement. An Environmental Assessment released in May 2014 identified two preferred alternatives: a bascule bridge similar in size to the existing span, or a vertical lift bridge with possibly increased clearances. Either option would be built on a parallel alignment just south of the existing bridge. Fully high-level designs without movable sections were eliminated from consideration due to the massive approaches that would have to be built, which would have major impacts on nearby wetlands and increase construction and land acquisition costs. Construction staging plans were released in April 2020. Those plans call for a replacement bascule bridge 52 feet (16 m) south of the existing span, with clearance in the closed position increased from 18 feet (5.5 m) to 24 feet (7.3 m). Operating speed will increase from 45 miles per hour (72 km/h) over the existing bridge to 70 miles per hour (110 km/h) over the new bridge.

Amtrak and CTDOT were awarded $65.2 million in federal funds for the replacement in October 2020. By October 2022, Amtrak planned to begin the procurement process in early 2023 and award the construction contract later that year. Construction was to begin in early 2024. In mid-2023, Amtrak applied for a federal grant to replace the bridge. Amtrak was awarded $827 million in Infrastructure Investment and Jobs Act funds in November 2023. Amtrak will contribute an additional $148 million, while the state of Connecticut will provide $58 million. Amtrak awarded the construction contract to a joint venture of O&G and Tutor Perini in June 2024. Total project cost is expected to be $1.3 billion. Construction began in September 2024, with completion expected in 2031.

== See also ==
- List of crossings of the Connecticut River
