= Saugatuck River Railroad Bridge =

- U.S. National Register of Historic Places
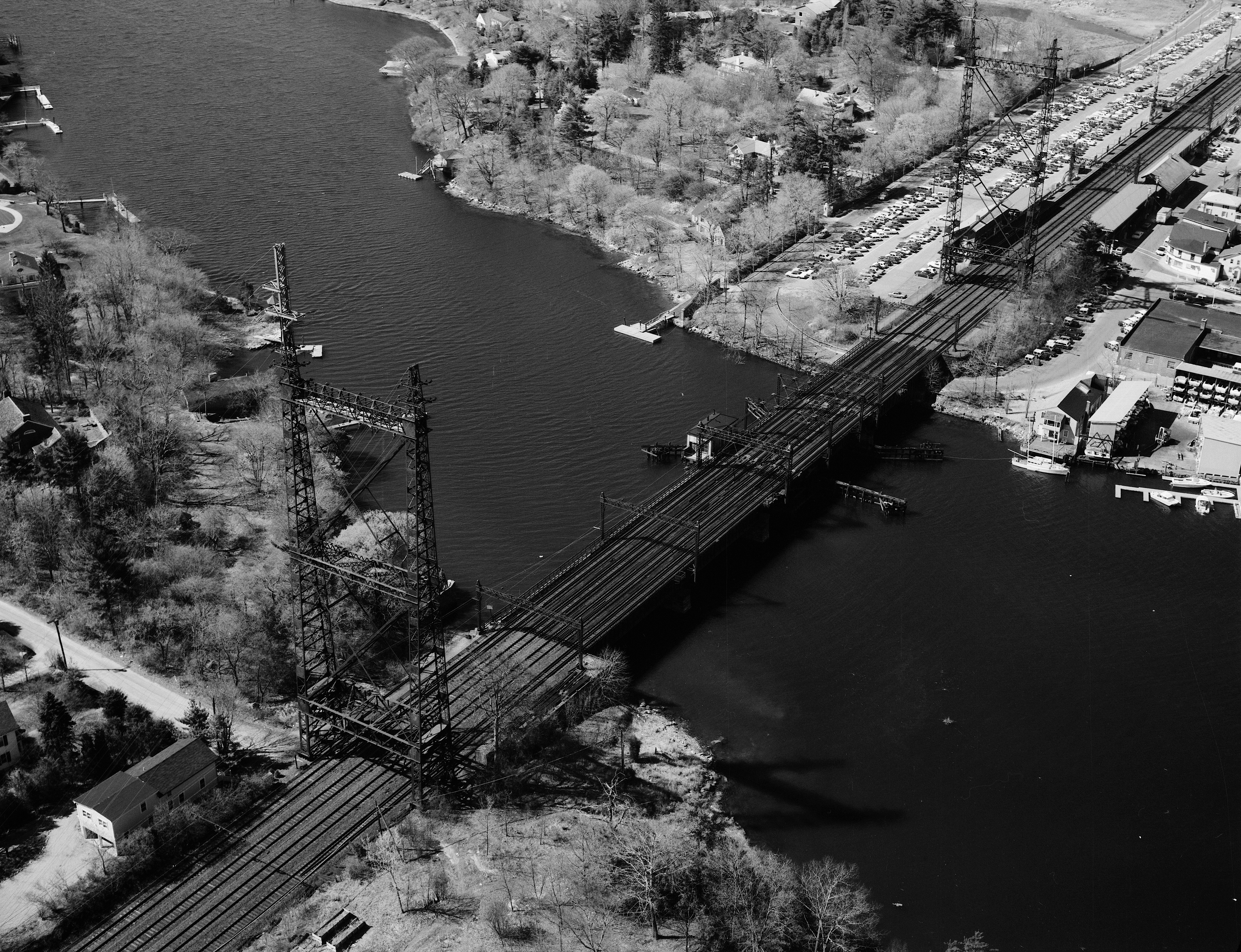
- Saugatuck River Railroad Bridge
- Location: Westport, Connecticut
- Coordinates: 41°7′10″N 73°22′8″W
- Area: 1 acre (0.40 ha)
- Built: 1905
- Architectural style: Deck Girder, Bascule
- MPS: Movable Railroad Bridges on the NE Corridor in Connecticut TR
- NRHP reference No.: 87000846
- Added to NRHP: June 12, 1987

The Saugatuck River Railroad Bridge, also known as Saugatuck River Bridge, is a railroad bridge carrying trackage of Metro-North Railroad's New Haven Line over the Saugatuck River in Westport, Connecticut. It is one of eight moveable bridges on the Amtrak Northeast Corridor route through Connecticut. It was built in 1905 for the New York, New Haven and Hartford Railroad. The bridge is a single leaf Scherzer rolling lift bascule bridge.

== Replacement Project ==
Amtrak was awarded up to $23.2 million in Infrastructure Investment and Jobs Act funds in November 2023 for early design of a replacement for the span. Amtrak will contribute an additional $1.6 million, while the state of Connecticut will provide $4.2 million. The replacement bridge is being designed for a top speed of 90 mph (140 km/h), up from the current 45 mph (72 km/h) limit on the existing bridge.

== See also ==
- Saugatuck River Bridge, a road bridge which is also NRHP-listed
- National Register of Historic Places listings in Fairfield County, Connecticut
- List of bridges on the National Register of Historic Places in Connecticut
