= Thames River Bridge (Amtrak) =

Bridge in Connecticut

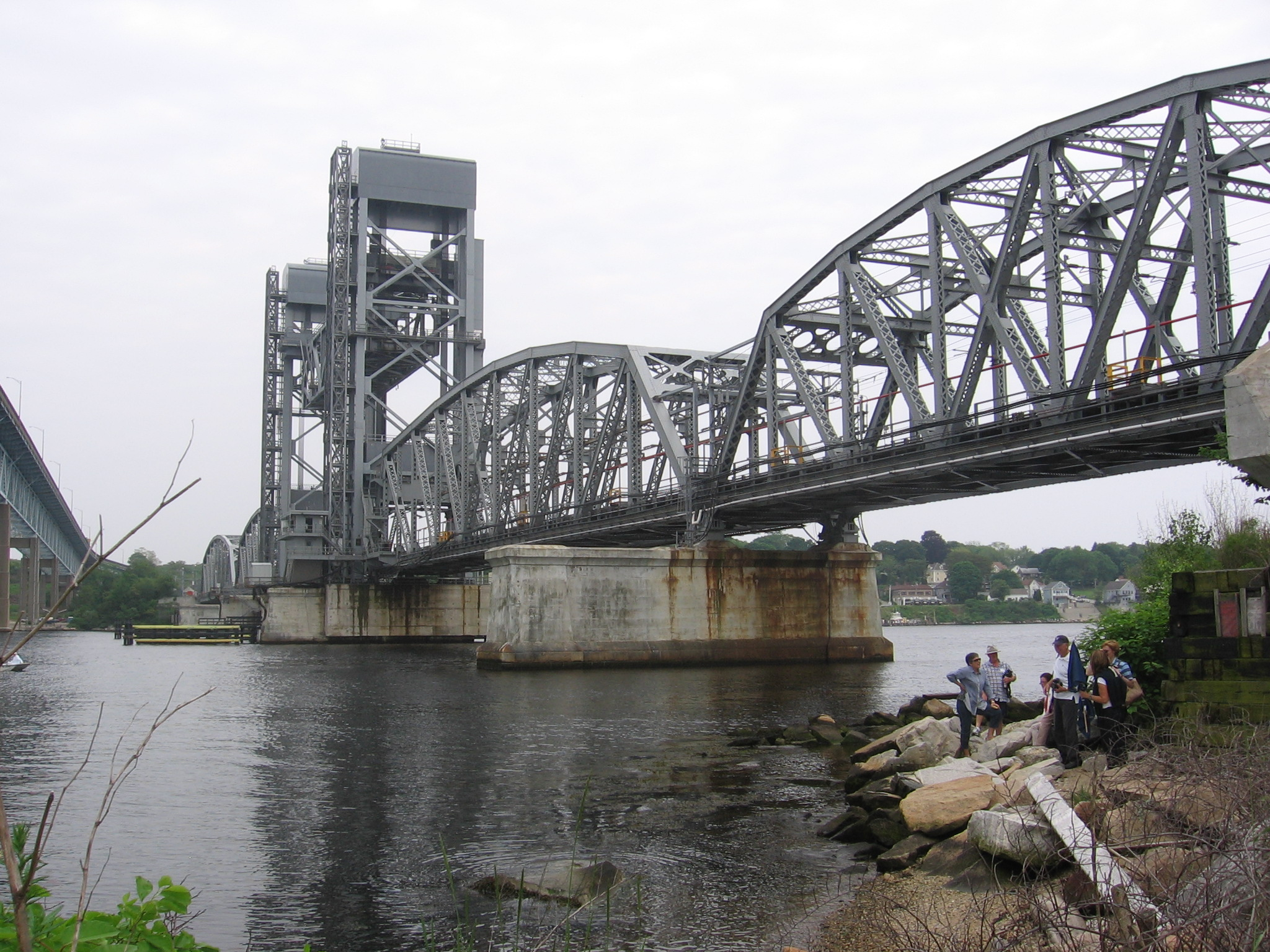
- Looking east along the bridge, May 26, 2012
- Coordinates: 41°21′47″N 72°05′15″W
- Carries: Two railroad tracks
- Crosses: Thames River
- Locale: New London, Connecticut and Groton, Connecticut
- Official name: Thames River Bridge
- Maintained by: Amtrak

Characteristics
- Design: Truss with bascule opening (opening converted to vertical lift)
- Material: Steel
- Total length: 1,389 feet (423 m)
- Clearance below: 29 feet (8.8 m) (vertical lift lowered) 135 feet (41 m) (vertical lift raised)

History
- Opened: 1919; Replaced 2008

Location
- Interactive map of Thames River Bridge

Amtrak's Thames River Bridge spans the Thames River between New London and Groton, Connecticut.

== Design and history ==
The bridge was originally a Strauss heel-trunnion Warren through-truss bascule design, built in 1919. It was built by the American Bridge Company for the New York, New Haven and Hartford Railroad, replacing a span dating from 1889. In June 2008, the bridge underwent replacement which included the span's conversion from a bascule to a vertical-lift mechanism.

As built in 1919, the bridge's abutments and piers were designed to carry a second set of double-track spans, in the event that an expansion to four tracks was ever undertaken at this location by the New Haven Railroad (it never was).

== Operation ==
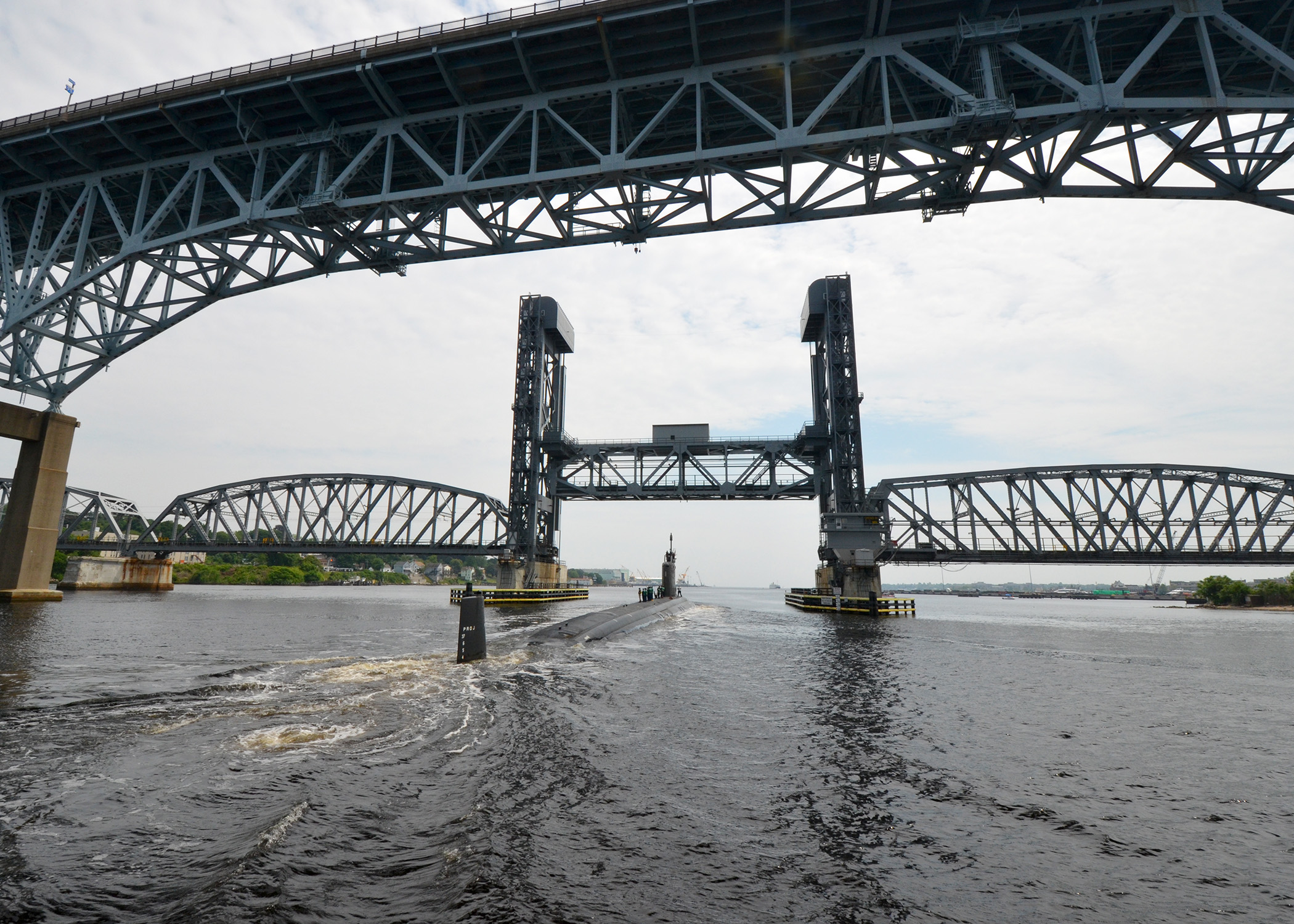
The Virginia-class attack submarine USS Missouri (SSN 780) heads towards the Thames River Bridge as it departs Naval Submarine Base New London for a scheduled deployment.

The bridge opens for marine traffic more than four times per day and serves up to 36 passenger trains and two freight trains per day. The bridge sits 29 feet (8.8 m) above mean high water (MHW), and the vertical lift span opens to 135 feet (41 m) above MHW and provides 105 feet (32 m) of horizontal clearance.

It is one of eight moveable bridges on the Northeast Corridor through Connecticut surveyed in one multiple-property study in 1986.

== See also ==
- List of bridges documented by the Historic American Engineering Record in Connecticut
