= Westbrook station (Connecticut) =

Railway station in Westbrook, CT

Westbrook
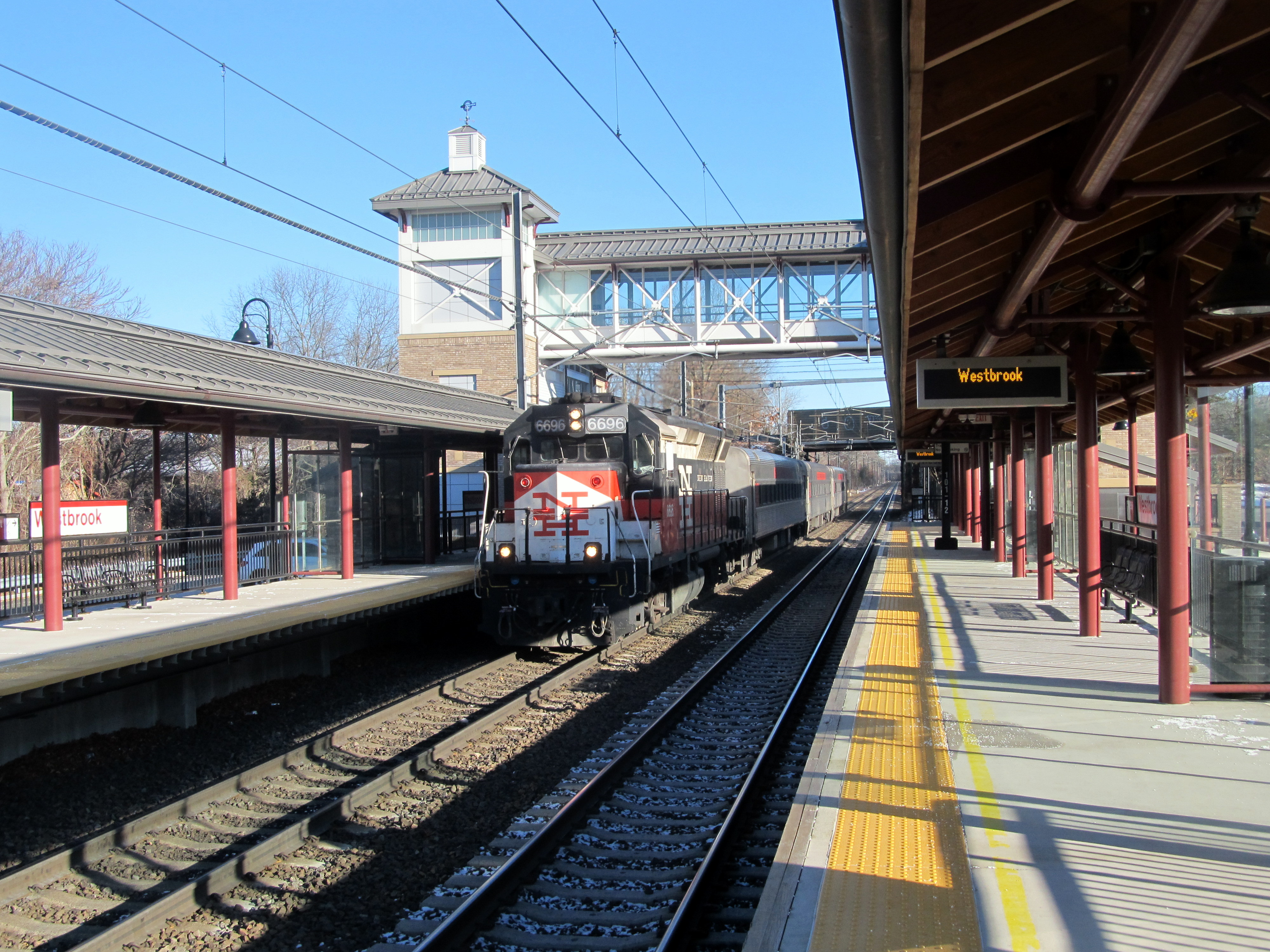
- A westbound Shore Line East train at Westbrook station in 2017

General information
- Location: Norris Avenue and Essex Road; Westbrook, Connecticut
- Coordinates: 41.2888°N 72.4479°W
- Owner: ConnDOT
- Line: Amtrak Northeast Corridor
- Platforms: 2 side platforms
- Tracks: 2
- Connections: Estuary Transit District

Construction
- Parking: 210 spaces
- Accessible: Yes

Other information
- Station code: Amtrak: WSB

History
- Opened: 1852 (NH&NL); May 29, 1990 (SLE)
- Closed: April 1936 (NYNH&H)
- Rebuilt: January 15, 2001; March 25, 2014

Passengers
- 2019: 62 daily boardings

Services
Preceding station	CT Rail	Following station
Clinton toward New Haven Union Station or Stamford	Shore Line East	Old Saybrook toward New London
Former services
Preceding station	New York, New Haven and Hartford Railroad	Following station
Clinton toward New Haven	Shore Line	Old Saybrook toward Boston
Location

Westbrook station is a regional rail station on the Northeast Corridor, located off Connecticut Route 153 just north of the village center of Westbrook, Connecticut. It is served by the CT Rail's Shore Line East commuter rail service; Amtrak's Acela and Northeast Regional services run through the station without stopping. Westbrook has two high-level side platforms, each two cars long.

The first Westbrook station opened in 1852, was replaced in 1906, and closed in 1936. A new station for Shore Line East opened in 1990; and was rebuilt in 2001. A new station with a larger lot and two accessible platforms opened on March 25, 2014. The larger lot now allows the station, which is less than half a mile from Interstate 95 and U.S. Route 1, to serve as a park-and-ride station.

== History ==
=== New Haven Railroad ===
1852-built Westbrook station in 1916. The structure still stands and operates as a sports bar.

The New Haven & New London Railroad was chartered in 1848, began construction in 1850, and opened for service in July 1852. A station was located on the north side of the tracks off Essex Road (the modern location) just north of downtown Westbrook. The line was owned by the New York, Providence and Boston Railroad (the "Stonington Road") from 1858 to 1862, and by the Shore Line Railway from 1864 until it was acquired by the New York, New Haven, and Hartford Railroad (the "New Haven") in 1870. The original 1852-built Westbrook combination depot still stands just north of the tracks at the original site, although it has been turned and moved slightly back from the tracks. A NYP&B emblem from the 1858-1862 ownership was formerly displayed on one end of the building.

The 1852 depot was replaced in 1905–06 by a station building similar to Mystic, no longer extant, located on the south side of the tracks. The new station was locally popular, with the Hartford Courant calling it a "beauty" versus the "barnlike" original. However, the stop at Westbrook was discontinued in April 1936. The station building was demolished several years afterwards, possibly by the 1938 New England Hurricane.

The New Haven continued local service along the route east of New Haven ceased until January 1, 1969, after the New Haven merged into Penn Central. The once-daily Clamdigger and Beacon Hill which continued to serve the route until 1981 did not stop at Westbrook due to its relatively small population and proximity to Old Saybrook. A siding north of the station buildings formerly served the gravel yard located there.

=== Shore Line East ===
The modern Westbrook station opened at the beginning of Shore Line East service on May 29, 1990. A small low-level platform and parking lot were located at the modern station location on the north side of the tracks. A small crossing was constructed to allow passengers to board trains on the southern track. In 2001, when the Acela Express began service, a safety precaution went into effect that disallowed passengers from crossing the tracks. A new platform and parking lot were constructed across the tracks, allowing all Shore Line East trains to safely serve passengers on the southern track. The southside platform and lot opened on January 15, 2001.

==== New station ====
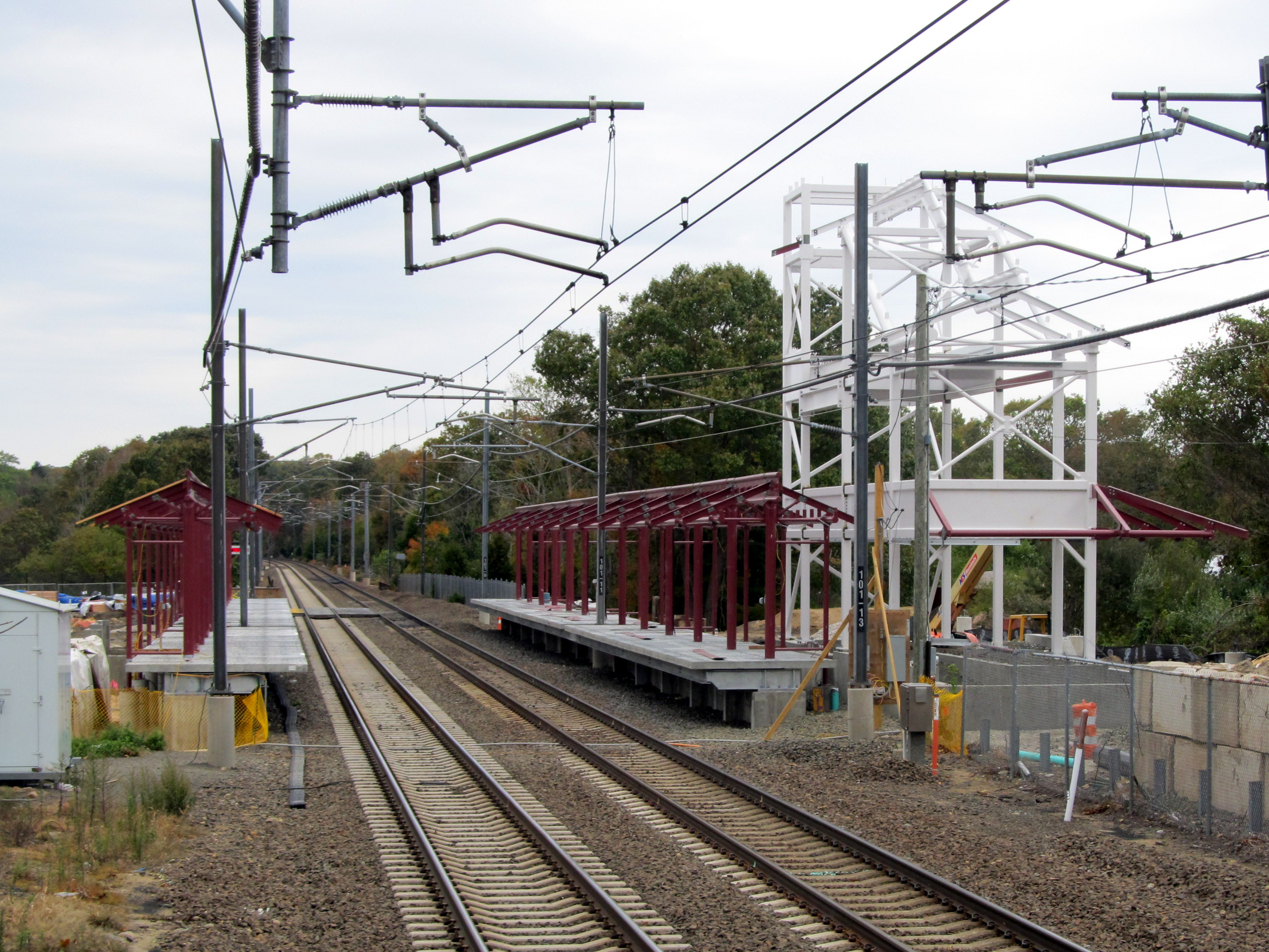
Construction in October 2012

The original 1990 Shore Line East stations were built before the Americans with Disabilities Act was signed and had low-level platforms that were not handicapped accessible. A 2003 agreement between the Connecticut Department of Transportation (which operates Shore Line East) and Amtrak (who owns the tracks) included a requirement that all Shore Line East stations have second platforms added before Shore Line East service could be increased. Having two platforms allows SLE trains to use both tracks, providing greater operational flexibility. Clinton, Madison, and Branford were rebuilt between 2005 and 2008 with a high-level platform and provisions for a second, while Old Saybrook and Guilford were rebuilt in 2001 and 2005 with two platforms each. However, Westbrook was not rebuilt due to delays with a land swap between the Connecticut Department of Transportation and the town of Westbrook, which was necessary to allow the rebuilding.

The swap, in which the state traded a parcel of land on Route 145 for the town's garage site off Norris Avenue (which became part of the expanded parking lot), was begun in 2004 and mostly agreed to in late 2005, but was not finalized until 2006 when the state agreed to pay $1.5 million for the town to build a new garage on the Route 145 site. Town highway operations were moved to the Route 145 site in September 2011, allowing site clearing to begin in November, and ground was broken for the $14.4 million station in January 2012.

After demolition work over the next several months, the new parking lot was graded in June 2012 and a temporary platform was constructed west of the old one. Construction of the 204-foot-long platforms took place in the third quarter of 2012, while the pedestrian bridge was lifted into place in March 2013. The station was delayed by the unexpected discoveries of a buried concrete mass and utilities under the new station site. The new station was formally opened on March 25, 2014. Full bidirectional service to Westbrook began with the schedule change of May 11, 2014.
