= Clinton station (Connecticut) =

Railway station in Clinton, Connecticut, US

Clinton
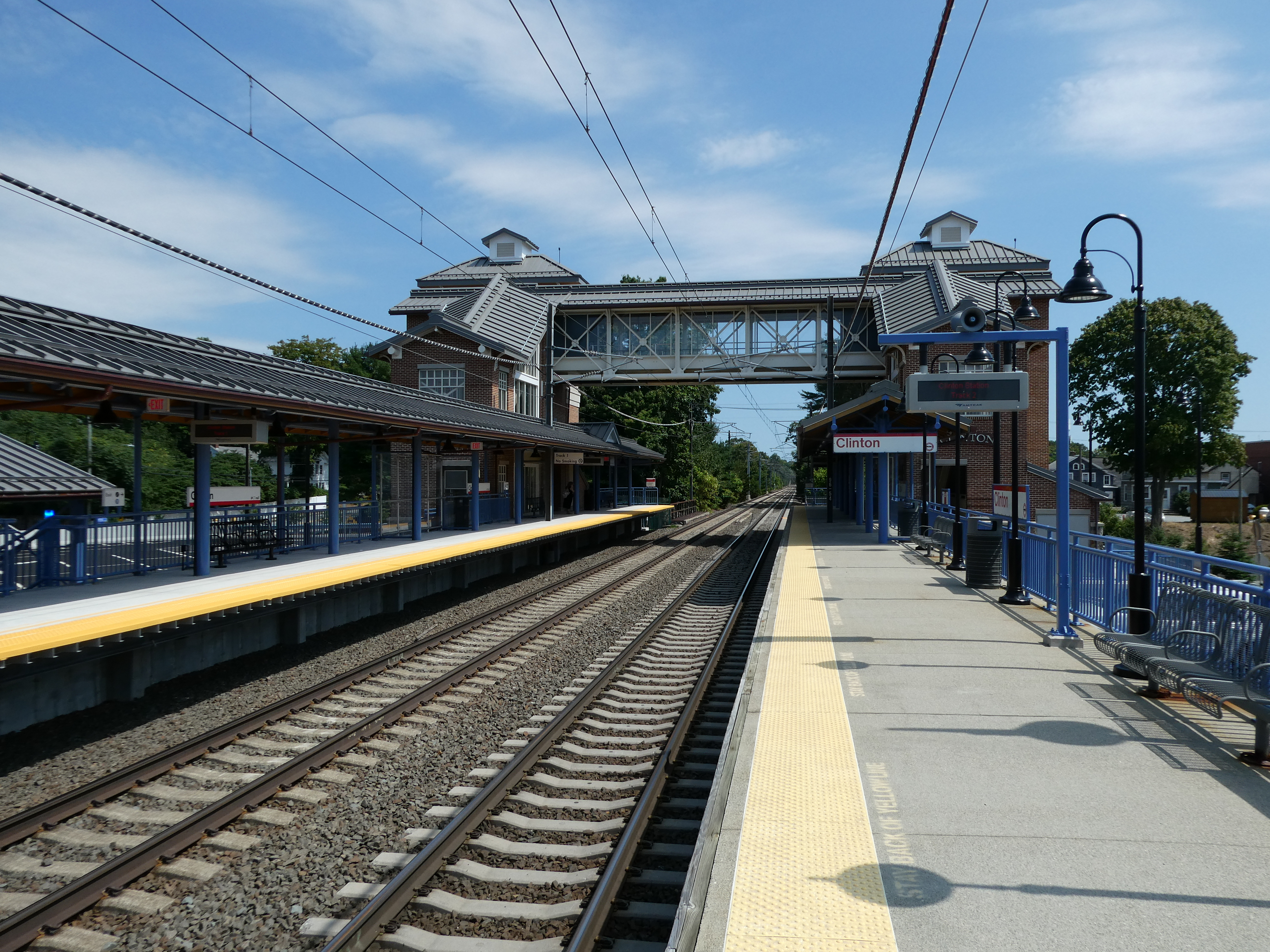
- Clinton station in August 2022

General information
- Location: 10 John Street Extension; Clinton, Connecticut
- Coordinates: 41.2794°N 72.5283°W
- Owner: ConnDOT
- Line: Amtrak Northeast Corridor
- Platforms: 2 side platforms
- Tracks: 2
- Connections: Estuary Transit District: 641

Construction
- Parking: 120 spaces
- Accessible: Yes

Other information
- Station code: Amtrak: CLN

History
- Opened: July 1852–January 28, 1972; January 8–April 30, 1978; May 29, 1990
- Rebuilt: November 19, 1897; 1959; July 25, 2005; May 2019–April 4, 2022

Passengers
- 2019: 43 daily boardings

Services
Preceding station	CT Rail	Following station
Madison toward New Haven Union Station or Stamford	Shore Line East	Westbrook toward New London
Former services
Preceding station	Amtrak	Following station
Madison toward New Haven	Clamdigger	Old Saybrook toward New London
Preceding station	New York, New Haven and Hartford Railroad	Following station
Madison toward New Haven	Shore Line	Westbrook toward Boston
Location

Clinton station is a regional rail station served by the CT Rail Shore Line East service located near downtown Clinton, Connecticut. The station has two side platforms connected by a footbridge. Clinton is a commuter-only station; Amtrak's Acela and Northeast Regional services run through the station without stopping.

== History ==
=== New Haven Railroad ===
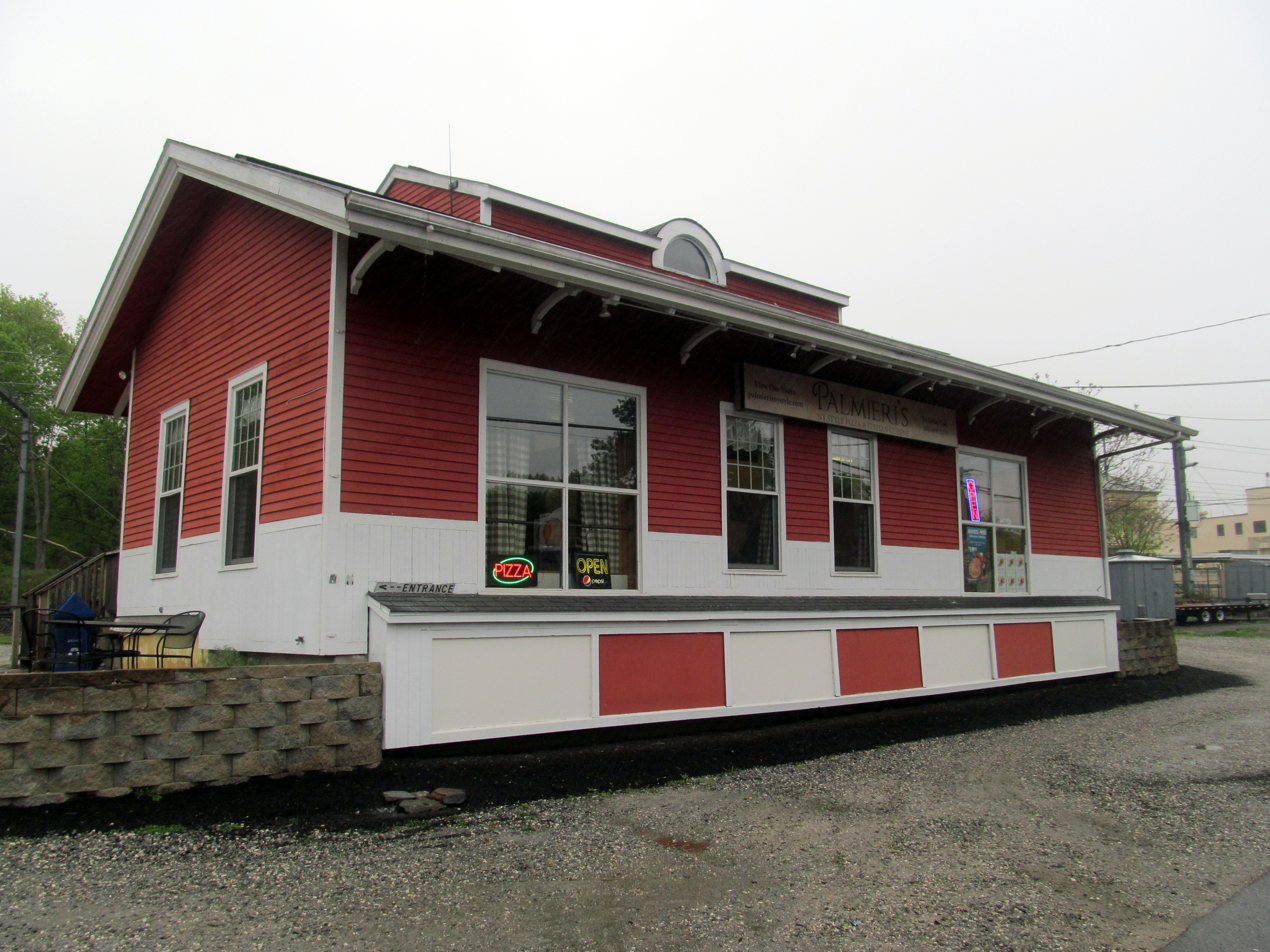
The original 1852 depot is now a restaurant

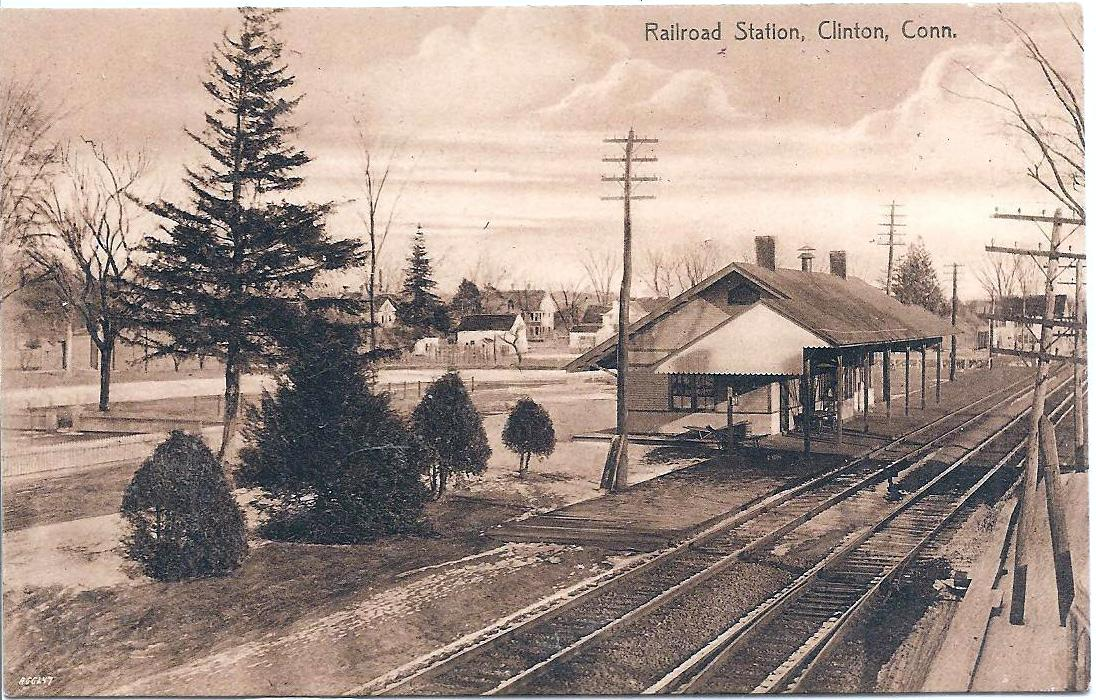
An early postcard of the 1897 station

The New Haven & New London Railroad was chartered in 1848, began construction in 1850, and opened for service in July 1852. A combination depot (serving both freight and passengers) similar to others on the line was located on the south side of the tracks east of John Street in downtown Westbrook. The line was owned by the New York, Providence and Boston Railroad (the "Stonington Road") from 1858 to 1862, and by the Shore Line Railway from 1864 until it was acquired by the New Haven Railroad in 1870.

In the 1890s, the New Haven double-tracked and straightened several sections of the Shore Line. The sharp curve in downtown Clinton was eliminated in 1897, allowing four grade crossings to be eliminated. A new station, located on the north side of the tracks at John Street, was built in the saltbox style and became "the new standard pattern of stations on the Shore Line". The 23-foot (7.0 m) by 80-foot (24 m) station opened on November 19, 1897. Twelve days before, the older station had been moved 700 feet (210 m) to the west for use as a freight house, a function it served until the 1950s. It is still extant and in use as a restaurant.

The 1897-built station was demolished around 1960 when the site was sold to expand parking for the adjacent Chesebrough-Pond's factory. As part of the sale, Chesebrough-Pond's paid for a small shelter to be built slightly to the east at Hull Street. Most commuter service east of New Haven ceased on January 1, 1969, after the New Haven merged into Penn Central, though the Clamdigger continued operation under Penn Central and later Amtrak until January 28, 1972. The shelter was demolished in 1973 along with those at Stonington, East Lyme, Madison, and Branford station.

A second version of the Clamdigger operated from September 9, 1976, to October 30, 1977, but it did not stop at Clinton. The Clamdigger was reinstated on January 8, 1978, with commuter-based flag stops added at Groton, Clinton, Madison, Stony Creek, and Branford. It was replaced by the Boston-New Haven Beacon Hill effective April 30, 1978, ending service to Clinton a second time.

=== Shore Line East station ===
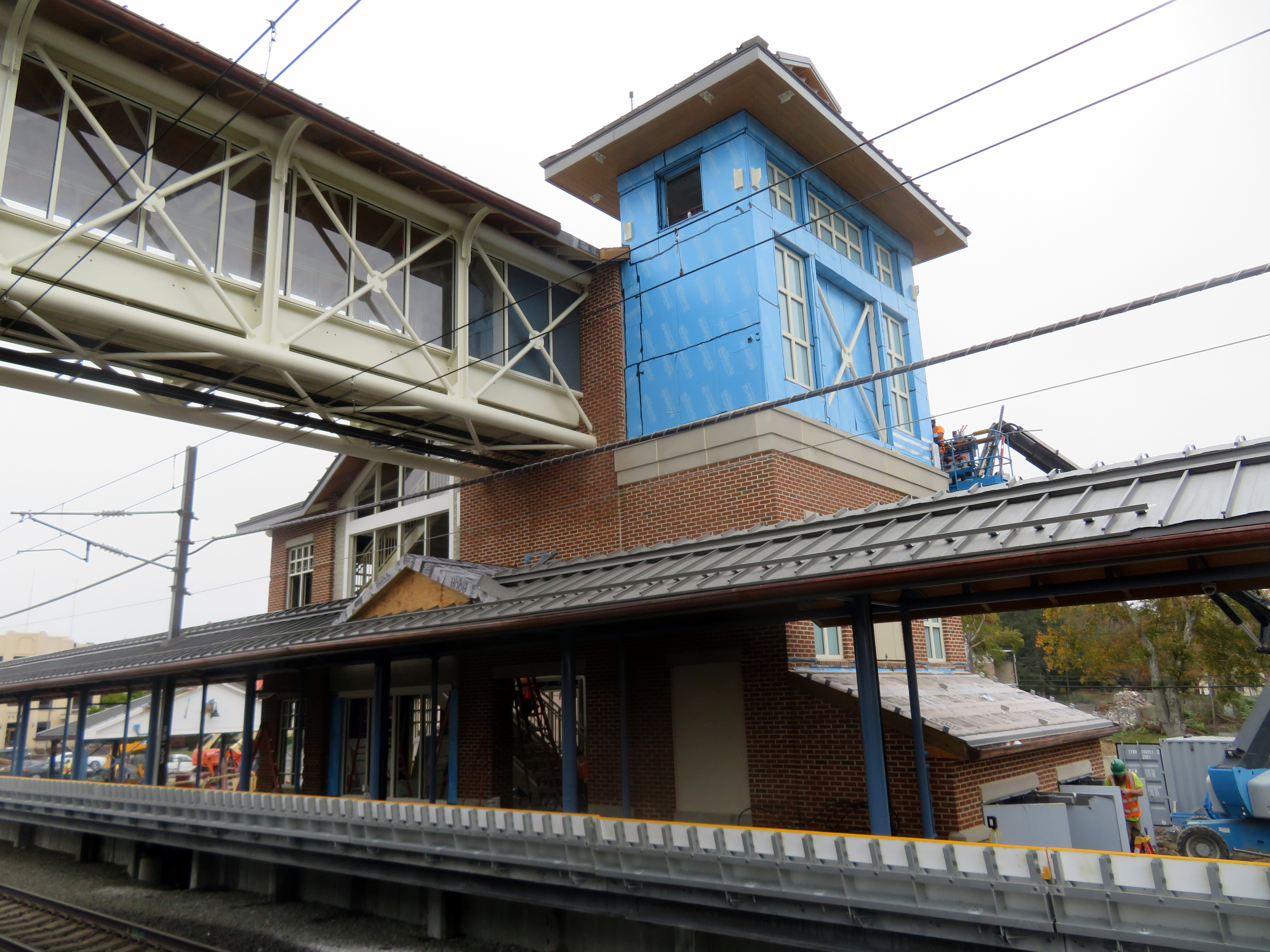
The second platform under construction in 2020

The modern Clinton station opened at the beginning of Shore Line East service on May 29, 1990. A small low-level platform with Plexiglas shelters was located at John Street, almost exactly where the town's first station was located. Like the other original 1990 Shore Line East stations, the station was built before the Americans with Disabilities Act was signed, and its low-level platform was not accessible.

On May 24, 2004, construction of a new platform began at Clinton as well as Guilford and Branford. The rebuilt Clinton station, with a two car long, 200-foot-long high-level platform on the south side of the tracks, opened on July 25, 2005.

A 2003 agreement between the Connecticut Department of Transportation (which operates Shore Line East) and Amtrak (who owns the tracks) included a requirement that all Shore Line East stations have second platforms added before Shore Line East service could be increased. Having two platforms allows SLE trains to use both tracks, providing greater operational flexibility. Per the agreement with Amtrak, a second platform was to be added to Clinton station. The project was originally planned to start in early 2012, but was indefinitely delayed in 2011. By mid-2012 the project was to be advertised to bidders in June 2013, it was then delayed indefinitely.

In October 2017, the state announced that construction would begin in March 2018 and be completed by December 2019. It was announced in January 2018 that the then-$18 million project would be postponed again until new funding was identified. However, bidding for the project took place in August 2018. Funding was nearly withdrawn in December 2018, but town officials convinced the state to allow the project to proceed. A groundbreaking for the $12.5 million project was held in June 2019, with completion then expected in January 2021. The second platform and footbridge opened on April 4, 2022, doubling the amount of service that stops at the station.
