= Niantic station =

Former train station in Connecticut, United States

East Lyme and Niantic
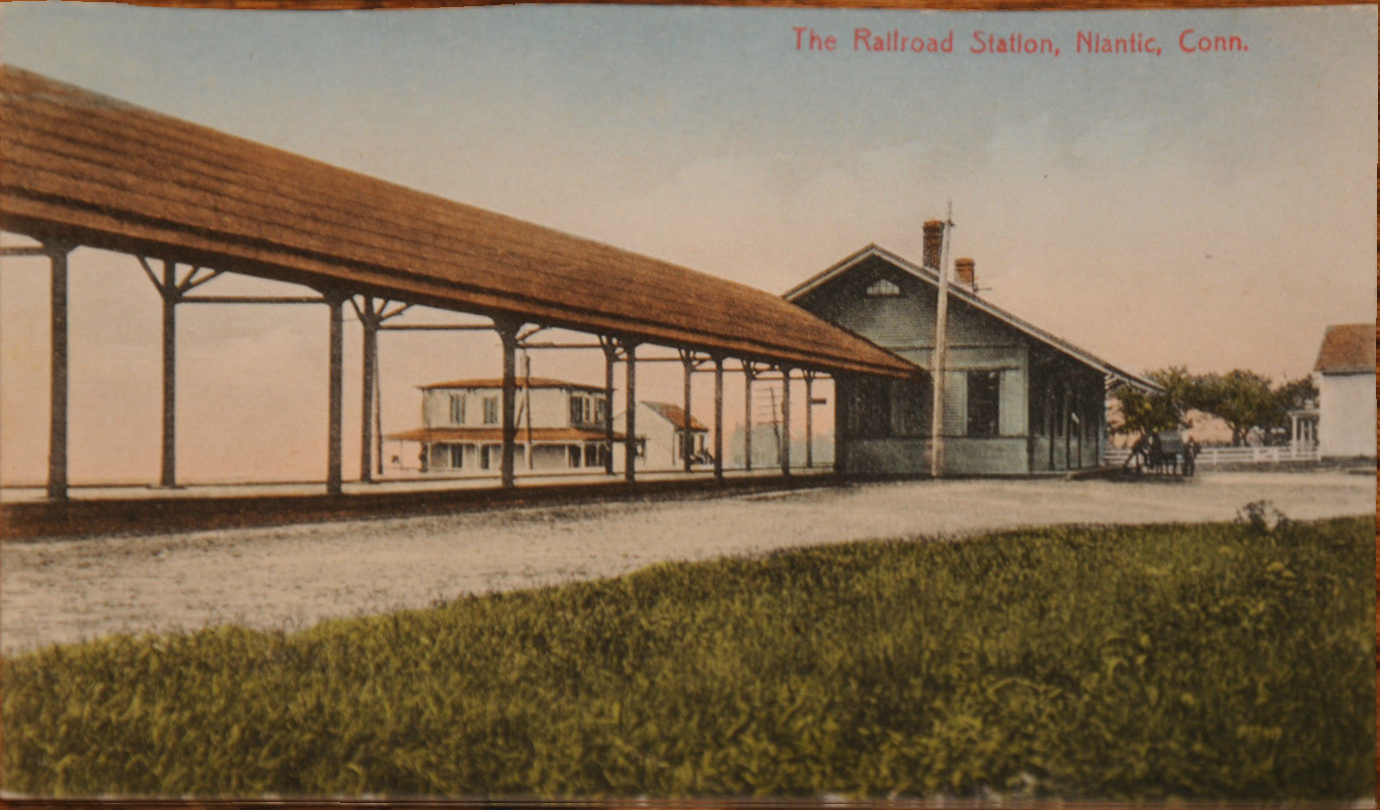
- Niantic station on an early-20th-century postcard

General information
- Location: Main Street at Pennsylvania Avenue; Niantic, Connecticut
- Coordinates: 41.3231°N 72.1920°W
- Line: Northeast Corridor
- Tracks: 2

History
- Opened: 1850s; April 30, 1978
- Closed: January 28, 1972; October 1, 1981
- Rebuilt: 1899, 1954
- Former names: East Lyme; East Lyme and Niantic

Proposed services
Preceding station	CT Rail	Following station
Old Saybrook toward New Haven Union Station	Shore Line East	New London Terminus

Former services
Preceding station	Amtrak	Following station
Old Saybrook toward New Haven	Beacon Hill	New London toward Boston South
Old Saybrook toward New Haven	Clamdigger	New London Terminus
Location

Niantic (also known as East Lyme or East Lyme and Niantic) was a train station on the Northeast Corridor located in the Niantic village of East Lyme, Connecticut. Opened in the 1850s, it was rebuilt in 1899 and again in 1954 by the New Haven Railroad. It closed in 1972, then reopened from 1978 to 1981 for use by the Amtrak Beacon Hill. A new station has since been proposed to be built in Niantic to serve the Shore Line East commuter rail service.

== History ==
=== Former stations ===
The New Haven & New London Railroad was charted in 1848, began construction in 1850, and opened for service in July 1852. East Lyme station, located at the foot of Pennsylvania Avenue, may have opened slightly later than other stations on the line. The line was owned by the New York, Providence and Boston Railroad (the "Stonington Road") from 1858 to 1862, and by the Shore Line Railway from 1864 until it was acquired by the New Haven Railroad in 1870. As Niantic grew to exceed East Lyme proper in population - particularly after Camp Niantic opened in 1873 - the station was renamed East Lyme and Niantic.

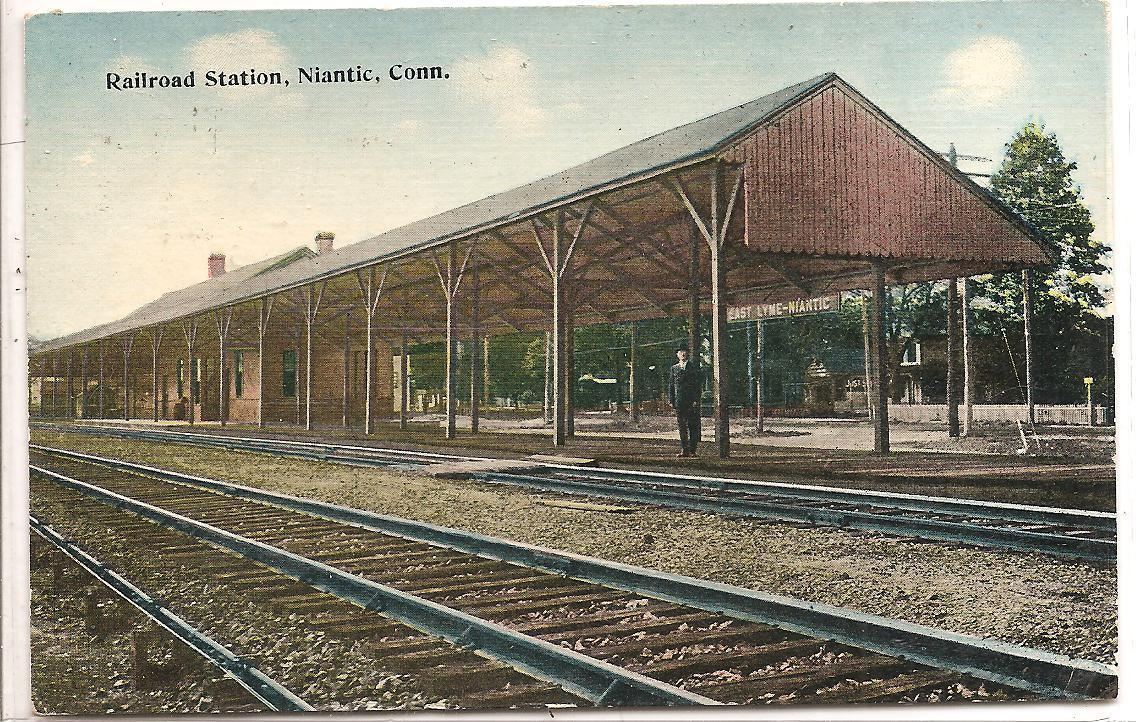
The 1899-built station shown on a postcard mailed in 1915

The original station burned on September 23, 1898. It was replaced in early 1899 by a saltbox style station similar to others that the New Haven built that decade. The station was heavily used by soldiers traveling to Camp Niantic for maneuvers, as well as by spectators. The station was little-used by mid-century; it was divided into retail stores in 1954, and a 15-foot (4.6 m) by 30-foot (9.1 m) wooden shelter was constructed nearby. The 1899-built station building was destroyed by fire on August 22, 1970, and demolished in early September.

Most commuter service east of New Haven ceased on January 1, 1969, after the New Haven merged into Penn Central, though the Clamdigger continued operation under Penn Central and later Amtrak until January 28, 1972. In 1975, the Connecticut Department of Transportation (CDOT) made plans to restore commuter rail service between New Haven and New London, with a twice-daily Clamdigger making the same stops as the pre-1972 train, including to the former Niantic station (now to be named simply East Lyme); although negotiations with Penn Central were successful, budgetary constraints prevented these plans from coming to fruition.

A second version of the Clamdigger operated from September 9, 1976 to October 30, 1977, but it did not stop at Niantic. The Clamdigger was reinstated on January 8, 1978, with commuter-based flag stops added at Groton, Clinton, Madison, Stony Creek, and Branford - but still not Niantic.

The Clamdigger was replaced by the Boston-New Haven Beacon Hill effective April 30, 1978. The decaying wooden shelter had been torn down by the local Jaycees on February 18 of that year as a civic improvement project, so the Niantic 'station' consisted of "a strip of gravel dumped between two yellow two-by-fours". Ridership west of Providence on the Beacon Hill was light; the first passenger to use the Niantic flag stop was a New London Day reporter on the service's third day. The Beacon Hill was discontinued on October 1, 1981, ending service to Niantic a second time.

=== Shore Line East ===
Shore Line East commuter service began between New Haven and Old Saybrook on May 29, 1990. Beginning in 1996, some Shore Line East trips were extended eastward to New London; however, they did not make any stops between Old Saybrook and New London. In April 2012, a state report was released detailing four possible sites for an infill station in East Lyme. Two of the sites were near downtown Niantic (one at the Niantic River Bridge to the east, and the other at Hole in the Wall Beach to the west), while the other two were in Rocky Neck State Park. A 2015 bonding proposal from Connecticut governor Dannel Malloy allocated $750,000 to the planning and construction of a new station and parking lot in Niantic (out of an estimated $30,000,000 required to bring the new station fully into service).
