= Groton station (Connecticut) =

Former passenger rail station

Coordinates: 41.3599°N 72.0707°W

Groton, CT
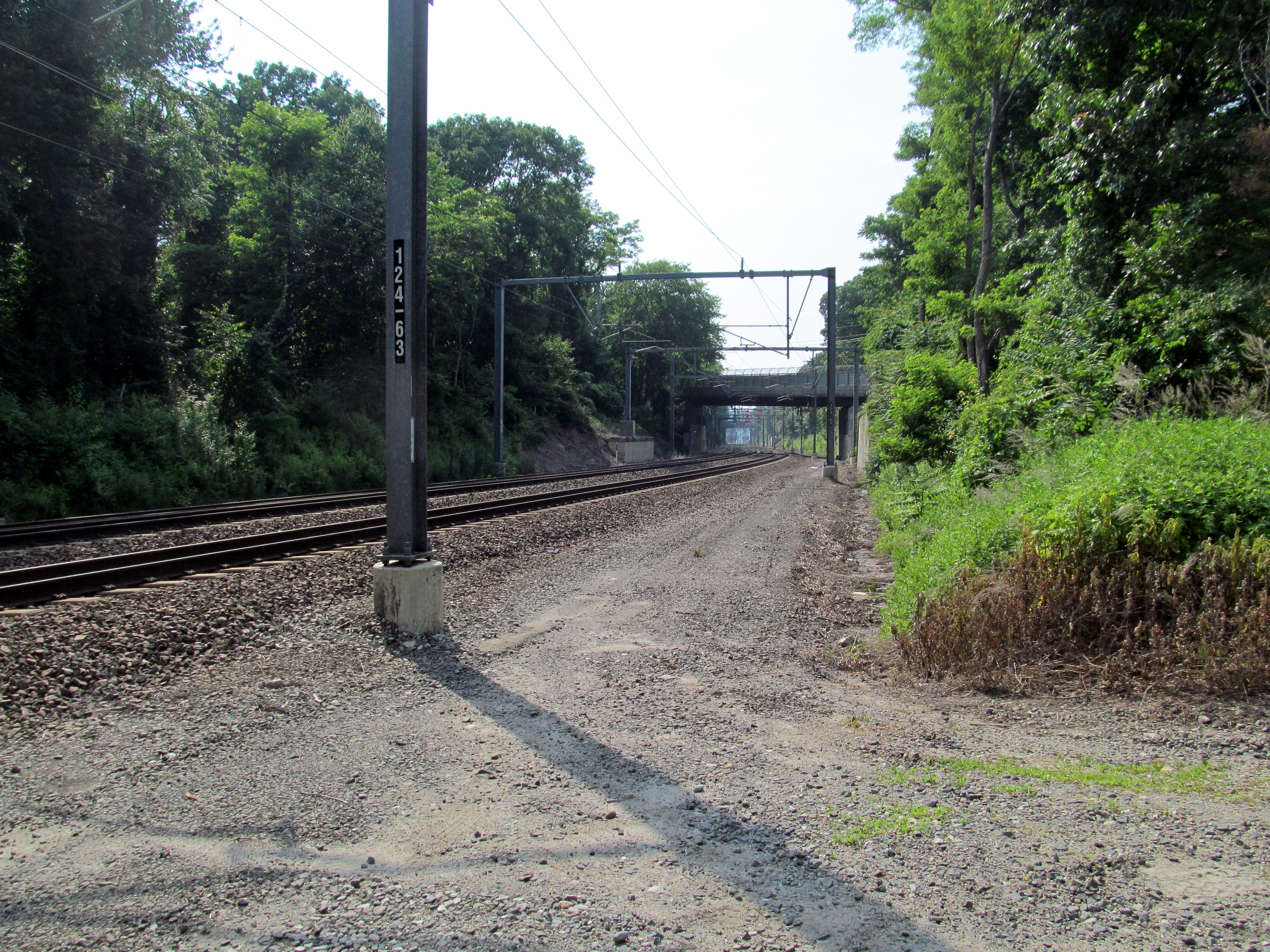
- Former station site photographed in 2013

General information
- Location: Groton, Connecticut
- Lines: Northeast Corridor, Norwich Branch
- Platforms: 1 side platform
- Tracks: 2

History
- Opened: January 8, 1978
- Closed: April 30, 1978

Former services
| Preceding station | Amtrak | Following station |
|---|---|---|
| New London toward New Haven | Clamdigger | Mystic toward Providence |
Location

Groton station was one of the shortest-lived Amtrak passenger rail stations, in service from January to April 1978 during the last incarnation of Amtrak's Clamdigger service. Previous stations at several locations in Groton were served from 1852 until the mid-20th century.

== History ==
In May 1852, the New London & Stonington was chartered to build a railroad from Stonington to Groton, completing the last major section of the "Shore Line" rail link from Boston to New York City. The NL&S failed in early 1857 and was combined with the New Haven and New London Railroad into the New Haven, New London, & Stonington Railroad on March 6, 1857. The extension opened to Groton Wharf on December 30, 1858. Previously, passengers had to board steamships from Stonington to Long Island or New York, but after 1858 only short ferry trips over the Connecticut River and the Thames River were required. In November 1859 the line was leased to the New York, Providence and Boston Railroad; through passenger service began December 12, 1859, with night trains first running August 19, 1861 and sleeping cars November 11.

When the Clamdigger commuter train was revived for the last time on January 8, 1978, Amtrak added commuter-based flag stops at Groton, Clinton, Madison, Stony Creek, and Branford, in addition to the mainline stations it had served since 1976. It was replaced by the Beacon Hill, which did not stop at Groton, on April 30, 1978.

In 2022, the Connecticut Department of Transportation began studying a potential extension of Shore Line East service from New London to Westerly, including a new Groton station.
