= WLY =

WLY or wly may refer to:

- WLY, the Amtrak station code for Westerly station, Rhode Island, United States
- WLY, the National Rail station code for Woodley railway station, Stockport, Greater Manchester, England
- wly, the ISO 639-3 code for Waling language, Nepal and India
