= Clamdigger (train) =

Daily passenger train

The Clamdigger was a daily passenger train which ran along the Northeast Corridor during the 1970s. The train had two iterations: from 1898 to 1972 it was a local commuter service under the New Haven Railroad, Penn Central, and Amtrak between New London and New Haven, while from 1976 to 1978 it was a long-distance commuter service operated by Amtrak from Providence to New Haven. In 1978, it was canceled and replaced with the Beacon Hill.

The Shore Line East service, run by the Connecticut Department of Transportation, currently runs from New London to New Haven, serving many of the same stops as the two incarnations of the Clamdigger.

== Original service (1898–1972) ==
Clamdigger (1898–1972)
Overview
- Service type: Regional rail
- Status: Discontinued
- First service: 1898
- Last service: January 28, 1972
- Successor: Clamdigger (revived service)
- Former operators: NYNH&HRR (1898–1968); Penn Central (1969–1971); Amtrak (1971–1972)
- Ridership: 66 daily (1971)

Route
- Termini: New London; New Haven
- Distance travelled: 50.2 miles (80.8 km)
- Average journey time: 1:15
- Service frequency: Daily
- Train number: 402/403 (Amtrak)
- Line used: Northeast Corridor

Technical
- Rolling stock: Budd RDC

=== New Haven Railroad ===
The New Haven & New London Railroad was charted in 1848, began construction in 1850, and opened for service in July 1852. After several ownership changes, it was acquired by the New York, New Haven, and Hartford Railroad (the "New Haven") in 1870. In 1898, the New Haven introduced a commuter train between New London and New Haven which made most local stops along the Shore Line. The service acquired the Clamdigger name during the Great Depression from riders who collected clams in the clam beds near Stony Creek station.

Clamdigger service as run in 1971

=== Penn Central ===
Penn Central took over operations of the New Haven Railroad effective January 1, 1969. New York-New Haven service was mostly kept, as was Boston-Providence service, but most service between New Haven and Providence was cut. The remaining service was a single Providence-New London round trip (cut to Westerly-Providence on November 22, 1971, and discontinued on June 3, 1977), and a New London-New Haven round trip (the Clamdigger). The Clamdigger, through connections at New Haven, was the only train from New London allowing commuting to New York for regular work hours.

=== Amtrak ===
Amtrak took over most Penn Central operations, including the Clamdigger, effective May 1, 1971. Under Amtrak, the train made intermediate stops between New London and New Haven at Niantic, Old Saybrook, Clinton, Madison, Guilford, Leete's Island, Stony Creek, Pine Orchard, and Branford.

=== Cancellation ===
On October 14, 1971, Amtrak announced their intent to discontinue the Clamdigger, citing ridership of just 66 passengers per train — not enough to fill the single Budd RDC. The Rail Passenger Service Act (RPSA) forbade Amtrak from discontinuing any train which formed part of its "basic system" until mid-1973. Amtrak took the view that the Clamdigger was a commuter train and not part of its basic system. Connecticut disagreed, arguing that all trains on the Shore Line were part of the basic system because they fell within the New York–Boston endpoints. A. Earl Wood, Connecticut's Commissioner of Transportation, filed a lawsuit in the United States District Court for the District of Connecticut to prevent Amtrak from terminating service. Judge Mosher Joseph Blumenfeld ruled in favor of Amtrak the following January, finding that while Wood had standing to sue, Amtrak's reading of the RPSA was accurate. Service ended on January 28, 1972.

After the Clamdigger was discontinued, the Connecticut Department of Transportation (CDOT) studied rail corridors in the state and determined that the Shore Line was the optimum line for restored service. In 1975, plans were made for a twice-daily Clamdigger making the same stops as the former service. The restored service was expected to draw 600 daily riders, but budgetary constraints prevented implementation.

== Amtrak revival (1976–1978) ==
Clamdigger (1976–1978)
Overview
- Predecessor: Clamdigger (previous service)
- First service: September 9, 1976
- Last service: April 30, 1978
- Successor: Beacon Hill (1978–1981); Shore Line East (1990–present)
- Former operator: Amtrak

Route
- Termini: Providence; New Haven
- Distance travelled: 112.4 miles (180.9 km)
- Average journey time: 2:10
- Service frequency: Daily
- Train number: 151/152

Clamdigger service as run in 1978

=== 1976–1977 ===
On September 9, 1976, Amtrak began a Providence-New Haven local service with the Clamdigger name. It operated on an approximately 2-hour schedule as #151 southbound Monday through Saturday, and #152 northbound Sunday through Friday. The train made intermediate station stops only at Kingston, Westerly, Mystic, New London, and Old Saybrook, limiting its usefulness for commuters. The service was ended on October 30, 1977, as part of a wide range of Amtrak service cuts and adjustments.

=== 1978 and Beacon Hill ===
The Clamdigger was reinstated on January 8, 1978, with commuter-based flag stops added at Groton, Clinton, Madison, Stony Creek, and Branford. It was replaced by the Boston-New Haven Beacon Hill effective April 30, 1978. The Beacon Hill was not a true replacement for the Clamdigger, though — it ran towards Boston in the morning, serving the Providence and Boston commuting markets rather than New Haven and New York.

=== Shore Line East ===
After the Beacon Hill was canceled in 1981, the Connecticut Department of Transportation began planning for a return of commuter service in southern Connecticut. Shore Line East service began between Old Saybrook and New Haven in May 1990, and was extended to New London in February 1996. Shore Line East serves mostly the same station stops as the original Clamdigger, but thanks to modernized equipment and higher frequency it has been more successful.
