= Madison station (Connecticut) =

Railway station in Madison, Connecticut

Madison
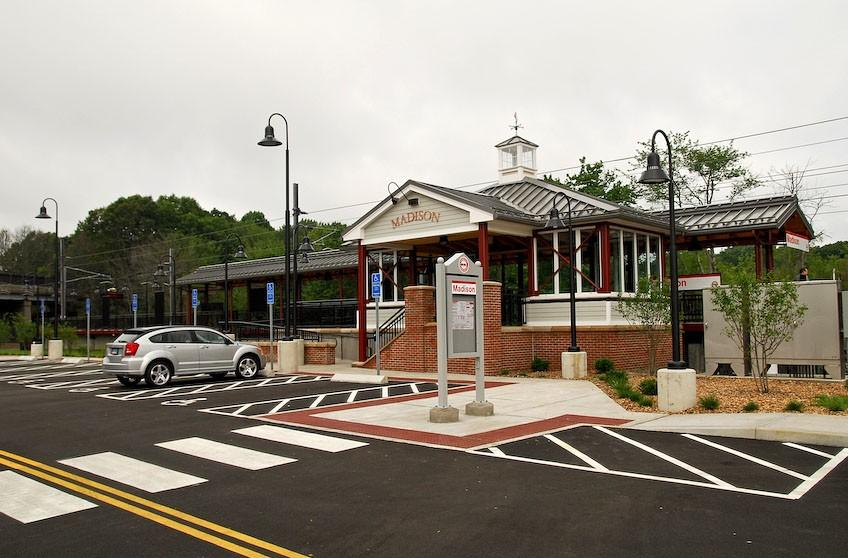
- Madison station in July 2008

General information
- Location: 79 Bradley Road; Madison, Connecticut
- Coordinates: 41.2836°N 72.5995°W
- Owner: ConnDOT
- Line: Amtrak Northeast Corridor
- Platforms: 1 side platform
- Tracks: 2
- Connections: Estuary Transit District: 641; CTtransit New Haven: 201

Construction
- Accessible: Yes

Other information
- Station code: Amtrak: MDS

History
- Opened: 1852 (original station); May 29, 1990 (modern station)
- Closed: October 31, 1978
- Rebuilt: 1896, c. 1950s July 28, 2008; Beginning 2027 (planned)

Passengers
- 2019: 97 daily boardings

Services
Preceding station	CT Rail	Following station
Guilford toward New Haven Union Station or Stamford	Shore Line East	Clinton toward New London
Former services
Preceding station	Amtrak	Following station
Branford toward New Haven	Beacon Hill	Old Saybrook toward Boston South
Stony Creek toward New Haven	Clamdigger	Clinton toward New London
Preceding station	New York, New Haven and Hartford Railroad	Following station
East River toward New Haven	Shore Line	Clinton toward Boston
Location

Madison station is a railroad station on the Northeast Corridor located in Madison, Connecticut, United States. It is served by the CT Rail Shore Line East commuter rail service. The station has a single side platform serving the southern track of the two-track Northeast Corridor. Construction of a second platform is planned to begin in 2027.

== History ==
=== New Haven Railroad ===
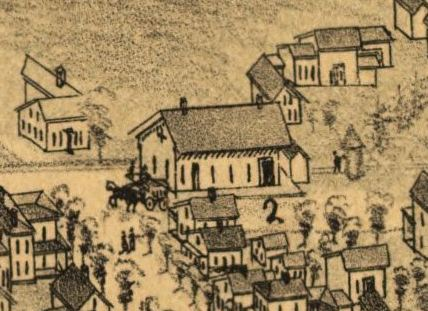
The 1852-built station as depicted on an 1881 map. Note the cross-shaped NYP&B emblem

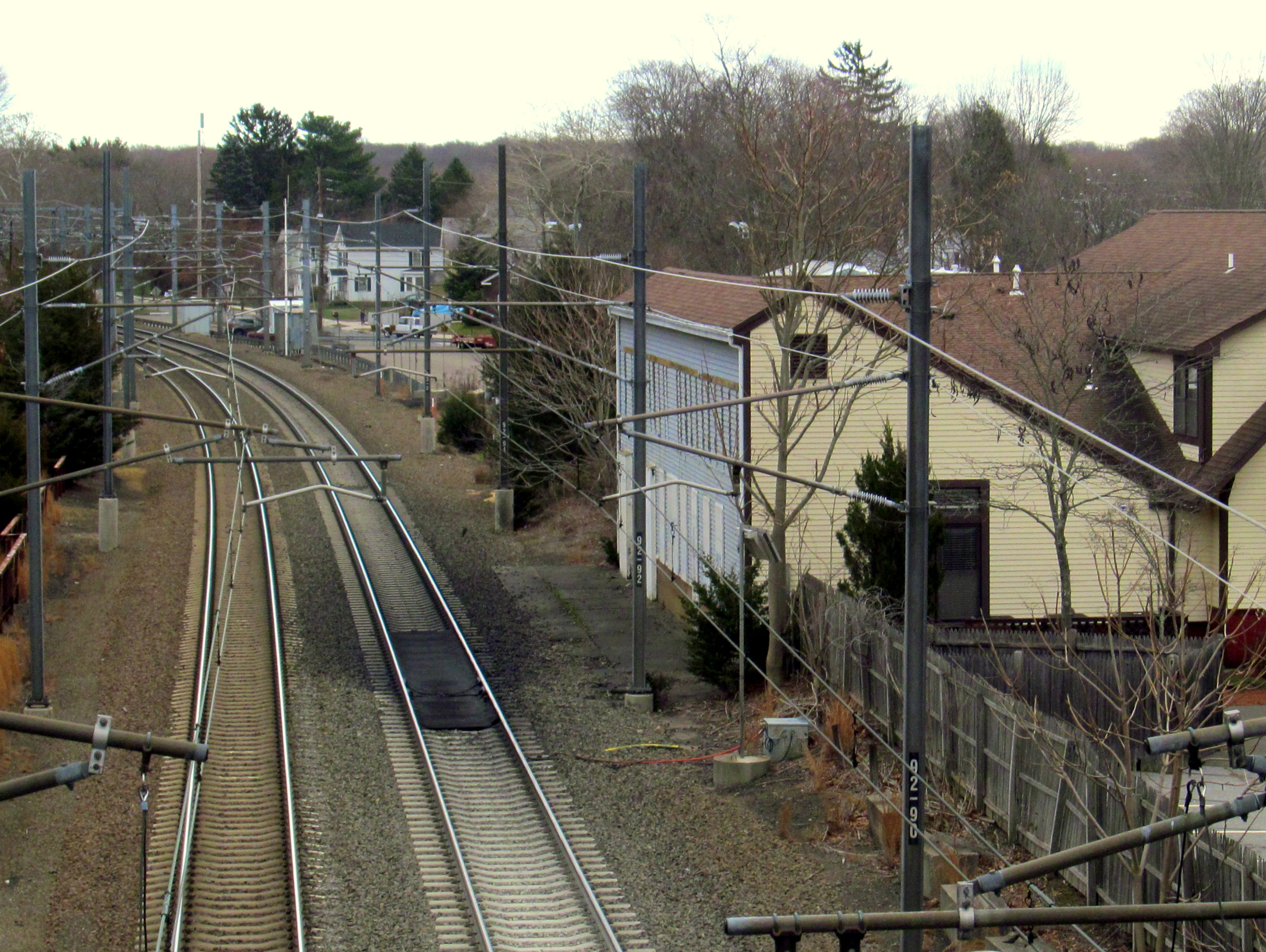
The 1896-built station in 2015

The New Haven & New London Railroad was charted in 1848, began construction in 1850, and opened for service in July 1852. A station similar to other on the line was located off Wall Street just north of downtown Madison. The line was owned by the New York, Providence and Boston Railroad (the "Stonington Road") from 1858 to 1862, and by the Shore Line Railway from 1864 until it was acquired by the New York, New Haven, and Hartford Railroad (the "New Haven") in 1870.

In 1896, the original station was replaced by a saltbox station of a standard New Haven design, located slightly to the west. The older station was moved for use as a freight house. A small wooden westbound shelter, similar to other Shore Line stops east of New Haven, was added in the 1950s.

Most commuter service east of New Haven ceased on January 1, 1969, after the New Haven merged into Penn Central, though the Clamdigger continued operation under Penn Central and later Amtrak until January 28, 1972. The shelter was likely demolished around 1973, as were other such shelters at recently closed stations.

A second version of the Clamdigger operated from September 9, 1976 to October 30, 1977, but it did not stop at Madison. The Clamdigger was reinstated on January 8, 1978, with commuter-based flag stops added at Groton, Clinton, Madison, Stony Creek, and Branford. It was replaced by the Boston-New Haven Beacon Hill effective April 30, 1978. The Beacon Hill was discontinued on October 1, 1981, ending service to Madison a second time.

In 1969, the 1896-built station was renovated as a showroom for a model home company. It is still in place, although the canopy was removed in the late 1990s during electrification work, and an expansion in 2005 modified its shape. In 1985, the 1852-built station was moved for possible renovations, but soon demolished. The Madison Senior Center, which had been a possible reuse of the station, was rebuilt on Old Route 79 as an exact replica; it was demolished around 2011 during the construction of a new ambulance facility on the site.

=== Shore Line East ===
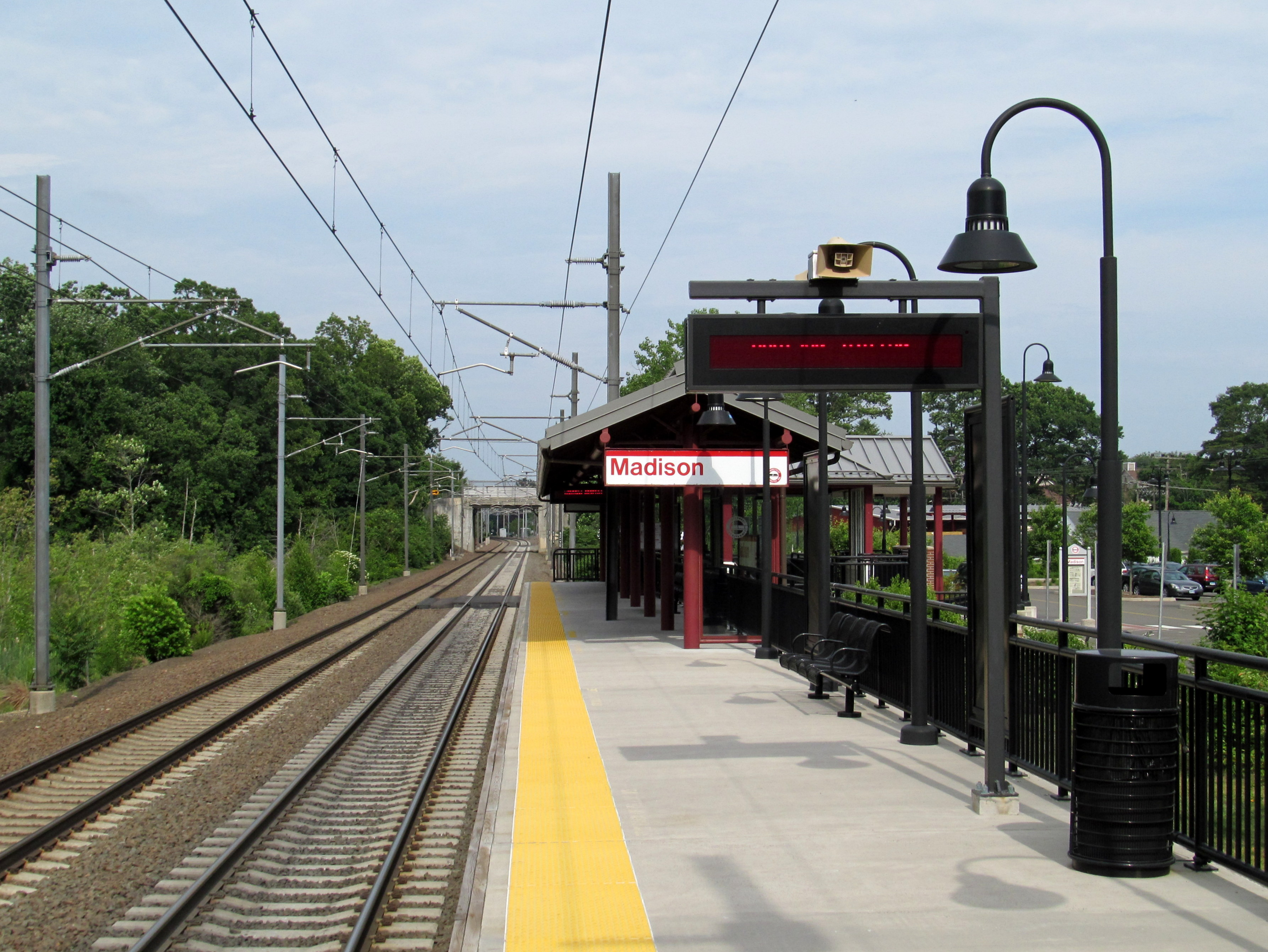
The single platform at Madison in June 2013

The current station has one two-car-long high-level platform. The modern Madison station opened at the beginning of Shore Line East service on May 29, 1990. A small low-level platform with Plexiglas shelters was located at Wall Street, almost exactly where the town's first station was located. Like the other original 1990 Shore Line East stations, the station was built before the Americans with Disabilities Act was signed, and its low-level platform was not accessible. On July 28, 2008, a new station with an accessible high-level side platform and commuter shelter area opened for service 1,300 feet (400 m) to the west of the previous station.

A second platform and three-story parking garage are planned to allow the station, which is less than half a mile from I-95 and US-1, to serve as a park-and-ride station. The second platform is mandated by a 2003 agreement between ConnDOT and Amtrak. A Record of Decision for the project was released in 2009. By 2012 it was to go out to bid in 2013, but this was indefinitely delayed as platform construction at busier Branford and Guilford and electrification work for future M8 service were prioritized instead. After a second attempt, it was announced in January 2018 that the project would be postponed again until new funding was identified. As of January 2026, construction of the $35 million project is planned to begin in fall 2027. Wetlands mitigation will be constructed at two other sites in the town.
