= Mystic station (Connecticut) =

Train station in Mystic, Connecticut

Mystic, CT
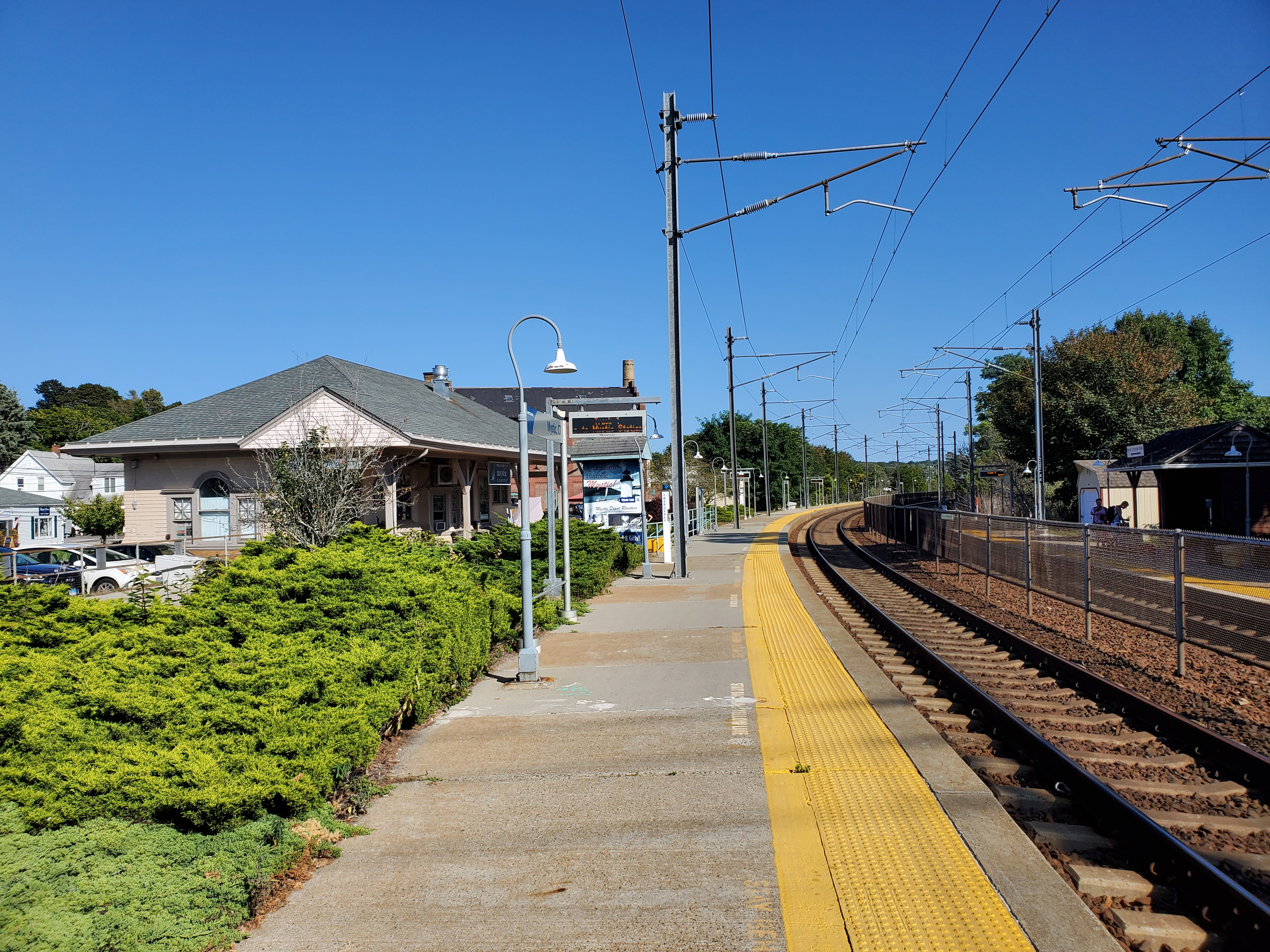
- Facing east at Mystic station in 2024

General information
- Location: 2 Roosevelt Avenue (US 1); Mystic, Connecticut; United States
- Coordinates: 41.3509°N 71.9632°W
- Owner: Amtrak
- Line: Amtrak Northeast Corridor
- Platforms: 2 side platforms
- Tracks: 2
- Connections: SEAT: Stonington HOP

Construction
- Accessible: Yes

Other information
- Station code: Amtrak: MYS

History
- Opened: December 1858
- Rebuilt: 1866, 1905

Passengers
- FY 2025: 48,883 (Amtrak)

Services
Preceding station	Amtrak	Following station
New London toward Norfolk, Newport News or Roanoke	Northeast Regional	Westerly toward Boston South
Acela does not stop here
Former services
Preceding station	Amtrak	Following station
New London toward New Haven	Beacon Hill 1978–1981	Westerly toward Boston South
Groton toward New Haven	Clamdigger 1976–1978	Westerly toward Providence
Preceding station	New York, New Haven and Hartford Railroad	Following station
West Mystic toward New Haven	Shore Line	Stonington toward Boston
Location

Mystic station is an intercity train station on the Northeast Corridor, located off Roosevelt Avenue (US 1) east of downtown Mystic, Connecticut. It is served by a limited number of trains on Amtrak's Northeast Regional service, with three to five daily trains in each direction. Amtrak's Acela also passes by this station, but does not stop. Mystic is one of only three stations on the Northeast Corridor (along with adjacent stations Westerly and Kingston to the north) to be served exclusively by Amtrak, with no commuter rail service.

The first Mystic station opened in 1858; it burned down and was replaced in 1866. The current station building was built in 1905. A classic small American train station, it was used as the model for American Flyer model stations for over 50 years. The station only has low platforms, unlike most Amtrak stations on the Northeast Corridor; however, a wheelchair lift is available for accessibility. The station building is used as a coffee shop and passenger waiting area.

== History ==
=== Early stations ===
The New Haven, New London and Stonington Railroad opened from Stonington to Groton in December 1858 and was shortly thereafter acquired by the New York, Providence and Boston Railroad. A wooden depot, similar to those still extant at West Mystic and Noank, was constructed. The station burned on July 4, 1866, due to Independence Day celebrations; it was soon replaced.

=== Modern station ===
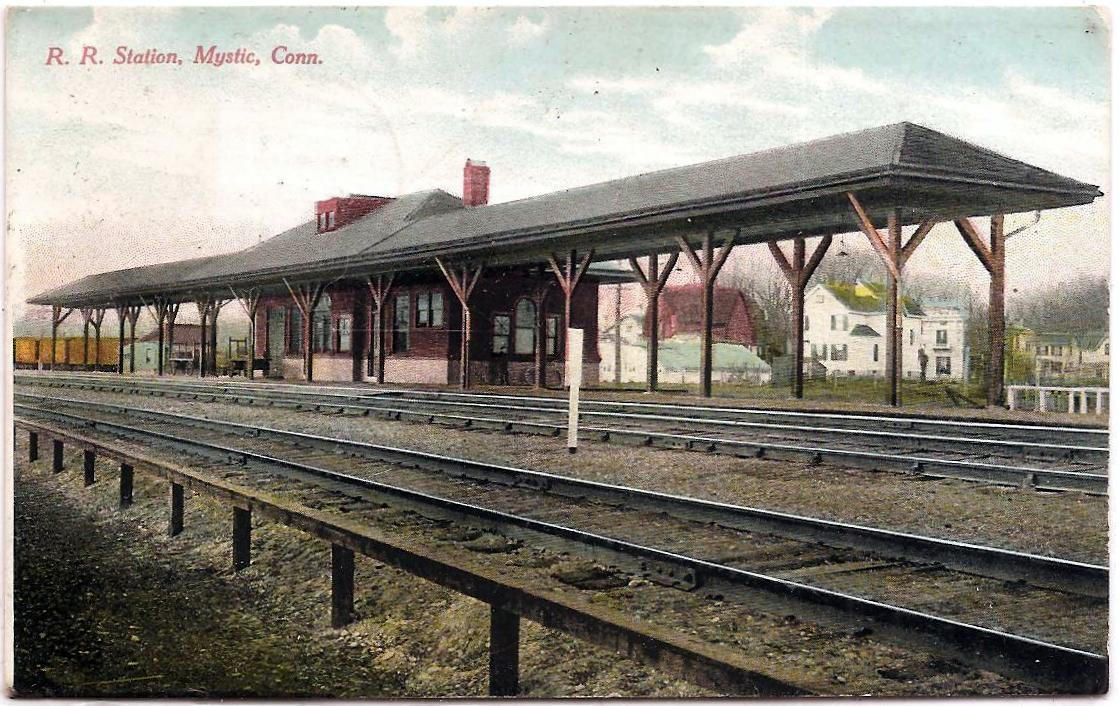
Mystic station on a 1910 postcard

A new station was built in 1905 by the New Haven Railroad. The station is primarily wood on a brown brick base, with Georgian Revival architectural elements such as Palladian windows on the east and west facades. It is clad in wood shingles, which had become popular in New England in the late 19th century as a result of interest in colonial history. Franklin station in Massachusetts was built to a similar design in 1912. The eastern half of the station was a waiting room for passengers, while the western half was a baggage room with few windows. The 1866-built station was repurposed as a freight house.

The station was built with a lengthy gabled canopy which stretched both directions along the platform. The canopy was destroyed in September 1938 by the 1938 New England hurricane; the station was damaged but repaired. The station was used as a model for the American Flyer toy train station beginning in the mid-20th century and lasting over 50 years.

The New Haven Railroad folded into Penn Central in 1969, and passenger operations transferred to Amtrak on May 1, 1971. The station was in poor shape and closed to passengers; although ownership was uncertain, the property was claimed by Amtrak. It was resumed as a station stop in 1974, but no passenger facilities were available.

=== Restoration ===
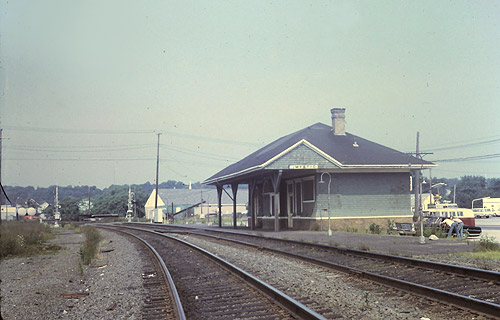
Mystic station in August 1972. At that time the station was closed to passengers, though Amtrak claimed ownership.

In 1976, a group of local residents formed Mystic Depot, Inc. to renovate and reopen the building. They received $40,000 from Amtrak, $15,000 from the state, and raised $36,000 from donations and memorabilia sales. Work began in late 1977 and the station was finished in April 1978. The Mystic Garden Club landscaped the station grounds. The station was restored to a typical mustard and maroon paint scheme. Amtrak leased the station to Mystic Depot, Inc. for $1.00 annually. The rails were moved slightly away from the station building in 1981 when the Mystic River bridge to the west was rebuilt on a new alignment. A wooden shelter was built around 1986 for eastbound passengers.

In 2001, the Greater Mystic Chamber of Commerce began operating a tourist center in the station. The waiting room and a ticket machine were available to passengers, and the station was staffed by volunteers. After the Chamber's lease expired, the station building was closed on March 15, 2015, though Amtrak service continued. Three proposals were submitted for reuse; a Rhode Island–based company won the lease in June 2015 to use the building as a cafe and gift shop. The new lessees began renovating the exterior in late 2015; the Mystic Planning and Zoning Commission approved the interior plan in December 2015. The shop, Mystic Depot Roasters, has seating and a ticket machine for Amtrak passengers; it opened on September 30, 2016.

Weekday stopping service was scheduled to increase from three northbound and two southbound trains to five northbound and six southbound trains on March 16, 2020. However, on that date Amtrak temporarily reduced Northeast Corridor service due to the COVID-19 pandemic.
