= Beacon Hill (train) =

Amtrak commuter train between Boston and New Haven

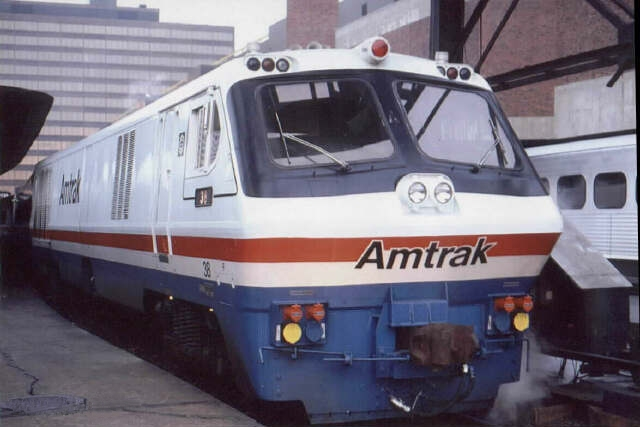
- The Beacon Hill operating with an LRC in 1980

Overview
- Service type: Commuter rail
- Status: Discontinued
- Predecessor: Clamdigger
- First service: April 30, 1978
- Last service: October 1, 1981
- Successor: Providence/Stoughton Line, Shore Line East
- Former operator(s): Amtrak

Route
- Termini: Boston; New Haven
- Stops: 12
- Distance travelled: 157 miles (253 km)
- Average journey time: 3 hours
- Service frequency: Daily (weekdays only)
- Train number(s): 153, 154

The Beacon Hill was a daily 157-mile (253 km) commuter rail service operated by Amtrak between Boston, Massachusetts, and New Haven, Connecticut, from 1978 to 1981. The Beacon Hill was one of the last long-haul commuter services operated by Amtrak. Service consisted of a single rush-hour round trip, with service eastbound to Boston in the morning and westbound to New Haven in the evening.

== History ==
=== Previous service ===
By the time the New Haven Railroad folded into Penn Central in 1969, commuter service between New Haven and Providence had been reduced to a handful of daily trips. (Commuter service west of New Haven continued under Penn Central and Conrail then Metro-North Railroad, while Boston-Providence service was taken over by the MBTA in 1975). The Clamdigger operated as a daily local from New London to New Haven under Amtrak until January 28, 1972. It returned as a Providence-New Haven local on September 9, 1976; it was discontinued on October 30, 1977, but resumed on January 8, 1978 with additional stops.

A single Penn Central commuter local between New London and Providence (not taken over by Amtrak in May 1971) was cut to Westerly-Providence on November 22, 1971. The service was discontinued on June 3, 1977.

=== Beacon Hill ===
Geographic map of Beacon Hill service

On April 30, 1978, the Clamdigger was replaced with the Beacon Hill, which ran in the reverse direction to serve the Boston commuter market rather than the New Haven and New York markets. This left the Beacon Hill as the only commuter service between New Haven and Providence. The Beacon Hill supplemented Amtrak's existing intercity trains on the Corridor, which made fewer stops.

The Beacon Hill initially made station stops at New Haven Union Station, Branford, Madison, Old Saybrook, Niantic, New London Union Station, Mystic, Westerly, Shannock, Kingston, Wickford Junction, East Greenwich, Providence, Route 128, Boston Back Bay, and Boston South Station. Running time was slightly over 3 hours, with service on weekdays plus Sundays. The southbound weekday trip departed South Station in Boston at 5:00pm. Ridership was initially heavy between Boston and Providence, but low on the remainder of the run.

On April 29, 1979, the southbound Beacon Hill was cancelled north of Providence due to track work; passengers had to take the Evening Liberty Express from Boston and transfer to the Beacon Hill at Providence. Normal southbound service returned on July 29, 1979.

The Beacon Hill was cancelled on October 26, 1979. On November 3, 1979, the Southwest Corridor was closed for reconstruction. All MBTA Commuter Rail and Amtrak service was routed via the Midland Branch instead. The Midland does not pass through Back Bay station; a shuttle train from South Station to Back Bay was available.

The Beacon Hill was restored on February 3, 1980; however, the southbound departure time was moved to 4:20pm and the train became weekdays-only. This prevented workers on a 9-to-5 schedule — a major segment of the commuter market — from using the train. Beginning on September 29, 1980, the Beacon Hill frequently ran with one of Amtrak's two LRC test trainsets. Before then, it often ran with a pair of Budd Rail Diesel Cars.

=== Cancellation and modern service ===
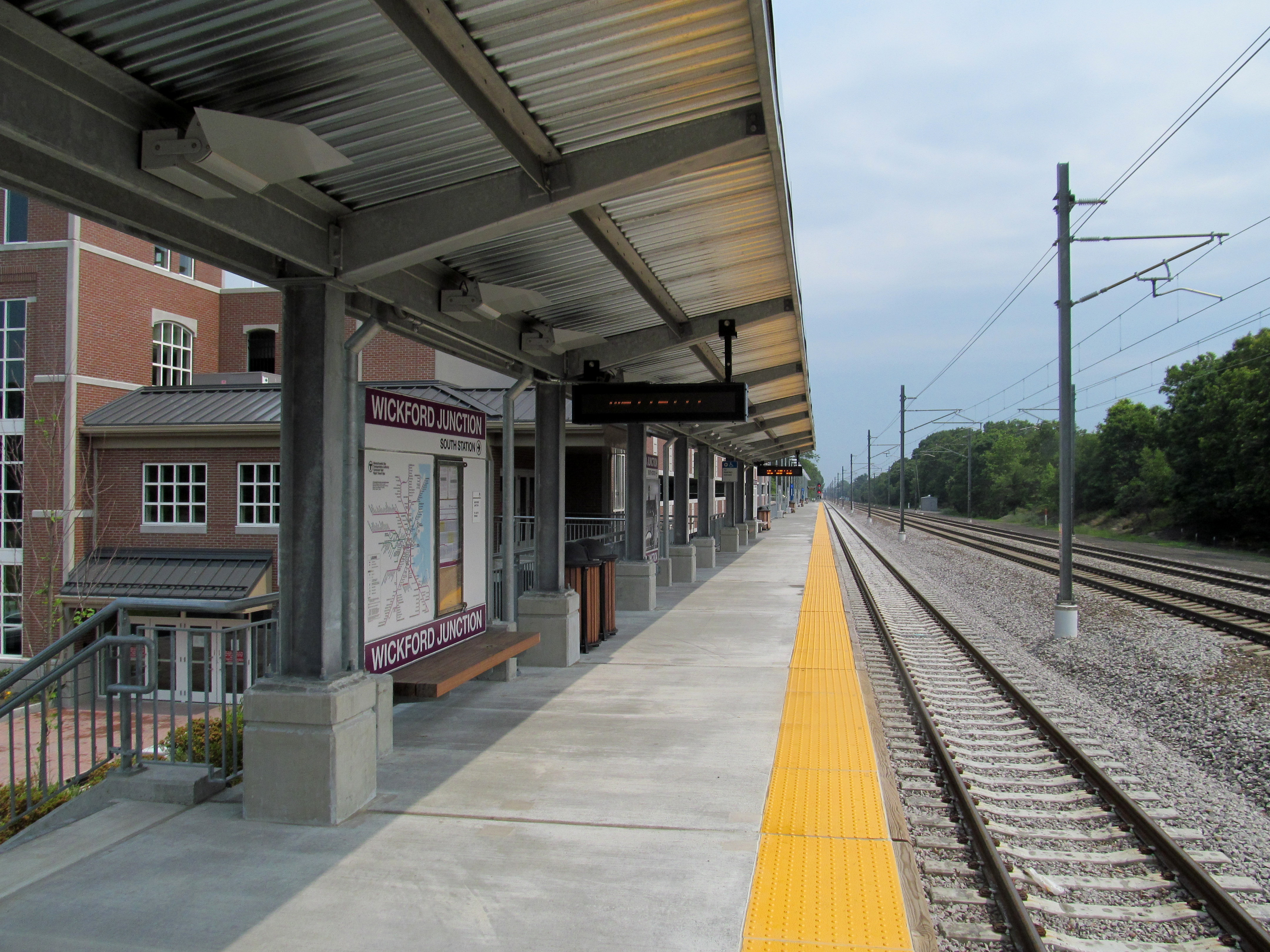
This MBTA station at Wickford Junction was opened in 2012 across the tracks from the former Beacon Hill station

The Beacon Hill was discontinued effective October 1, 1981, victim of Amtrak cost-cutting, the unwillingness of state governments to provide necessary funding, and declining ridership. Regular (now branded as Northeast Regional) service continues and has been supplemented by Acela Express service, but these intercity services stop only at larger towns and cities and are not priced for commuter service.

In 1990, the Connecticut Department of Transportation began Shore Line East service between Old Saybrook and New Haven, with 4 daily trains. The service was extended to New London in 1996.

MBTA service to Providence resumed on February 1, 1988, restoring commuter rail service to Rhode Island. The Pawtucket/Central Falls station remained closed and was replaced in 1990 by South Attleboro station just across the Massachusetts border. After years of planning by RIDOT, the Providence/Stoughton Line was extended south to T.F. Green Airport on December 6, 2010, and to the former Beacon Hill station at Wickford Junction on April 23, 2012.

ConnDOT and RIDOT have long-term plans to extend Shore Line East and MBTA service to meet at Westerly station, which would provide a two-seat ride roughly matching the Beacon Hill. RIDOT also plans to add an infill station at East Greenwich near the former station site.
