= Guilford station =

Railway station in Guilford, Connecticut

Guilford
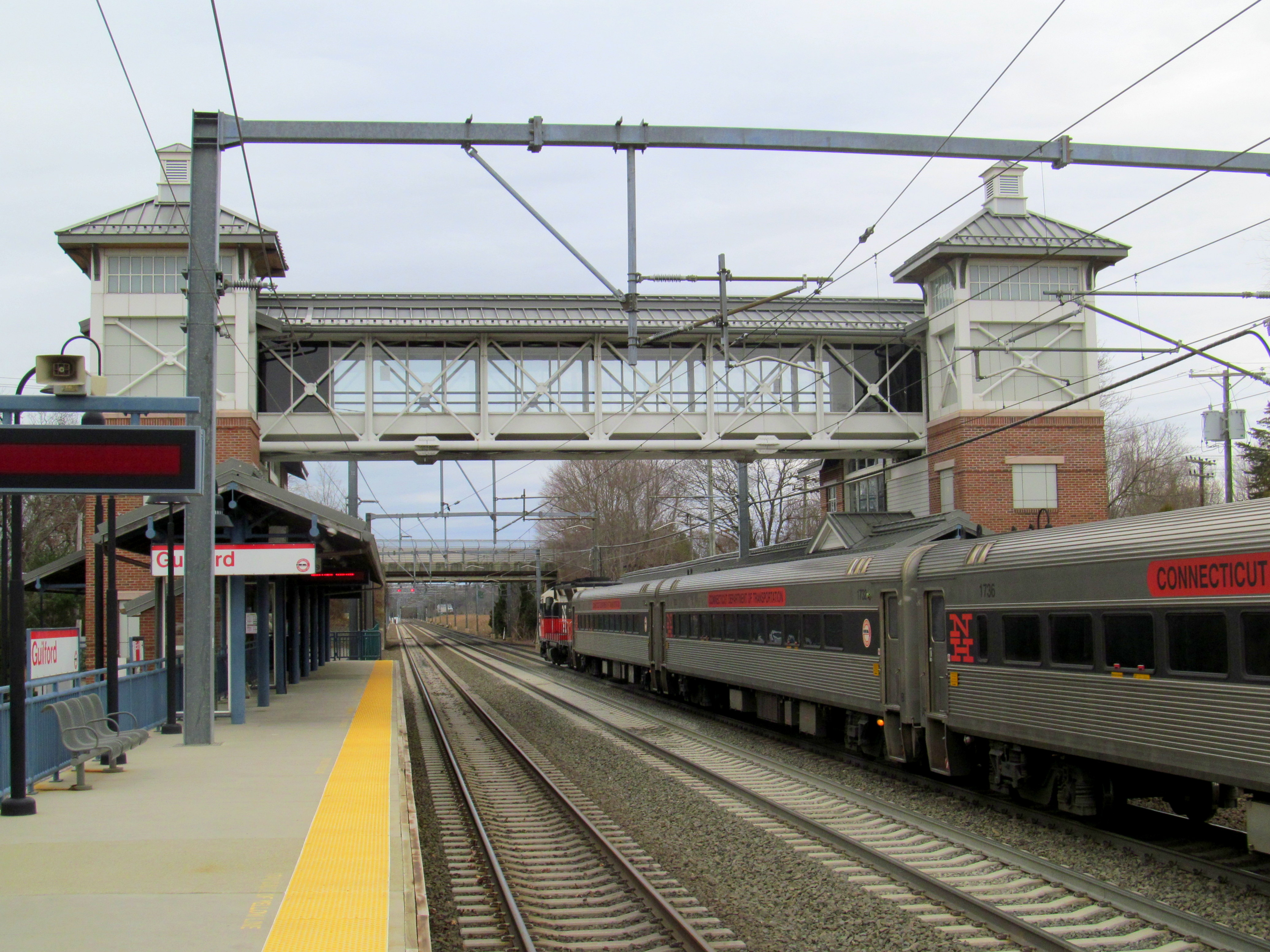
- A westbound Shore Line East train at Guilford in 2015

General information
- Location: 325 Old Whitfield Street; Guilford, Connecticut
- Coordinates: 41.2756°N 72.6736°W
- Owner: ConnDOT
- Line: Amtrak Northeast Corridor
- Platforms: 2 side platforms
- Tracks: 3

Construction
- Accessible: Yes

Other information
- Station code: Amtrak: GUI

History
- Opened: May 29, 1990
- Rebuilt: November 28, 2005

Passengers
- 2019: 124 daily boardings

Services
Preceding station	CT Rail	Following station
Branford toward New Haven Union Station or Stamford	Shore Line East	Madison toward New London
Former services
Preceding station	Amtrak	Following station
Leete's Island toward New Haven	Clamdigger Discontinued 1972	Madison toward New London
Preceding station	New York, New Haven and Hartford Railroad	Following station
Leete's Island toward New Haven	Shore Line	East River toward Boston
Location

Guilford station is a regional rail station on the Northeast Corridor, located slightly south of the town center of Guilford, Connecticut. Owned by the Connecticut Department of Transportation, it is served by the CT Rail Shore Line East service.

== History ==
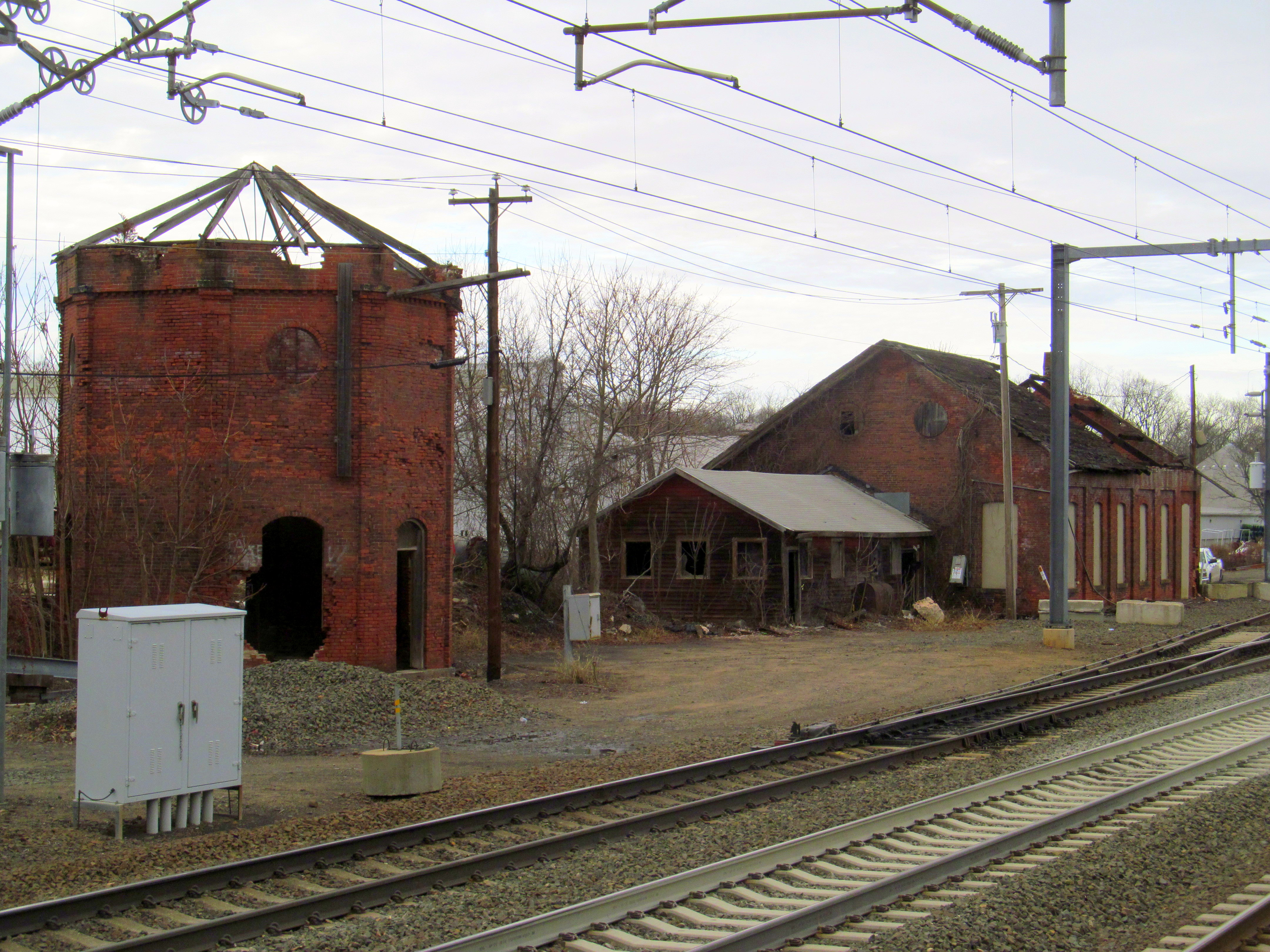
Derelict water tower and engine house at Guilford

Service to Guilford was begun by the New Haven and New London Railroad in 1852. Most local service ended in the mid 20th century; however, Guilford was a stop on the final local train, the Clamdigger, until service was discontinued on January 28, 1972. The station building was demolished by Amtrak on February 23, 2000, due to concerns that the long-abandoned building might collapse. A derelict brick water tower and engine house–rare surviving examples of mid-19th-century railroad buildings–remain at the site.

The current station, with accessible-compliant high-level side platforms, opened on November 28, 2005, replacing the low-level platforms constructed in 1990 for the inauguration of Shore Line East service on May 29, 1990.

Ridership increases have rendered the parking lot at Guilford insufficient. 90 spaces were added on the Track 1 side of the Guilford station.

Guilford Center was not the only part of Guilford with a train station. Leete's Island station, located off Route 146 near the Branford line, served the Penn Central and later Amtrak Clamdigger service until 1972. Sachem's Head station, which was also located off Route 146 closer to Guilford Center, was closed in 1969.

== Station layout ==
Guilford has two high-level side platforms, each two cars long. Before 10:00am, westbound trains use Track 4 and eastbound trains use Track 1. After 10:00 am, westbound trains use Track 1 and eastbound use Track 4. On weekends, this swap occurs around 1:00pm.
