= Estuary Transit District =

Public transit provider for the Lower Connecticut River Valley region

River Valley Transit
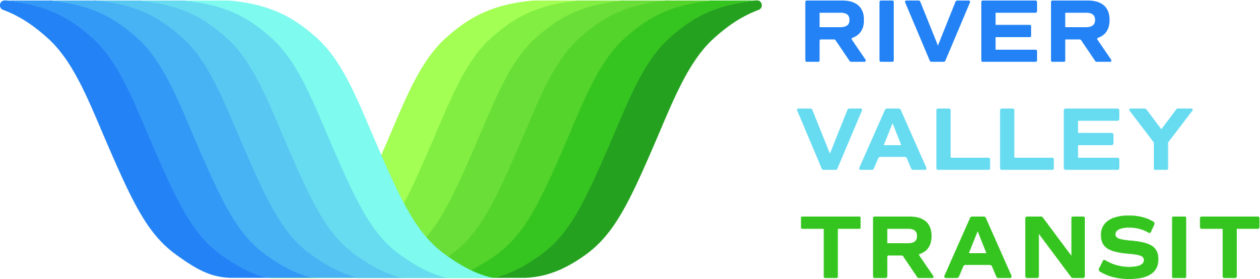

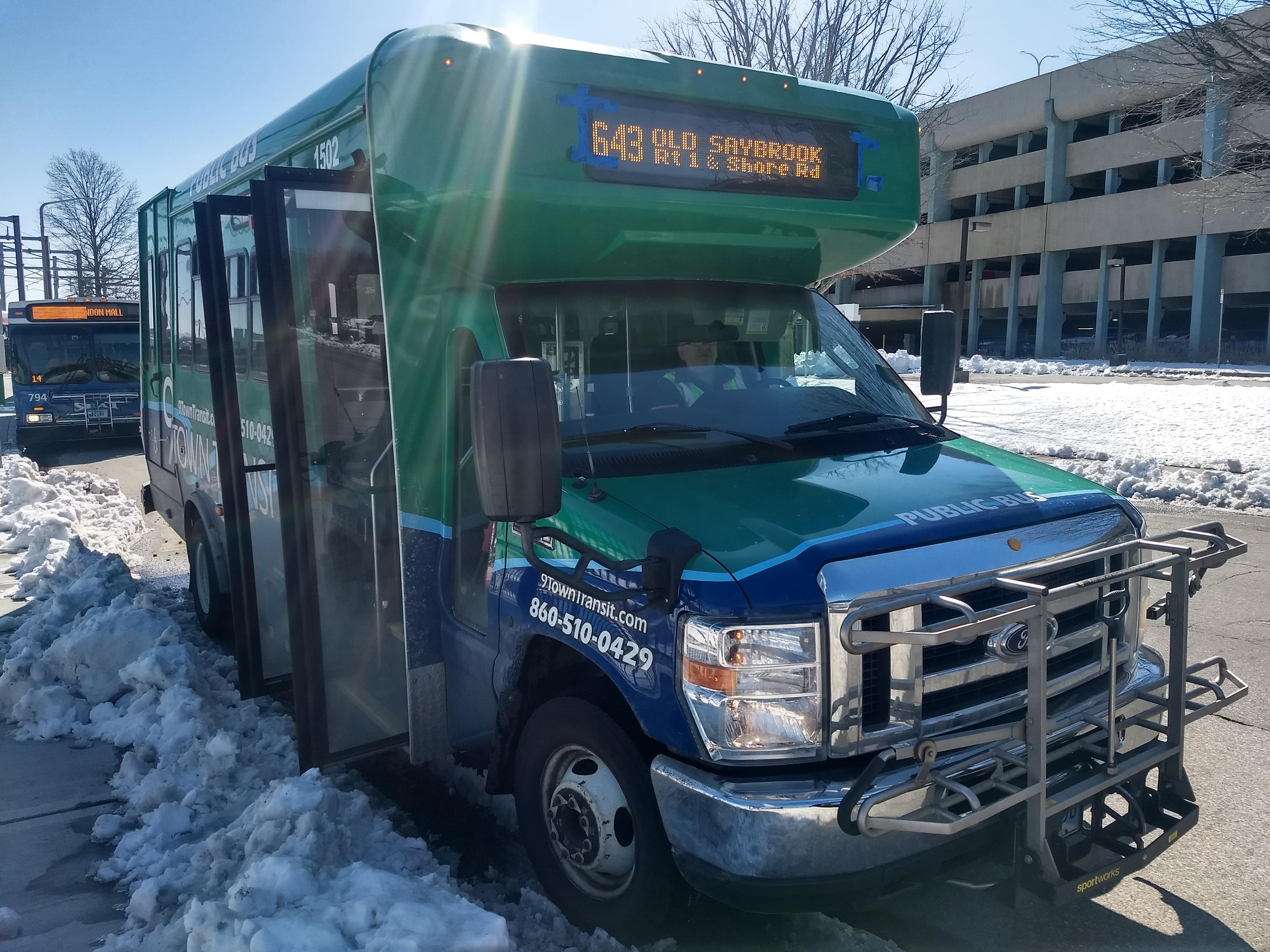
- A River Valley Transit bus in the former 9 Town Transit branding on the 643 route in New London
- Formerly: 9 Town Transit, Middletown Area Transit
- Parent: Estuary Transit District
- Founded: May 1981 (9 Town Transit); July 2022 (merger)
- Headquarters: 91 North Main Street, Middletown, Connecticut
- Service area: Lower Connecticut River Valley
- Service type: Local bus Dial-A-Ride; XtraMile Microtransit; ADA Paratransit
- Routes: 12
- Hubs: Old Saybrook station Middletown Bus Terminal
- Operator: Estuary Transit District, managed by First Transit
- Website: rivervalleytransit.com

Estuary Transit District, doing business as River Valley Transit, is the public transit provider for the Lower Connecticut River Valley region. ETD provides bus service in the municipalities of Chester, Clinton, Durham, Deep River, East Haddam, East Hampton, Essex, Killingworth, Haddam, Lyme, Old Lyme, Old Saybrook, Portland, Westbrook, Middlefield, Middletown, and Madison. It was formed in 2022 by the merger of the Estuary Transit District (dba 9 Town Transit) and Middletown Area Transit.

== History ==
The Estuary Transit District was founded in 1981 and operated 9 Town Transit bus service in the Old Saybrook area. XtraMile microtransit service in the Old Saybrook area began in 2019. Middletown Area Transit merged into the Estuary Transit District on July 1, 2022. XtraMile service was added in Middletown later in 2022. On March 27, 2023, the system was rebranded as River Valley Transit, replacing the old 9 Town Transit and Middletown Area Transit names. In May 2024, two additional microtransit service zones were added.

== Services ==
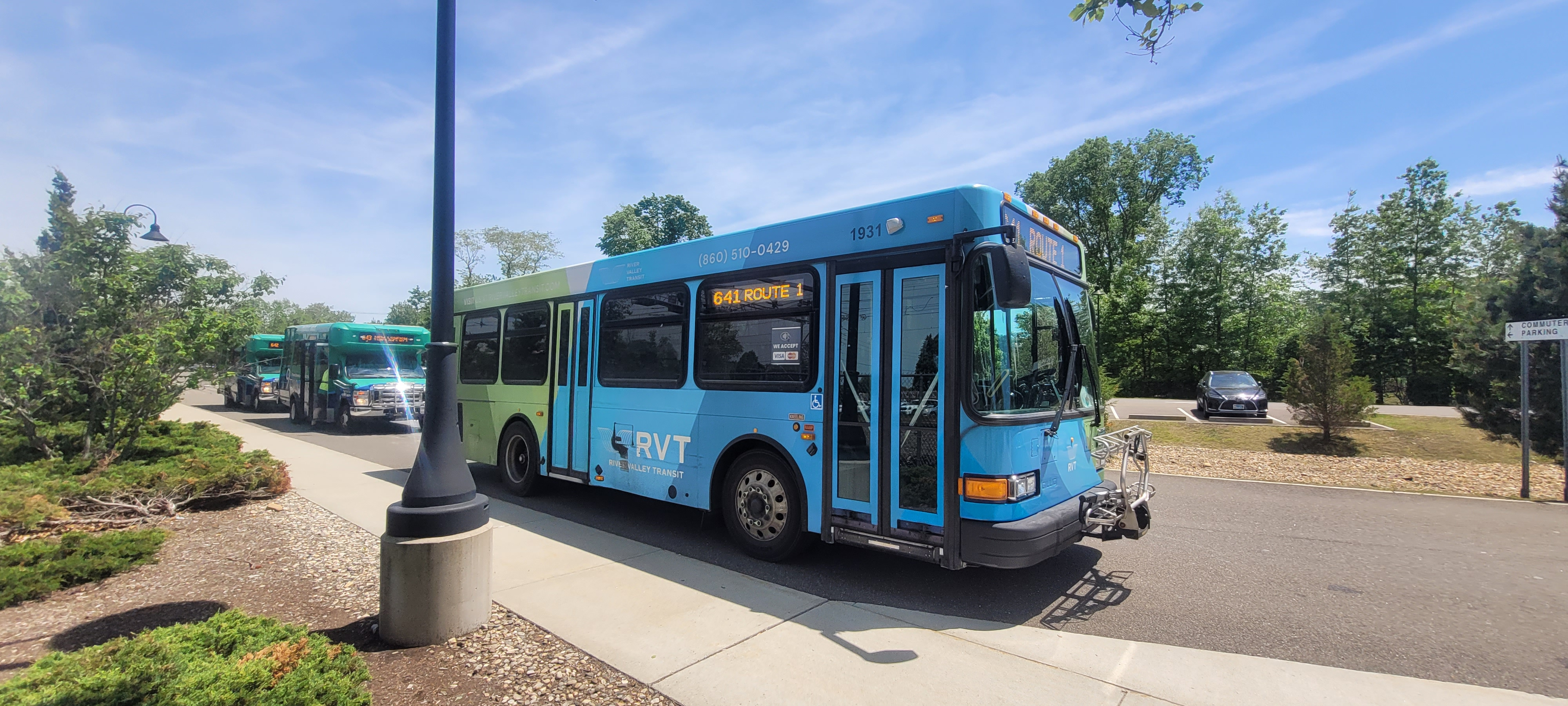
River Valley Transit buses at Old Saybrook station

Fixed-route bus services are divided into two divisions: Shoreline (formerly 9 Town Transit) and Middletown (formerly Middletown Area Transit). The Shoreline division hub is Old Saybrook station; the Middletown hub is the Middletown bus terminal.

- Shoreline
  - 640: Old Saybrook Loop
  - 641: Old Saybrook – Madison
  - 642: Old Saybrook – Chester
  - 643: Old Saybrook – New London
  - 644: Old Saybrook – Middletown
  - 645: Madison – Middletown
- Middletown
  - 581: Saybrook Road
  - 582: Wesleyan Hills
  - 583: Washington Street
  - 584: Newfield Street
  - 585: Westlake Drive
  - 586: Portland/East Hampton
  - 590: Meriden – Middletown Flyer

RVT operates four microtransit services branded as XtraMile. RVT also operates paratransit services in portions of the Shoreline and Middletown divisions, and dial-a-ride services with a higher fare but no age/disability requirement through the whole service area.
