= Westerly station =

Railway station in Westerly, RI

Westerly, RI
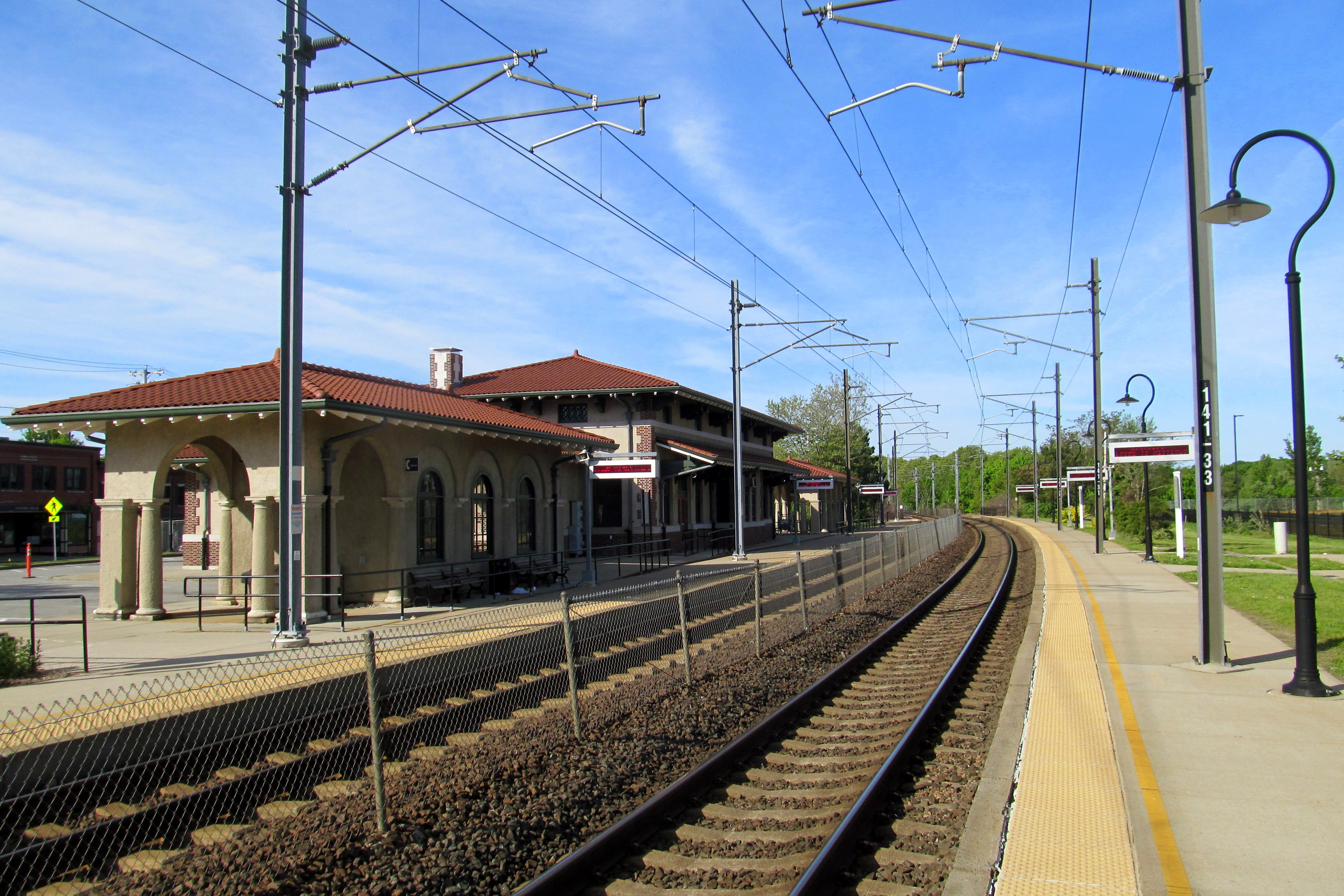
- Westerly station from the southbound platform in 2017

General information
- Location: 14 Railroad Avenue; Westerly, Rhode Island; United States
- Coordinates: 41.3812°N 71.8299°W
- Owner: Amtrak
- Line: Amtrak Northeast Corridor
- Platforms: 2 side platforms
- Tracks: 2
- Connections: RIPTA: 95x, 204, 301

Construction
- Accessible: Yes

Other information
- Station code: Amtrak: WLY

History
- Opened: 1837
- Rebuilt: 1872; 1912-13

Passengers
- FY 2025: 58,289 (Amtrak)

Services
| Preceding station | Amtrak | Following station |
|---|---|---|
| Mystic toward Norfolk, Newport News or Roanoke | Northeast Regional | Kingston toward Boston South |
Acela does not stop here
Former services
| Preceding station | Amtrak | Following station |
|---|---|---|
| Mystic toward New Haven | Beacon Hill | Shannock toward Boston South |
| Preceding station | Penn Central | Following station |
| Terminus | Westerly–Providence local 1971-1979 | Shannock toward Providence |
| Preceding station | New York, New Haven and Hartford Railroad | Following station |
| Stonington toward New Haven | Shore Line | Shannock toward Boston |
Location

Westerly station is a passenger rail station on the Northeast Corridor located just north of downtown Westerly, Rhode Island. It is served exclusively by Amtrak's Northeast Regional service.

Westerly is one of a small number of Amtrak stations (along with Mystic and Aberdeen) on the Northeast Corridor that does not have high-level platforms for accessible boarding. However, Westerly is still handicapped accessible; passengers may use a portable lift to board trains, and the under-track passage includes a wheelchair lift on its staircases. Westerly is also one of three Northeast Corridor stations (along with adjacent Mystic to the south and Kingston to the north) that is served exclusively by Amtrak, with no commuter rail service, though there have been proposals to extend CTrail's Shore Line East service to Westerly.

Amtrak's Acela also passes by this station, but does not stop.

== History ==
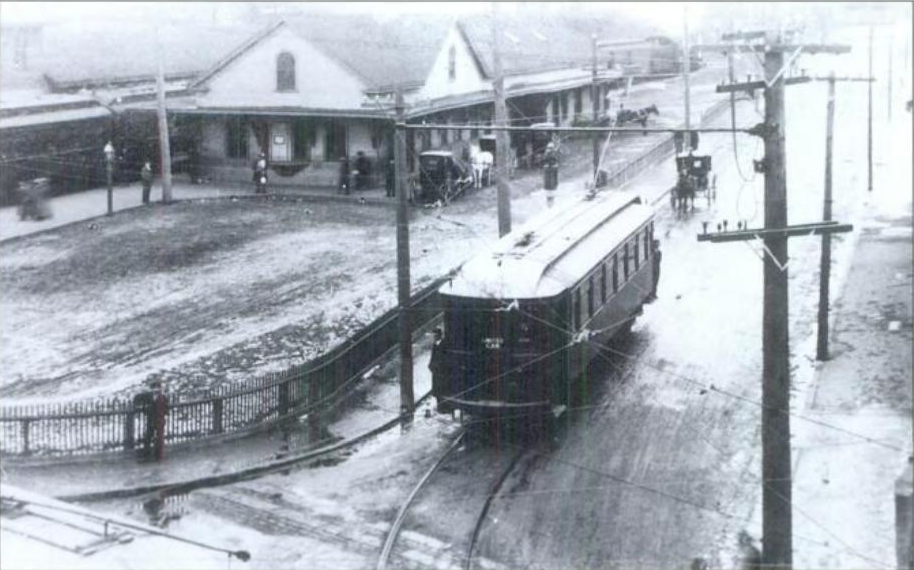
Original depot between 1906 and 1912, with a Norwich and Westerly Railway trolley

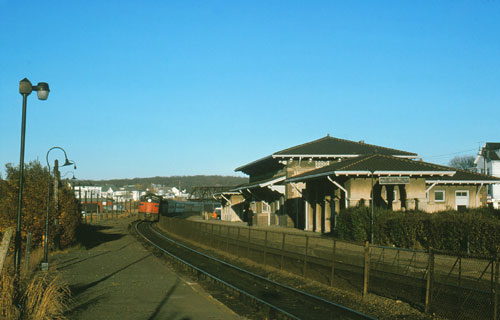
The southbound Senator at Westerly in 1974

The Westerly station opened along with the New York, Providence and Boston Railroad on November 17, 1837. The original depot was a small wooden structure, similar to those still extant at nearby Noank and West Mystic. In 1872, a new station - similar to those still standing at Kingston and East Greenwich - was constructed. It had a pedestrian tunnel (passenger subway) for passengers to reach the westbound platform and shelter.

In 1912–13, the New York, New Haven and Hartford Railroad constructed the present station as part of a curve straightening project. The station building was in the Spanish Colonial Revival style, as were several other New Haven Railroad stations (including Buzzards Bay) built around the same time. The project included the station building, a new pedestrian tunnel, a westbound shelter that enclosed a tunnel entrance, and a shelter for the tunnel entrance on the eastbound side. A two-story brick freight house, now occupied by Westerly Agway, was constructed the same year.

The New Haven Railroad was at that time planning to expand the Northeast Corridor to four tracks along much of the route from New Haven to Boston, especially at busy stations. The bridge abutments to the west of the station over Canal Street and the Pawcatuck River were built for four tracks, although only two-track bridges were ever built. The line was rebuilt for three tracks from just east of the station to just west of Bradford, Rhode Island, with three-track bridges and cuts. A maintenance road now occupies the third track slot.

The station received a $2 million renovation in 1998 that restored it to its original state. As part of the project, a lift system was installed in the passenger subway.

Amtrak closed the Westerly ticket office on October 1, 2016, ceasing all ticketing and passenger assistance services. The building was reopened on August 17, 2018; the waiting area serves as an art gallery and is open on certain days of the week, and for special events.

Weekday stopping service was scheduled to increase from three northbound and four southbound trains to six northbound and five southbound trains on March 16, 2020. However, on that date Amtrak temporarily reduced Northeast Corridor service due to the COVID-19 pandemic.

Work began in early 2020 on accessibility improvements at Westerly, including two elevators to replace existing incline lifts in the stairways to the under-track passage. The work was completed in July 2022. In February 2026, the state indicated plans to apply for a $6.5 million Federal Railroad Administration grant to construct "mini-high" platforms for accessible boarding at the station. If the grant is awarded, the platforms would be completed by August 2029.
