= Branford station =

Railway station in Branford, Connecticut

Branford
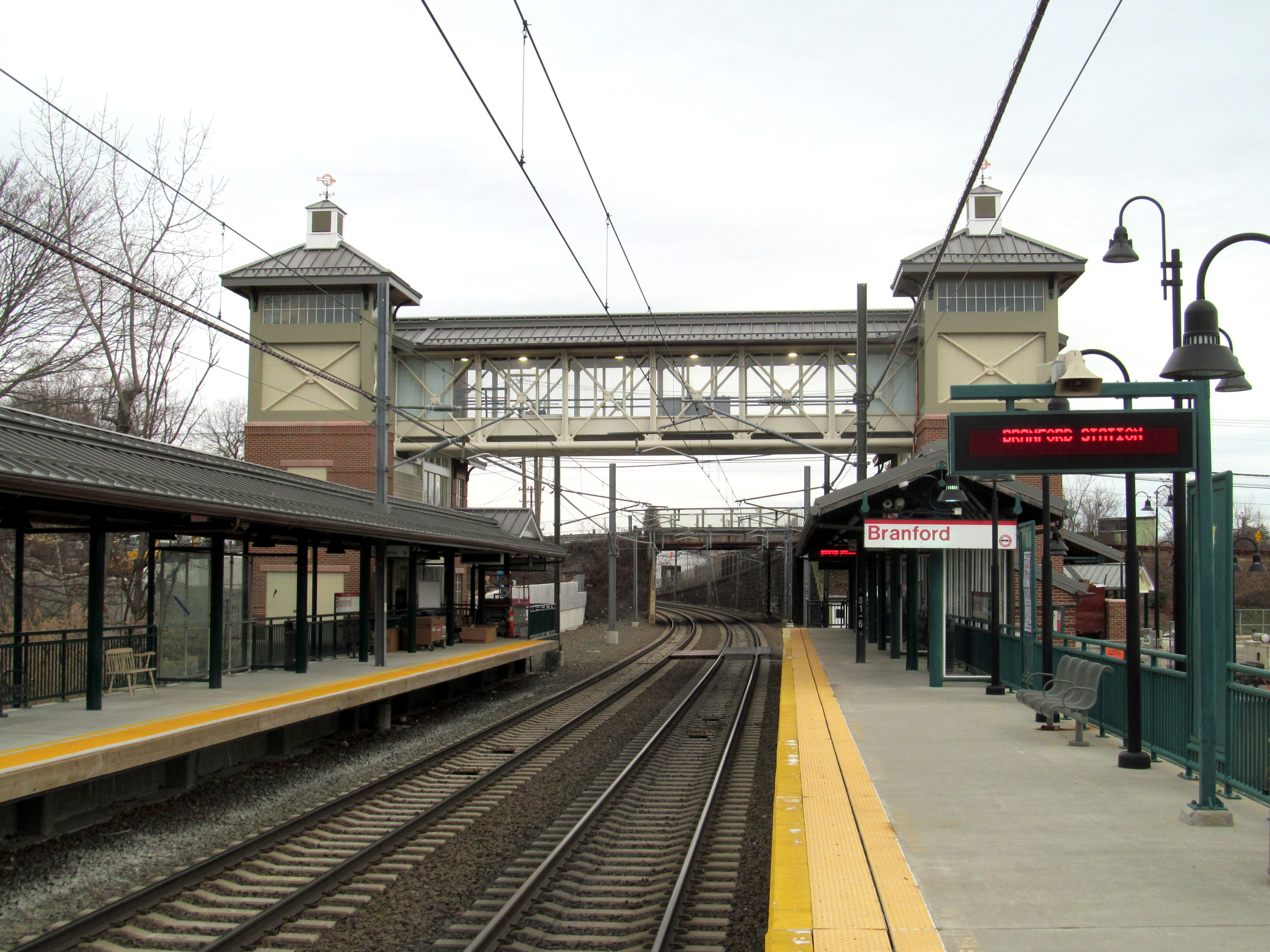
- Branford station in December 2015, with the second platform and pedestrian bridge near completion

General information
- Location: 39 Maple Street; Branford, Connecticut
- Coordinates: 41.2746°N 72.8173°W
- Owner: ConnDOT
- Line: Amtrak Northeast Corridor
- Platforms: 2 side platforms
- Tracks: 2

Construction
- Accessible: Yes

Other information
- Station code: Amtrak: BNF

History
- Opened: May 29, 1990
- Rebuilt: August 8, 2005; November 5, 2016

Passengers
- 2019: 113 daily boardings

Services
Preceding station	CT Rail	Following station
New Haven State Street toward New Haven Union Station or Stamford	Shore Line East	Guilford toward New London
Former services
Preceding station	Amtrak	Following station
New Haven Terminus	Beacon Hill	Madison toward Boston South
New Haven Terminus	Clamdigger	Stony Creek toward New London
Preceding station	New York, New Haven and Hartford Railroad	Following station
New Haven Terminus	Shore Line	Pine Orchard toward Boston
Location

Branford station is a station on the Northeast Corridor located in Branford, Connecticut, and served by CT Rail Shore Line East commuter rail service.

== History ==
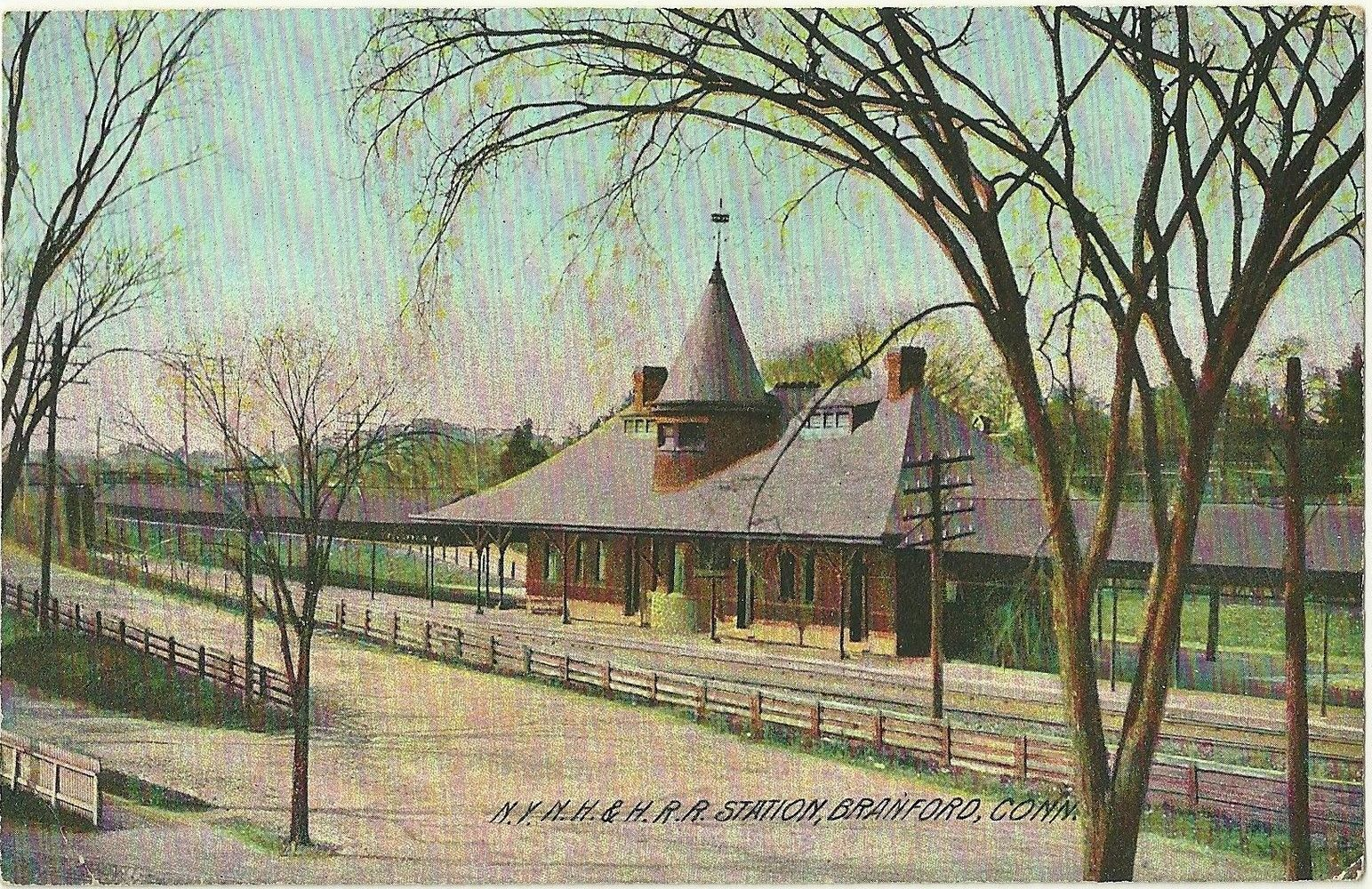
Branford station around 1910

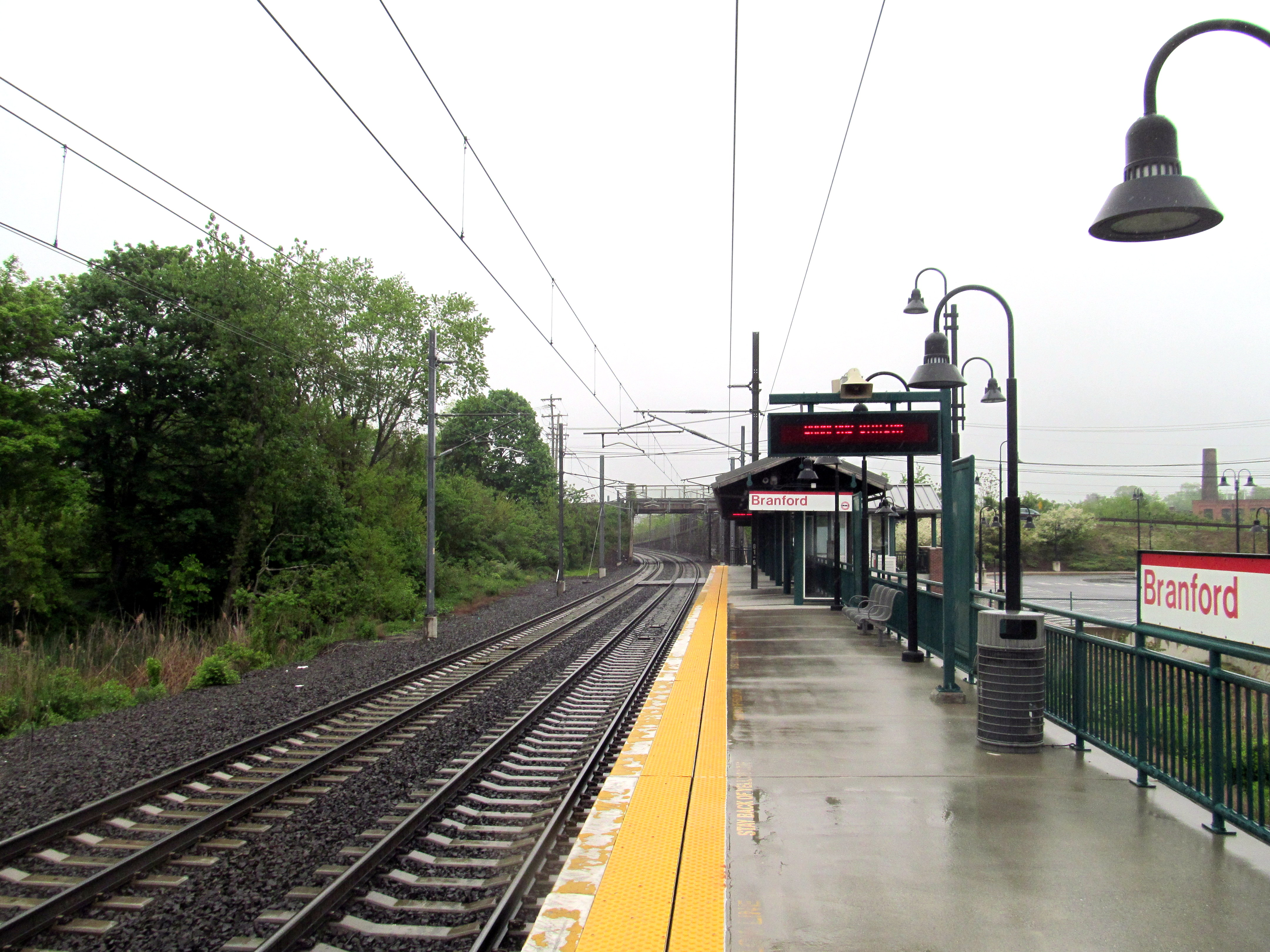
The 2005-built single platform at Branford in 2013, prior to the addition of the pedestrian bridge and second platform

Prior to the establishment of the Shore Line East system on May 29, 1990, Branford was a stop for Amtrak's Beacon Hill trains. The current station, with an accessible-compliant high-level side platform, opened on August 8, 2005, replacing a nearby earlier station with low-level platforms.

Ridership increases rendered the 199-spot parking lot at Branford insufficient. As a result, a 272-spot expansion was opened in June 2011, bringing total available parking at the station to 471 spots. However, the expanded lot has consistently failed to be fully used, leading to calls for it to be replaced by transit oriented development and a smaller parking deck.

A second platform on the north side of the tracks was originally to be constructed beginning in November 2012. Construction on the $16.5M project–which includes the new platform, a pedestrian overpass with elevators, a drop-off lot on the north side of the tracks, and restoration of an existing parking lot–began in September 2013. Major construction took place in 2014 with the intention to open the new platform by August 2015. However, delays were suffered from Amtrak taking 70 days to allow ConnDOT crews to enter the property, and for 300 days for the redesign of retaining walls and the completion of maintenance closets.

By September 2015, the new platform and pedestrian bridge were scheduled to open on December 18, 2015, but this was delayed into 2016 due to the previous harsh winter and components for a train warning system being unavailable. By late May 2016, the station was expected to open in mid to late June. The north-side drop-off area and pedestrian bridge were opened on September 30, 2016, although trains did not immediately use the north platform. Service using the north platform–including stops on some trains that formerly bypassed Branford–began on November 5, 2016.

== Other train stations in Branford ==
Downtown Branford was not the only part of Branford with a train station. Stations were located at Pine Orchard (off Totoket Road) and Stony Creek (off Thimble Island Road) in Stony Creek. Both stops served the Clamdigger until it was discontinued on January 28, 1972. Stony Creek was also a stop on a later reincarnation of the Clamdigger, which ran for three months in 1978 before it was replaced by the Beacon Hill.

== Station layout ==
Branford has two high-level side platforms, each two cars long. Before 10:00am, westbound trains use Track 2 and eastbound trains use Track 1. After 10:00am, westbound trains use Track 1 and eastbound use Track 2. On weekends, this swap occurs around 1:00pm.
