= Old Saybrook station =

Regional rail station in Connecticut, US

Old Saybrook, CT
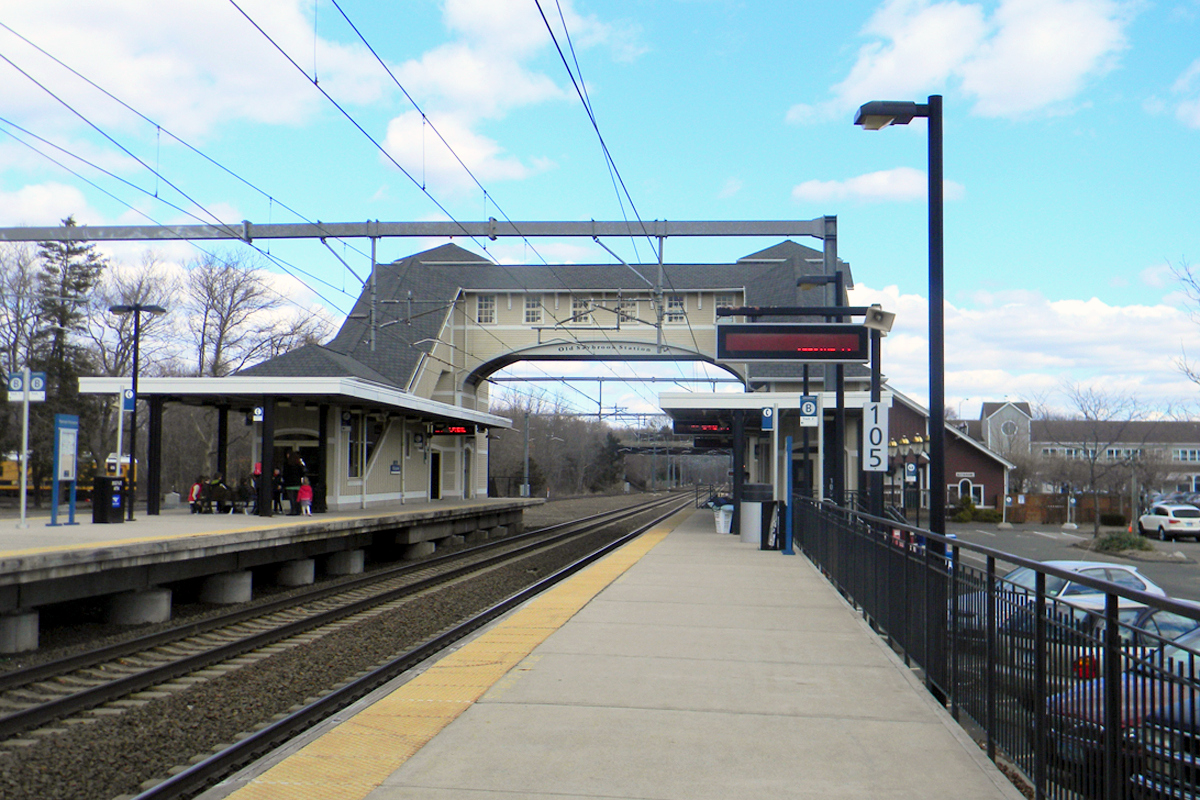
- Old Saybrook station in March 2011

General information
- Location: 455 Boston Post Road; Old Saybrook, Connecticut; United States
- Coordinates: 41.3004°N 72.3770°W
- Owner: Amtrak
- Lines: Amtrak Northeast Corridor; Connecticut Valley Railroad
- Platforms: 1 side platform and 1 island platform
- Tracks: 3
- Connections: River Valley Transit: 641, 642, 643, 644; CTtransit Hartford: 921

Construction
- Parking: 324 spaces (Shore Line East); 53 spaces (Amtrak); Paid private lot
- Accessible: Yes

Other information
- Station code: Amtrak: OSB

History
- Opened: 1873
- Rebuilt: November 1, 2002

Passengers
- FY 2025: 87,196 (Amtrak)
- 2019: 144 daily boardings (Shore Line East)

Services
Preceding station	Amtrak	Following station
New Haven toward Norfolk, Newport News or Roanoke	Northeast Regional	New London toward Boston South
Acela does not stop here
Preceding station	CT Rail	Following station
Westbrook toward New Haven Union Station or Stamford	Shore Line East	New London Terminus
Former services
Preceding station	New York, New Haven and Hartford Railroad	Following station
Westbrook toward New Haven	Shore Line	Waterford toward Boston
Essex toward Hartford	Valley Branch	Terminus
Location

Old Saybrook station is a regional rail station in Old Saybrook, Connecticut. It is served by both Amtrak Northeast Regional intercity trains and CT Rail Shore Line East commuter service.

== Service ==
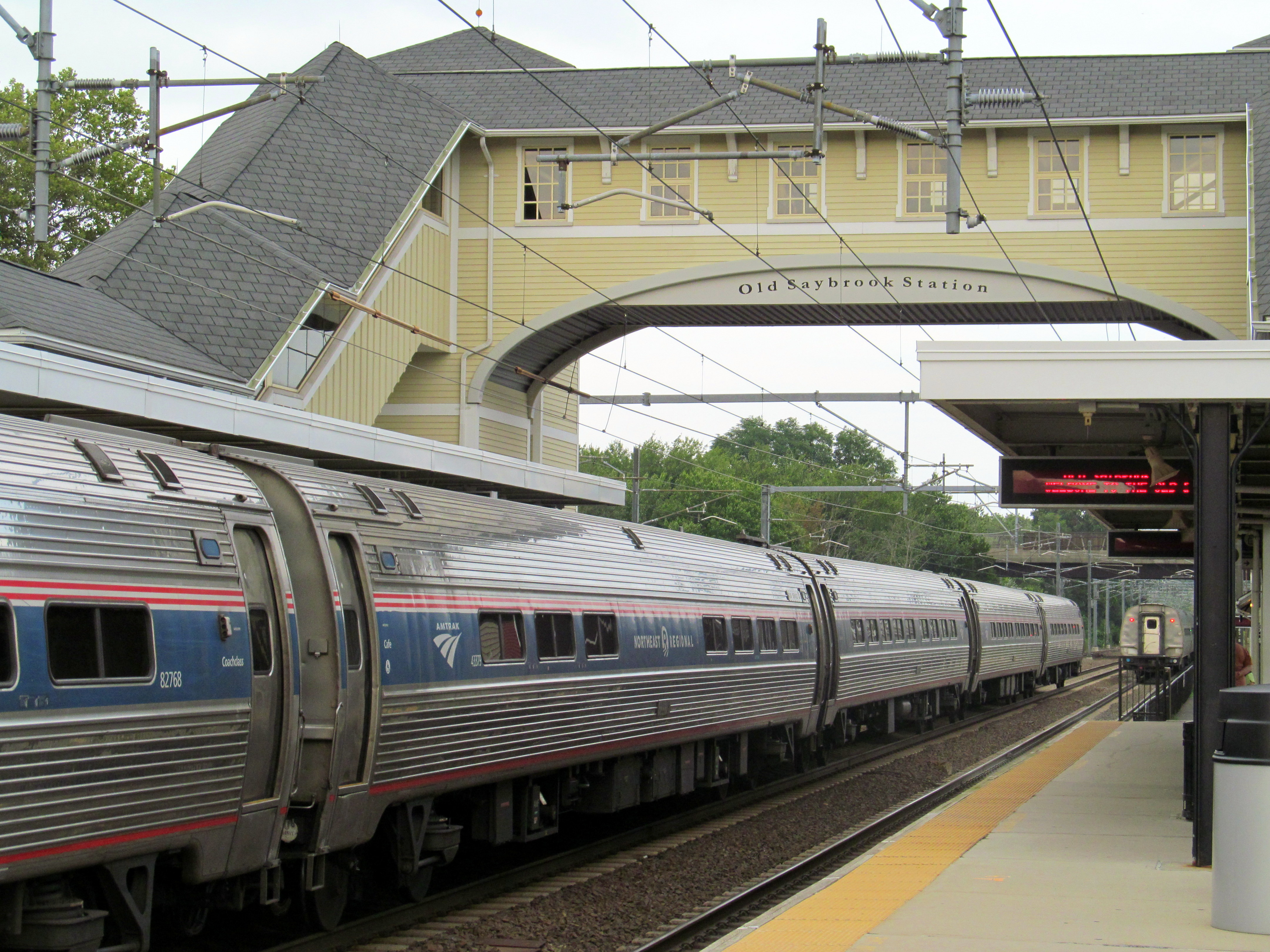
Two Northeast Regional trains at Old Saybrook

Located on the Northeast Corridor, the busiest passenger railway in the United States, Old Saybrook station serves some of the rail services that pass through the station. Most Northeast Regional trains stop at Old Saybrook. No high-speed Acela trains serve the station, but they can be transferred to at New Haven to the west. However, all Shore Line East commuter rail trains stop at Old Saybrook; it serves as the eastern terminus for some trains. New London is the eastern terminus of the line, with approximately half terminating there.

Old Saybrook features a common track setup, with one island platform and one side platform, each two cars long. Unlike the two-track commuter-rail-only stations on the 50.7-mile (81.6 km) stretch of the Northeast Corridor between New Haven and New London, there are three tracks at Old Saybrook, in order to handle terminal trains on Shore Line East.

== History ==
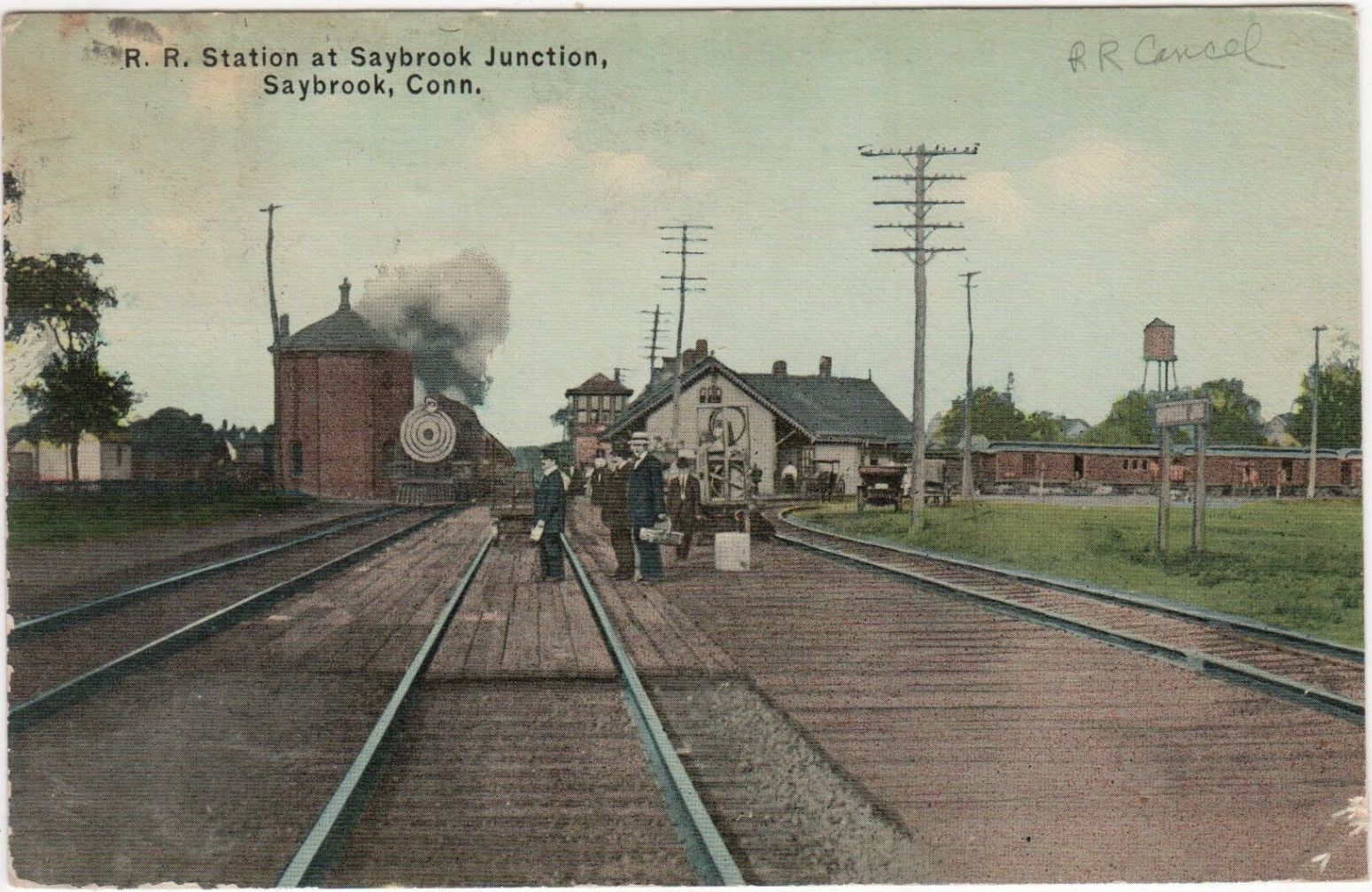
1915 postcard of Saybrook Junction station

The V-shaped wood frame station at Saybrook Junction, constructed in 1873 by the New York, New Haven and Hartford Railroad, originally served that company as well as the Connecticut Valley Railroad. Passengers of both lines used separate platforms but shared the waiting room.

In the mid-1980s, Amtrak leased 5 acres (2.0 ha) of land around the station for the Saybrook Junction Marketplace development. It was one of the first times that Amtrak offered a long-term lease to a private entity to encourage transit-oriented development around a station.

In 2002, a $2.6 million project added high-level platforms and a pedestrian bridge, making the station fully handicapped accessible. The new platforms opened on November 1, 2002.

=== Parking ===
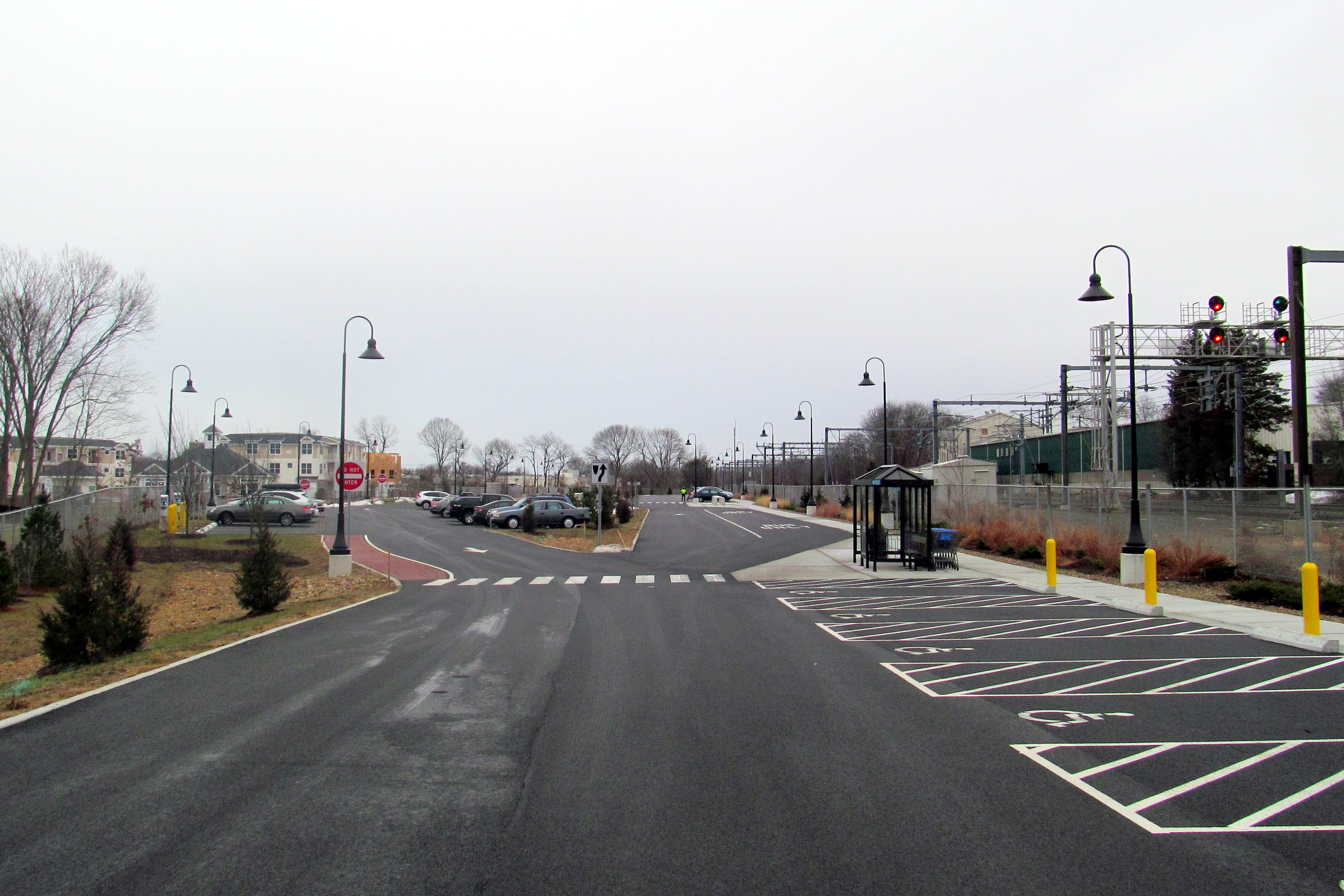
The new parking area in December 2016

By the mid-2000s, ridership increases rendered the station's 137-space free parking lot for Shore Line East riders insufficient, causing commuters to park in the adjacent Saybrook Junction Marketplace parking lot and along roads in town. In November 2011, the Marketplace began charging a fee for commuters to park in their lot.

In March 2013, local officials announced plans for a state-funded 200-space parking lot west of North Main Street between the Upper Cemetery and the tracks. By September 2013, construction was planned to begin on the 3.6 acres (1.5 ha) site in late 2014. The state bought the land for $1.577 million in March 2014. In July 2014, the town received a $999,900 state grant to add sidewalks to North Main Street to improve pedestrian access to the station. The new parking lot was finished in December 2015, but opening was delayed because the handicapped-accessible ramps from the lot to the station were not yet finished. After a deal was brokered for the temporary use of handicapped spaces belonging to the Saybrook Station development, the 199-space lot opened on February 4, 2016. The new lot increased Shore Line East parking to 324 spaces and allowed overnight parking for the first time.
