= USCGC Hammerhead =

United States Coast Guard patrol boat

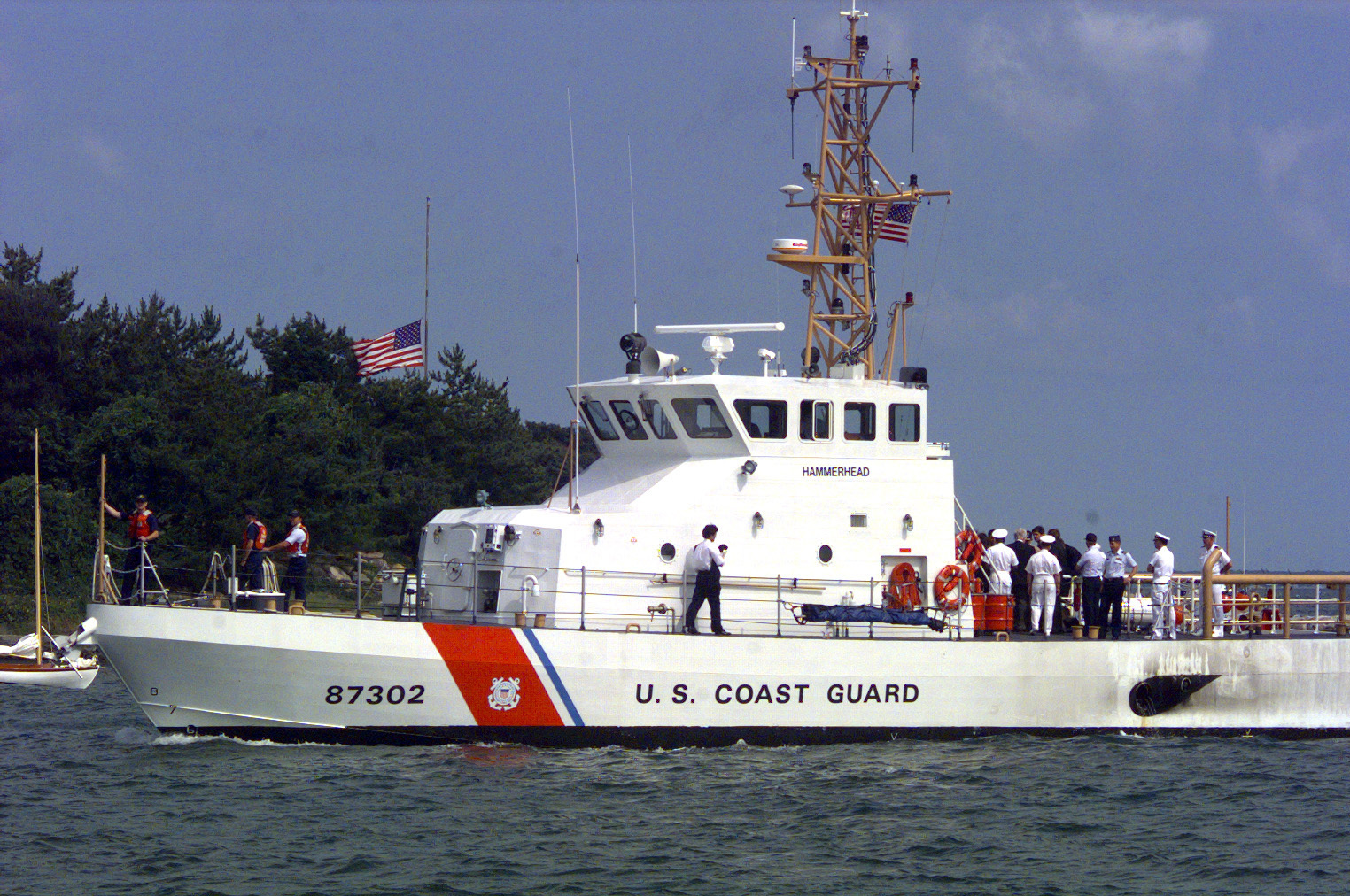
- Hammerhead carries members of the Kennedy family back to Woods Hole after the burial at sea of John F. Kennedy Jr. in July 1999

History

United States
- Name: Hammerhead
- Namesake: Hammerhead shark
- Operator: United States Coast Guard
- Builder: Bollinger Shipyards, Lockport, Louisiana
- Commissioned: 1998
- Home port: Woods Hole, Massachusetts
- Identification: Hull number: WPB-87302
- Status: In active service

General characteristics
- Class & type: Marine Protector-class patrol boat
- Length: 87 ft (27 m)

USCGC Hammerhead (WPB-87302) is an 87-foot (27 m) Marine Protector-class patrol boat of the United States Coast Guard, based at Coast Guard Station Woods Hole in Woods Hole, Massachusetts. It was commissioned in 1998 and works for Coast Guard Sector Southeastern New England in the waters around Cape Cod, Martha's Vineyard, Nantucket and Block Island. In July 1999 Hammerhead carried members of the Kennedy and Bessette families back to shore after the burial at sea of John F. Kennedy Jr., his wife Carolyn and her sister Lauren Bessette.

== Design ==
Hammerhead is one of the Marine Protector-class coastal patrol boats built for the Coast Guard by Bollinger Shipyards of Lockport, Louisiana, under a contract first awarded on March 13, 1996. The class replaced the older 82-foot Point-class cutters. Hammerhead carries the second hull number of the class after Barracuda (WPB-87301).

== Service history ==
=== Kennedy burial at sea ===
In July 1999 John F. Kennedy Jr., his wife Carolyn Bessette Kennedy and her sister Lauren Bessette died when the plane he was piloting crashed into the Atlantic off Martha's Vineyard. Their ashes were scattered at sea from the U.S. Navy destroyer USS Briscoe on July 22, 1999. The Coast Guard provided security for the family on the trip to and from the destroyer. As Briscoe headed back toward Woods Hole, it stopped and transferred the mourners to Hammerhead, which brought them to shore at Coast Guard Group Woods Hole.

=== Search and rescue ===
On January 28, 2016, the 50-foot (15 m) fishing boat Lois Virginia became disabled about 30 miles (48 km) south of Block Island with two people aboard. Hammerhead was diverted to help and escorted the fishing boat and a good Samaritan boat towing it, in heavy seas and snow. A response boat from Coast Guard Station Point Judith then took over the tow near Block Island and brought Lois Virginia to shore.

On the evening of March 17, 2018, the Steamship Authority ferry Martha's Vineyard lost power on its way from Woods Hole to Martha's Vineyard. Hammerhead and a response boat from Station Woods Hole stood by while a commercial tow was arranged and the ferry anchored outside Vineyard Haven.

In July 2024 the 42-foot (13 m) fishing vessel Overland became disabled and began taking on water about 17 miles (27 km) south of Siasconset on Nantucket. Hammerhead was diverted from operations at an offshore wind farm and reached the vessel first. Its crew stabilized the boat until a motor lifeboat from Station Brant Point arrived and took it in tow.

=== Public events ===
On August 19, 2022, Hammerhead was displayed at City Pier in New London, Connecticut, alongside the training ship Eagle, at a ceremony marking the construction of the National Coast Guard Museum.

== See also ==
- List of United States Coast Guard cutters
