= George M. Notter =

American architect and preservationist (1933–2007)

- Born: August 7, 1933; Jacksonville, Florida
- Died: December 26, 2007 (aged 74); Rockville, Maryland
- Occupation: Architect
- Awards: Fellow, American Institute of Architects (1978)
- Practice: Finegold Alexander Architects

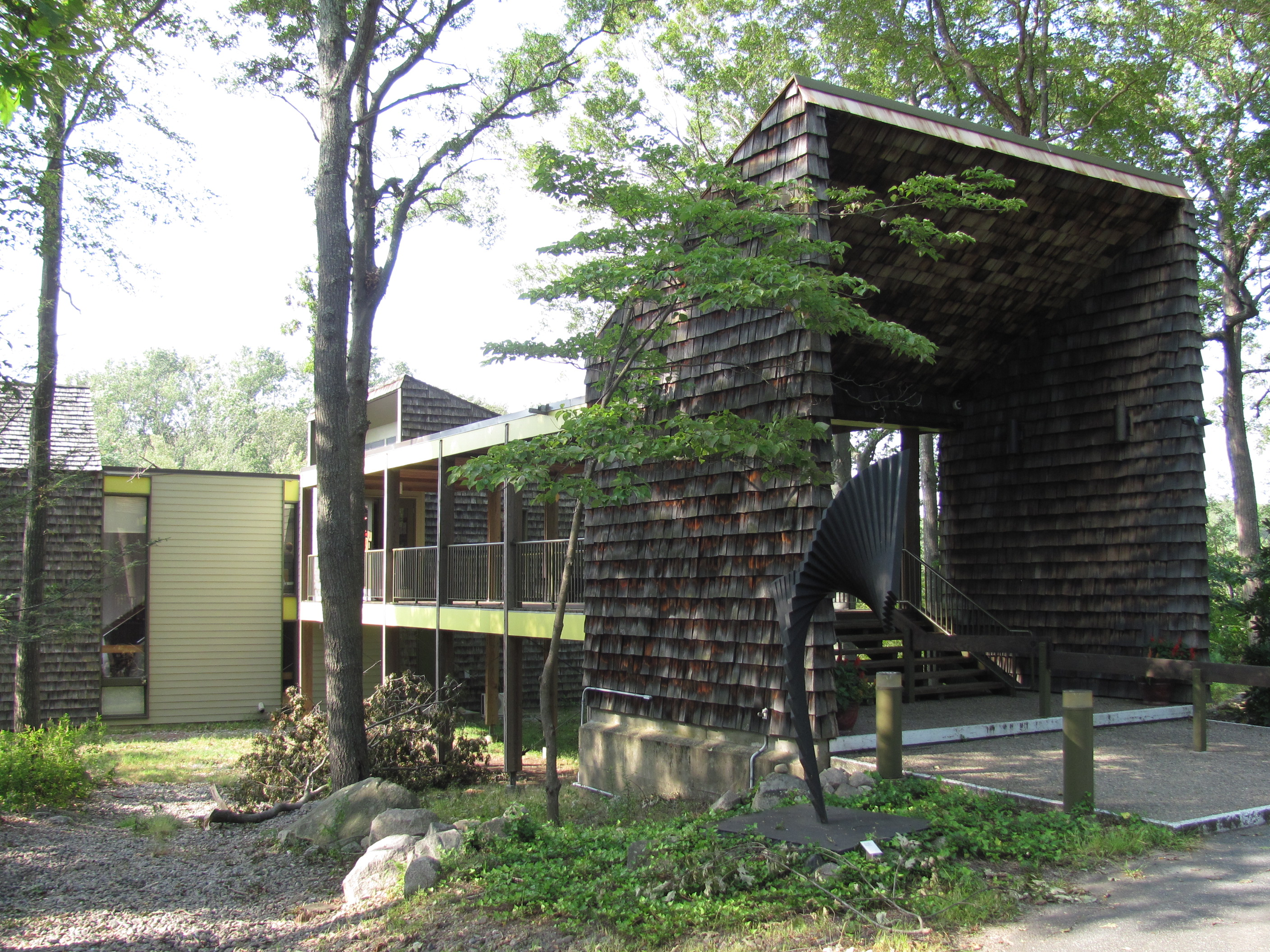
The Fuller Craft Museum in Brockton, Massachusetts, designed by Notter for J. Timothy Anderson & Associates and completed in 1969.

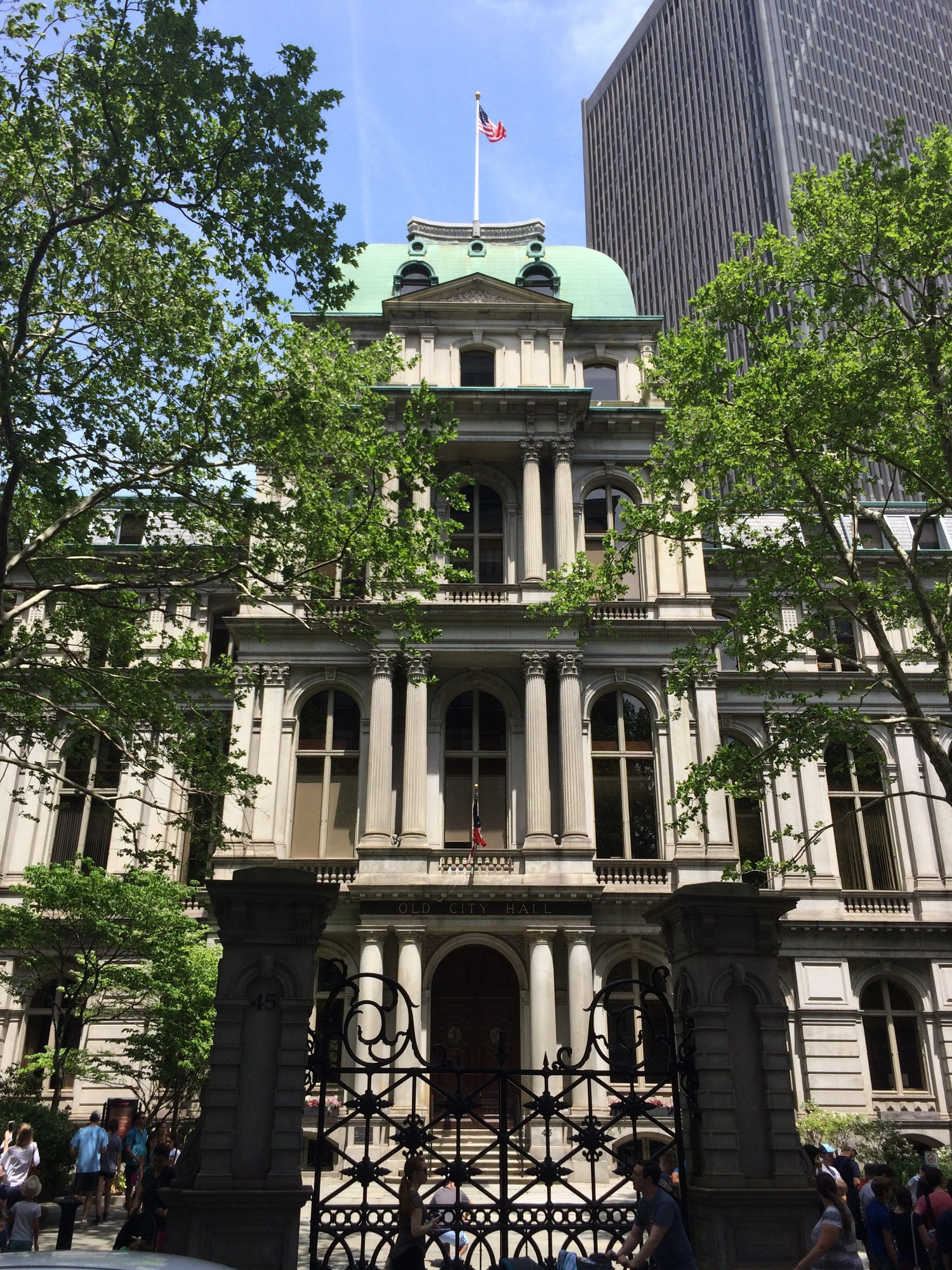
Old City Hall in Boston, originally completed in 1865 and adapted for commercial uses in 1971 to designs by Anderson Notter Associates.

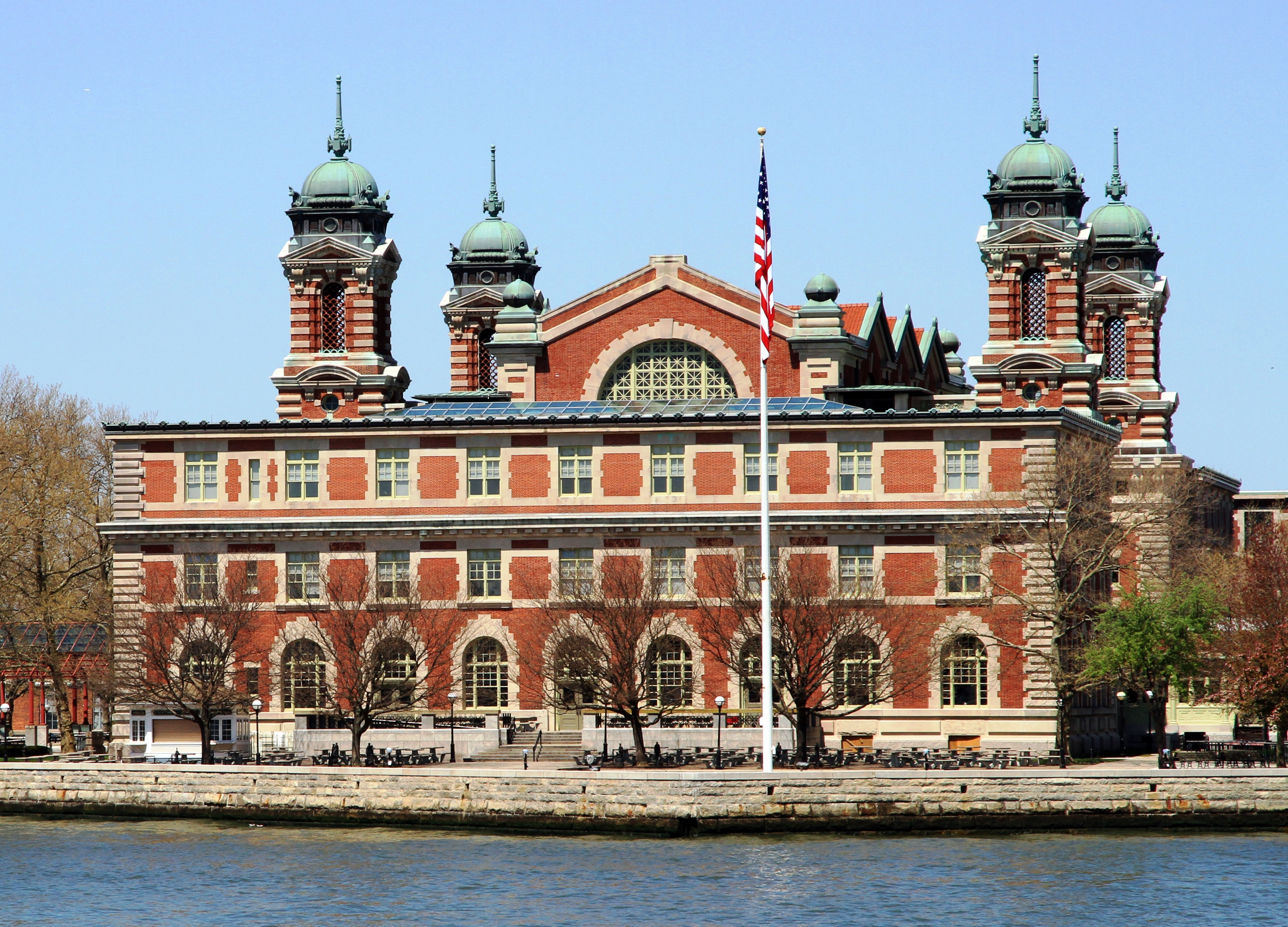
The Main Building of Ellis Island, restored and renovated for museum use by Beyer Blinder Belle and Notter Finegold & Alexander, completed in 1990.

George M. Notter FAIA (August 7, 1933 – December 26, 2007) was an American architect and preservationist. He is best known for his work completed while a member of the Boston firm now known as Finegold Alexander Architects between 1965 and 1992. He served as president of the American Institute of Architects for the year 1984.

== Life and career ==
George Madison Notter Jr. was born August 7, 1933, in Jacksonville, Florida to George Madison Notter, a contractor, and Ione (Nichols) Notter. He was educated in the Jacksonville Beach public schools and at Harvard University, earning an AB in 1955 followed by an MArch from the Harvard Graduate School of Design in 1958. He spent the next two years as a planning engineer with the United States Air Force and in 1960 joined the Birmingham, Michigan office of Minoru Yamasaki. He became a licensed architect in 1961 and in 1965 returned to Boston, where he joined the firm of his former classmate J. Timothy Anderson. Early projects by Notter for J. Timothy Anderson & Associates include the Fuller Craft Museum in Brockton, completed in 1969. In 1970 the firm became Anderson Notter Associates and in 1971 they completed the adaptive reuse of Boston's Old City Hall into commercial space. This was a pioneering example of the type and in 1976 was awarded an AIA Honor Award for extended use. This led to other projects such as the New London Union Station in which Anderson Notter Associates was a primary investor. Other restoration and reuse projects include:

- Mechanics Hall, Worcester, Massachusetts (1977)
- Cabot House and Pforzheimer House, Harvard University, Cambridge, Massachusetts (1986)
- Sidney R. Yates Federal Building, Washington, D.C. (1987)
- Ellis Island, (Note: Beyer Blinder Belle/Notter Finegold & Alexander, architects.) New York City (1990)
- William Jefferson Clinton Federal Building, Washington, D.C. (1993)

In 1984 the firm became Notter Finegold & Alexander with the retirement of Anderson. With his election as president of the AIA Notter moved to Washington, D.C. where he established a presence for the firm. In 1992 he withdrew to establish Notter & Associates in Washington, renamed Notter Architects in 1995. His partner during his last years of practice was fellow preservation architect John K. Mott. His last major project was the Heinz History Center in Pittsburgh, completed in 1996. (Note: Bohlin Cywinski Jackson, architect; Notter Architects, associate.) His illness obligated his retirement the same year.

Notter joined the American Institute of Architects in 1967 as a member of the Boston Society of Architects (BSA) and the Massachusetts State Association of Architects (MSAA), which were merged in 1989. He served as the president of the BSA in 1976, of the MSAA in 1978 and served as AIA regional director from New England from 1978 to 1980. He served as a vice president of the AIA in 1981 and in 1982 he was elected first vice president/president elect for 1983 and president for 1984. As president Notter built on the initiatives of his predecessor Robert C. Broshar to make architects active members of their community. He was elected a fellow of the AIA in 1978 and was elected to honorary membership in the Royal Architectural Institute of Canada (RAIC) and the Federation of Colleges of Architects of the Mexican Republic (FCARM).

Notter was involved in several other preservation-oriented organizations including the National Trust for Historic Preservation, the Society of Architectural Historians, the Society for the Preservation of New England Antiquities and the Victorian Society in America and was president of the Society for Industrial Archeology for the year 1978.

== Personal life ==
Notter was married in 1959 to Sarah McIntyre Wolfe. They had two children and divorced in 1979. He remarried in 1987. He began suffering from Alzheimer's disease in his 60s, which forced his retirement in 1996. He died December 26, 2007, in Rockville, Maryland at the age of 74.
