= Finegold Alexander Architects =

Practice information
- Founders: J. Timothy Anderson; George M. Notter
- Founded: 1961
- Location: Boston

Website
- www.faainc.com

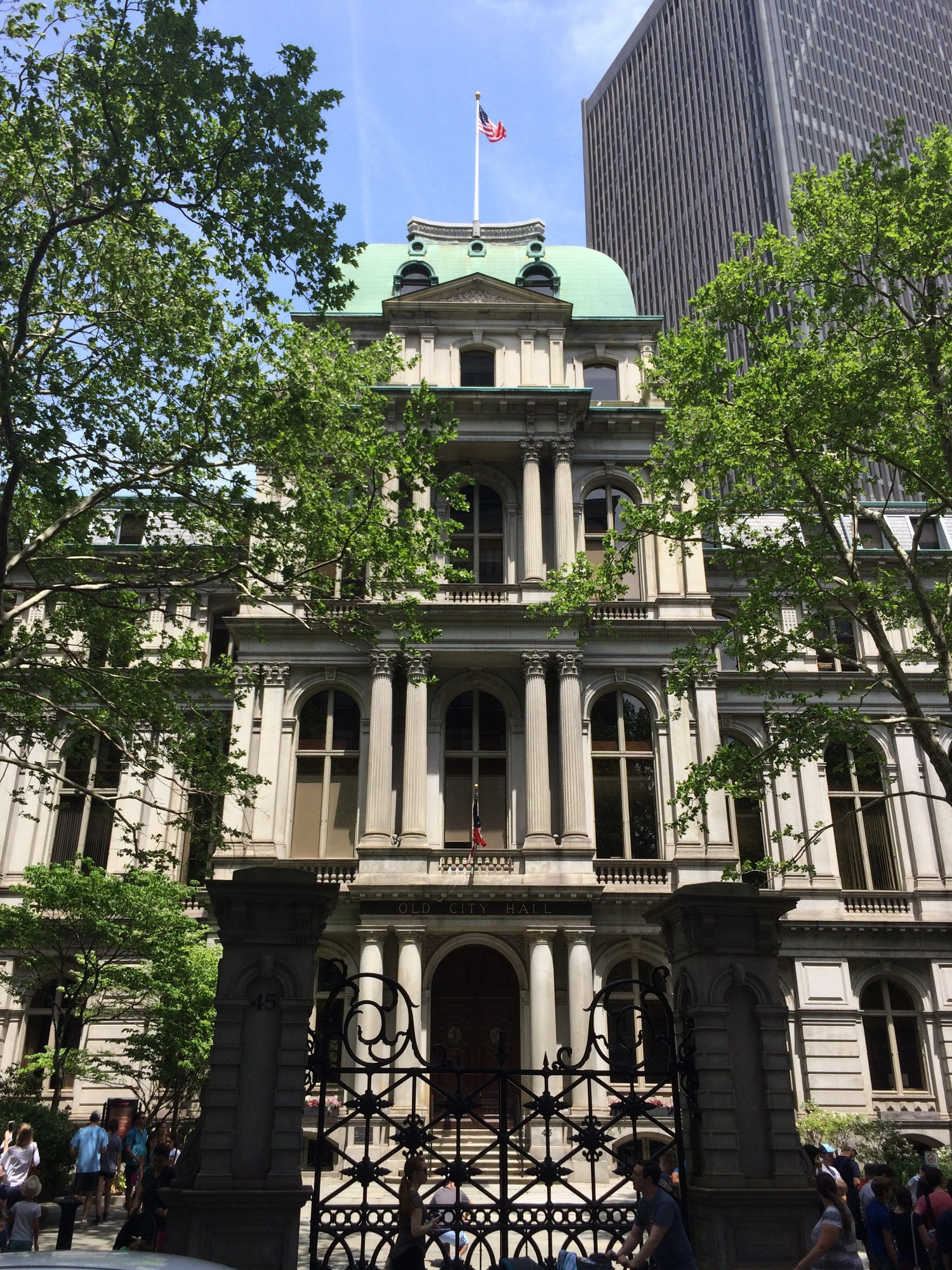
Old City Hall in Boston, originally completed in 1865 and adapted for commercial uses in 1971 to designs by Anderson Notter Associates.

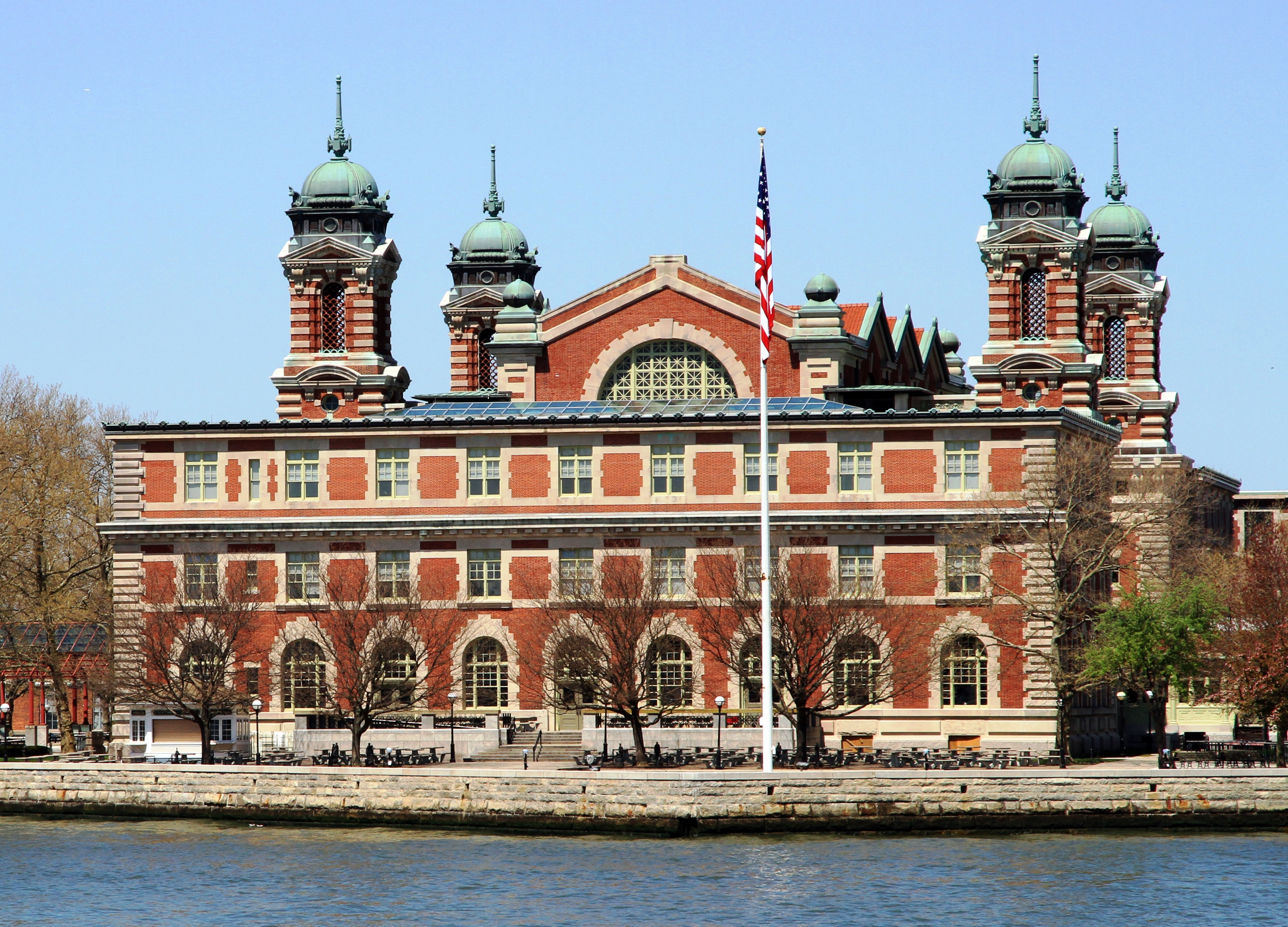
The Main Building of Ellis Island, restored and renovated for museum use by Beyer Blinder Belle and Notter Finegold & Alexander, completed in 1990.

Finegold Alexander Architects is an architecture firm based in Boston, Massachusetts. Founded in 1961 as J. Timothy Anderson & Associates, the firm is best known for its work in the field of adaptive reuse.

== History ==
Finegold Alexander Architects was established in Boston in 1961 as J. Timothy Anderson & Associates by J. Timothy Anderson (1932-2001), a 1958 graduate of the Harvard Graduate School of Design. In 1965 he was joined by his former classmate George M. Notter (1933-2007) and in 1970 the firm was renamed Anderson Notter Associates. In 1976 Anderson Notter received the first AIA Honor Award for Extended Use for the 1971 conversion of Boston's Old City Hall to a private office and restaurant use. In 1977 Maurice Finegold (born 1932) became a principal and the firm was renamed Anderson Notter Finegold. In 1984 Anderson retired, James Alexander became a principal and the firm was renamed Notter Finegold & Alexander.

In 1992 Notter, who had been managing the firm's Washington, D.C. office, retired to establish his own practice, and the firm became Finegold Alexander & Associates. This name was changed to Finegold Alexander + Associates in 2011 and to the present Finegold Alexander Architects in 2015. Finegold and Alexander retired as principals in 2021. As of 2023 the firm is led by president Rebecca L. Berry, vice president Ellen K. Anselone, treasurer Jeff Garriga, and secretary Regan Shields Ives.

== Architectural works ==
Works by Finegold Alexander Architects and its predecessor firms have included:

- Fuller Craft Museum, Brockton, Massachusetts (1969)
- Old City Hall adaptive reuse, Boston (1971)
- Long Wharf Custom House Block adaptive reuse, Boston (1973)
- New London Union Station adaptive reuse, New London, Connecticut (1976)
- Mechanics Hall restoration, Worcester, Massachusetts (1977)
- Intelsat headquarters, (Note: John Andrews, architect; Notter Finegold & Alexander, associate architects) Washington, D.C. (1984 and 1988)
- Cabot House and Pforzheimer House rehabilitation, Harvard University, Cambridge, Massachusetts (1986)
- Sidney R. Yates Federal Building rehabilitation, Washington, D.C. (1987)
- Ellis Island adaptive reuse, (Note: Beyer Blinder Belle and Notter Finegold & Alexander, associated architects) New York City (1990)
- William Jefferson Clinton Federal Building renovation, Washington, D.C. (1993)
- United States Holocaust Memorial Museum, (Note: Pei Cobb Freed & Partners, architects; Finegold Alexander & Associates, associate architects) Washington, D.C. (1993)
- Nott Memorial restoration, Union College, Schenectady, New York (1995)
- Jose V. Toledo Federal Building and United States Courthouse restoration, San Juan, Puerto Rico (1999)
- Union Station rehabilitation, Worcester, Massachusetts (2000)
- Students' Building renovation, Vassar College, Poughkeepsie, New York (2003)
