= Coast Guard Station Woods Hole =

US Coast Guard station in Massachusetts

- Part of 1st District
- Woods Hole, Massachusetts
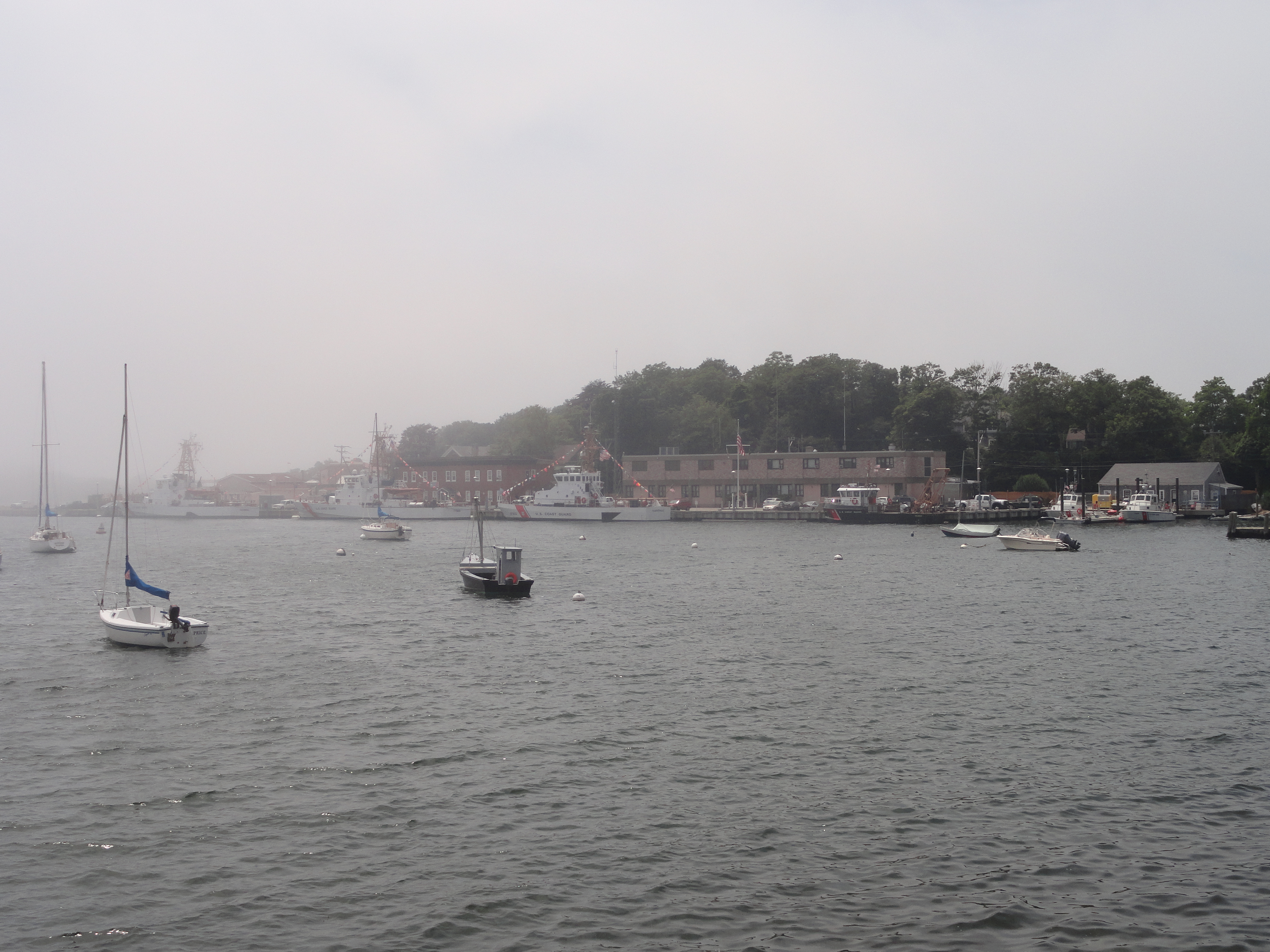
- A view of the ships at the station as seen from the Shining Sea Bikeway

Site information
- Type: Coast Guard Station
- Owner: United States Coast Guard
- Open to the public: Yes

Location
- Coordinates: 41.521°N 70.667°W

Site history
- In use: ?–present

United States Coast Guard Station Woods Hole is a United States Coast Guard station located in Woods Hole, Massachusetts. The station is home to Sector Southeast New England.

== List of Vessels ==
Station Woods Hole serves as home port for the following:

- 25-foot USCG Defender Class patrol boat
- 41-foot USCG Utility Boat
- 49-foot USCG BUSL (Stern-Loading Buoy Boat)
- 87-foot USCGC Hammerhead (WPB-87302, Marine Protector-class coastal patrol boat)
- 110-foot USCG Cutter Monomoy (WPB-1326, Island Class patrol Boat, commissioned 19 May 1989)
- 110-foot USCG Cutter Sanibel (WPB-1312, Island Class patrol Boat, commissioned 1987)
- 110-foot USCG Cutter Tybee (WPB-1330, Island Class patrol Boat, commissioned 1989, re-commissioned 17 May 2007)

== Notable Service ==
- USCGC Monomoy was deployed to the Persian Gulf for Operation Iraqi Freedom in 2004 and continues to serve in that region as of September 2010. One of the crew's primary missions has been layered defense of foreign oil terminals critical to the local economy. The vessel has been forward-ported to Manama, Bahrain.
- On July 22, 1999, USCGC Sanibel served as land-to-ship transport for members of the Kennedy and Bessette families for burial-at-sea services for John F. Kennedy Jr.; his wife, Carolyn Bessette-Kennedy; and her sister Lauren Bessette. The cutter ferried 17 of their family members, including Senator Edward M. Kennedy, from Station Woods Hole to the destroyer USS Briscoe, which was moored off Squibnocket Point on Martha's Vineyard, and from which the ashes of the deceased were scattered into Vineyard Sound.

== See also ==
- List of military installations in Massachusetts
