= USCGC Monomoy (WPB-1326) =

US Coast Guard ship (1989–2022)

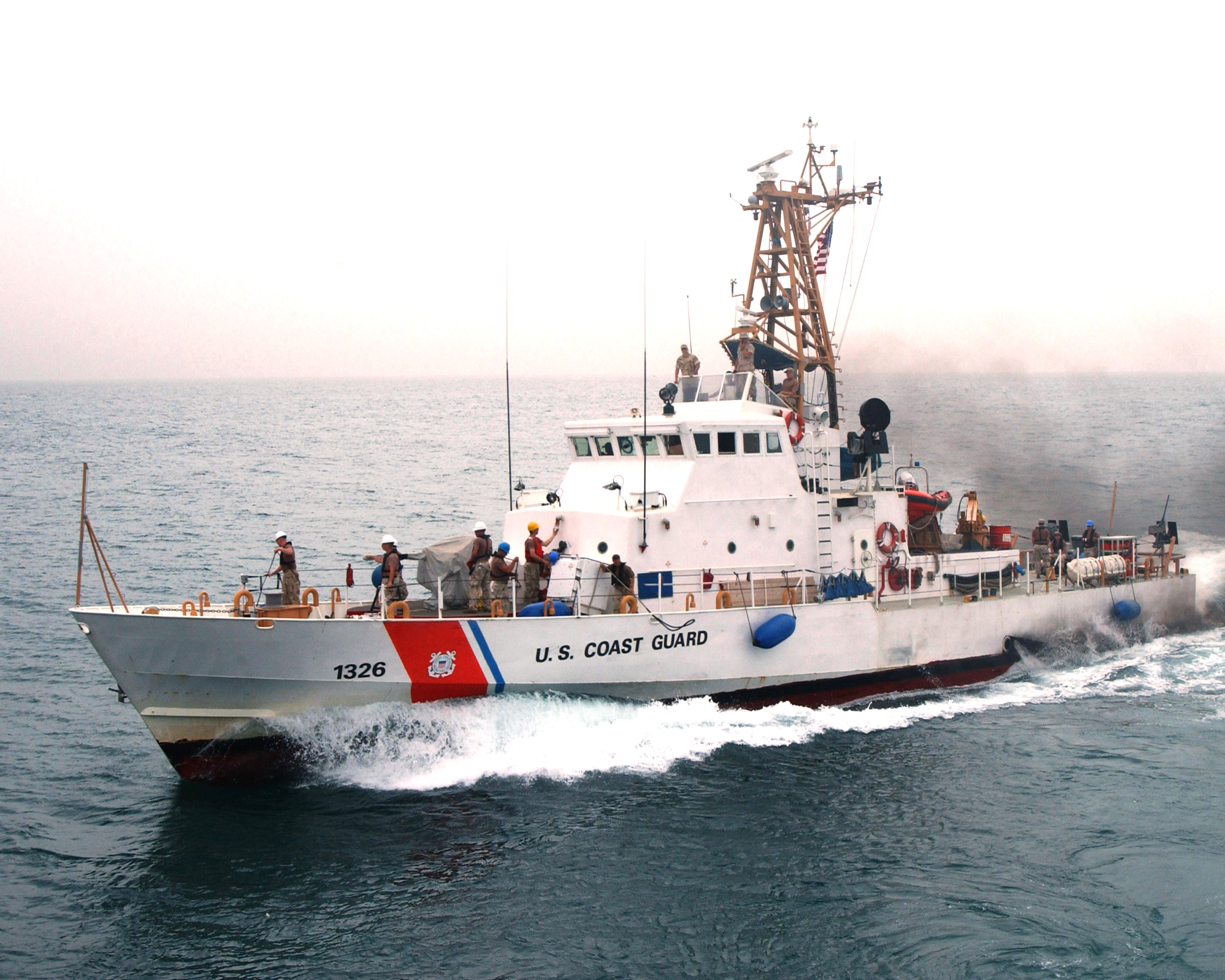
- USCGC Monomoy, April 2005

History

United States
- Name: Monomoy
- Namesake: Monomoy Island, off the southeast coast of Cape Cod in Nantucket Shoals
- Operator: United States Coast Guard
- Builder: Bollinger Machine Ship and Shipyard, Lockport, Louisiana
- Laid down: February 24, 1988
- Launched: October 21, 1988
- Commissioned: May 19, 1989
- Decommissioned: March 22, 2022
- Home port: Coast Guard Station Woods Hole, Woods Hole, Massachusetts
- Motto: Anytime, Anywhere
- Honors and awards: Coast Guard Unit Commendation (2); Coast Guard Meritorious Unit Commendation (2); Department of Transportation Gold Medal for Outstanding Achievement; Coast Guard Bicentennial Unit Commendation; National Defense Service Medal (2); Humanitarian Service Medal; Special Operations Service Ribbon (5)
- Fate: Transferred to Greece
- Status: In service with Greek Navy
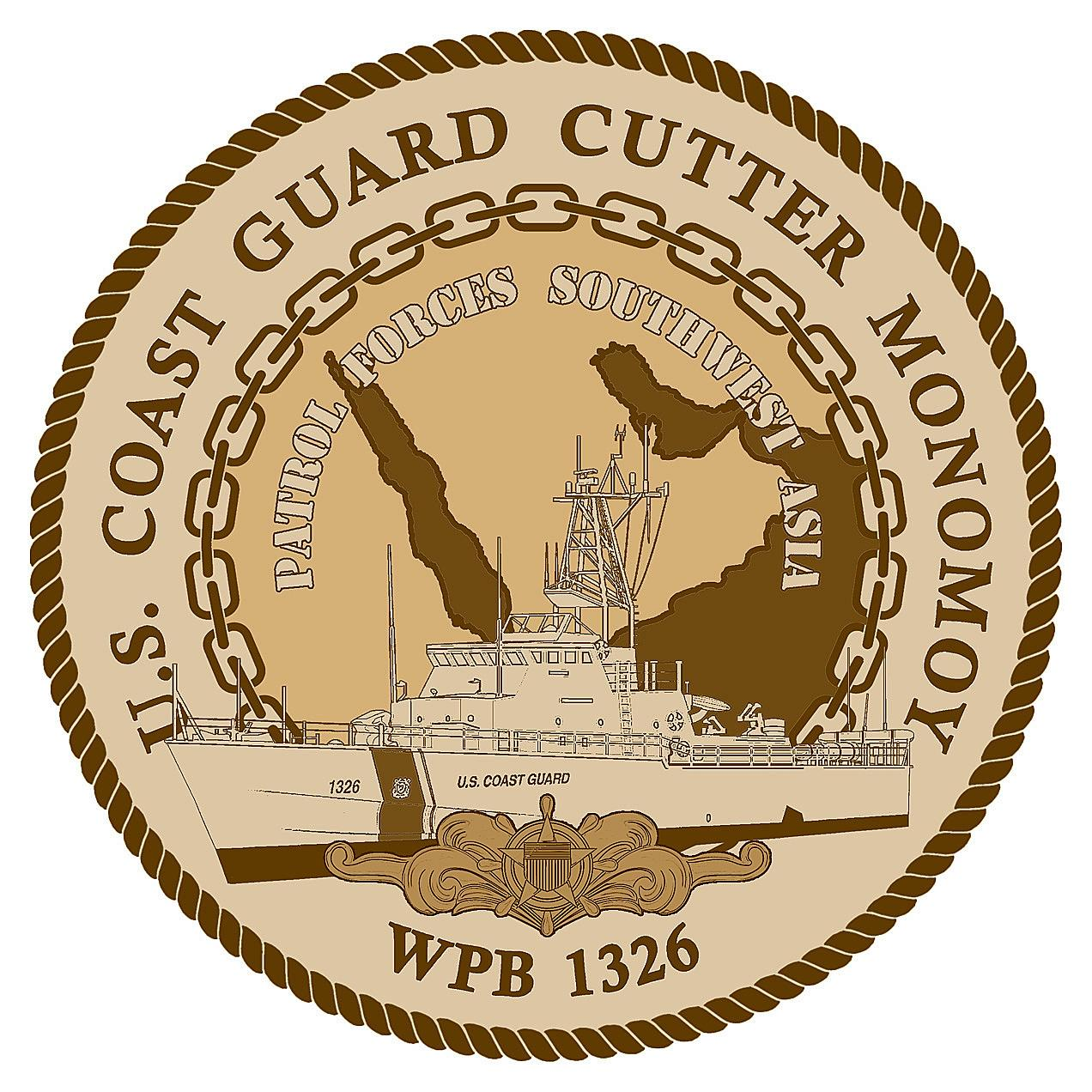
- Badge: USCGC Monomoy Unit Patch

General characteristics
- Class & type: Island-class patrol boat
- Displacement: 168 long tons (171 t)
- Length: 113 ft (34 m)
- Beam: 21 ft (6.4 m)
- Draft: 6.5 ft (2.0 m)
- Propulsion: 2 Paxman Valenta diesel engines
- Speed: 29.5 knots (54.6 km/h; 33.9 mph)
- Range: 3,300 miles (5,300 km)
- Complement: 22 (3 officers, 19 enlisted)
- Sensors & processing systems: AN/SPS-78 radar
- Armament: Mk 38 25 mm chain gun; 5 × M2 .50-cal MG (2 twin & 1 single mount); Mk19 40mm grenade launcher

USCGC Monomoy (WPB-1326) was a United States Coast Guard Island class patrol cutter. She was the 26th ship of her class. The second ship of the Coast Guard to bear the name, Monomoy was named after Monomoy Island which lies off the coast of Cape Cod.

== History ==
Her keel was laid on February 24, 1988 and she was launched on October 21, 1988.

Monomoy was originally commissioned in 1989 in Woods Hole, Massachusetts, at Coast Guard Station Woods Hole. Her missions have included search and rescue, maritime law enforcement, alien interdiction, marine mammal protection and pollution response, homeland security, and presidential security. Monomoy provided security for President Clinton while vacationing on Martha's Vineyard and for George W. Bush while he was in Kennebunkport, Maine.

Between 1994 and 1996, she conducted twenty-five law enforcement patrols in support of Operation Foxwood. Since 1996, Monomoy has conducted over three-hundred law enforcement boardings, including the interception and seizure in 1998 of 920 pounds of cocaine off the coast of Puerto Rico.

Search and rescue is a Monomoy core competency. For rescuing the crew of the fishing vessel True Life, the crew of Monomoy was awarded a Coast Guard Unit Commendation. Another was awarded for the ship's assistance in wreckage recovery after the TWA Flight 800 disaster in 1996. Between 1994 and 1996, Monomoy participated in Operation Able Manner, which resulted in the rescue of seventy-one migrants in the Caribbean whose vessels were foundering, for which the ship was awarded a Coast Guard Meritorious Unit Commendation.

After the September 11 attacks, Monomoy was one of the ships to patrol New York Harbor in District One.

=== Recent service ===
In August 2004, Monomoy was forward deployed to Manama, Bahrain as part of Patrol Forces Southwest Asia in support of Operation Iraqi Freedom and subsequently Operations Enduring Freedom and Inherent Resolve. Serving under the United States Fifth Fleet, she participated in anti-piracy patrols, among other missions. In 2012, while on patrol in the Persian Gulf, Monomoy aided in the rescue of six Iranian sailors from their sinking dhow.

On 26 August 2014, Monomoy was involved in an incident with an armed Iranian dhow in the Persian Gulf. Monomoy launched the cutter small boat to query the dhow. The crew of the dhow pointed a machine gun at the small boat and Monomoy's crew responded with warning shots. The dhow did not respond. No U.S. personnel were harmed and they returned to the cutter. It is not known if the dhow was hit.

On 12 January 2016, Monomoy was involved in the 2016 U.S.–Iran naval incident. According to military sources the two Riverine Command Boats (RCBs) were on a routine transit from Kuwait to Bahrain, which serves as the home port for Task Force 56 under the Fifth Fleet. They were scheduled to refuel with the Monomoy during the transit, however, one RCB developed an engine problem and both boats stopped to solve the mechanical issue. During this time both boats drifted into Iranian waters, resulting in the capture of the RCBs. Monomoy, noting the delay of the RCBs at the rendezvous point and tracking their progress notified the group's parent unit, Task Force 56.7. Monomoy's notification, combined with the actions of a female Navy petty officer who activated an Emergency Position-indicating Radio Beacon (EPIRB) signal, while in Iranian custody, aided the search and rescue operation.Monomoy was subsequently tasked with Combat Search and Rescue efforts inside Iranian territorial waters off Farsi Island to attempt to locate, and if possible, recover the RCB crews.

On 22 March 2022, Monomoy was decommissioned after the arrival of a replacement fast response cutter. She was then transferred to the Greek Navy.
