= USS Briscoe =

Two ships of the United States Navy have borne the name Briscoe.

- USS Briscoe (APA-65), was a Gilliam-class attack transport laid down in 1944, served during World War II, and decommissioned in 1946. This ship was named in honor of Briscoe County, Texas.
- USS Briscoe (DD-977), was a Spruance-class destroyer laid down in 1975 and decommissioned in 2003. This ship was named in honor of Admiral Robert P. Briscoe.
