= Fuller Craft Museum =

Museum in Brockton, Massachusetts, United States

Coordinates: 42°6′9.4″N 71°2′43.3″W

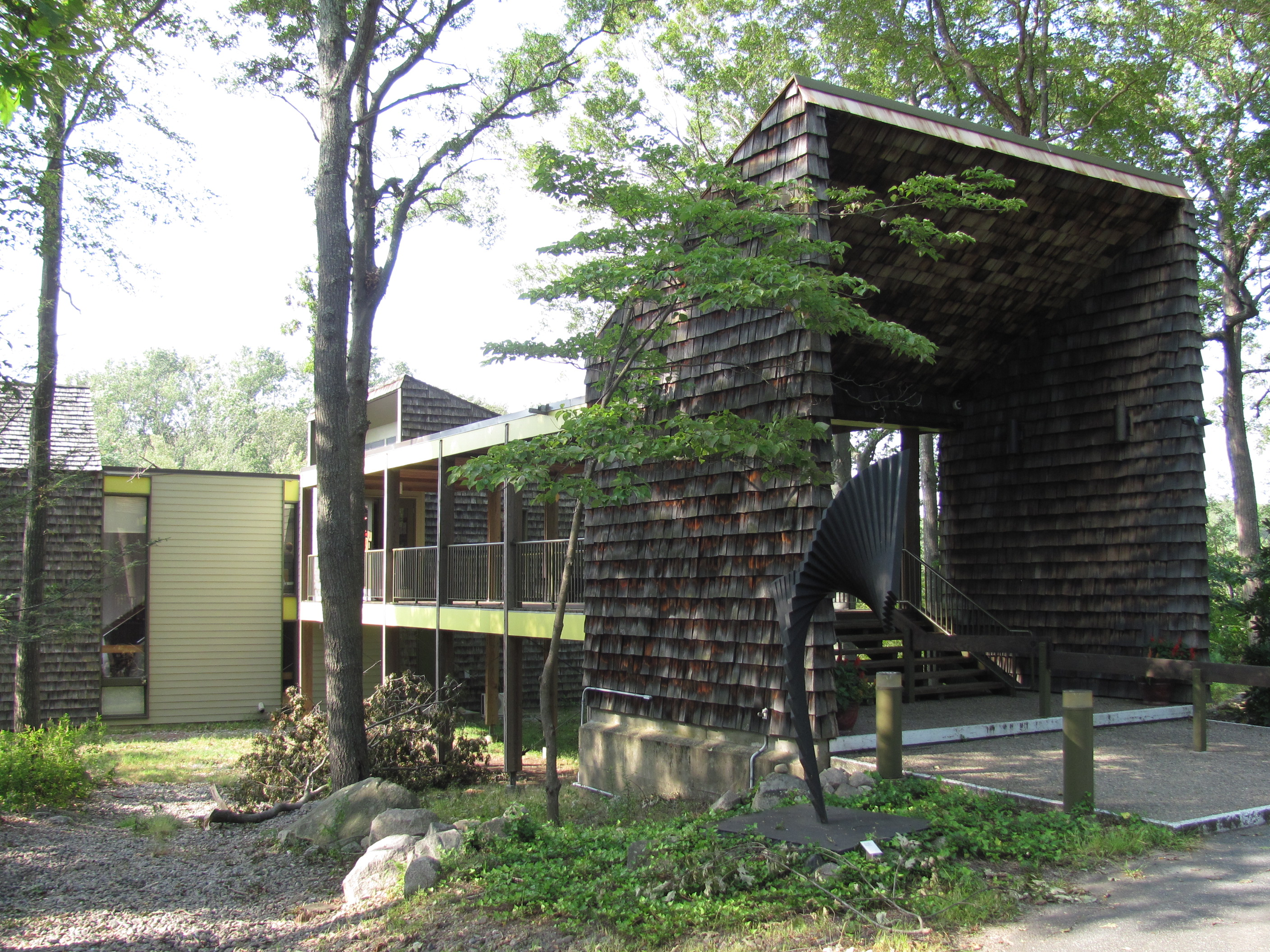

- Location within Massachusetts
- Former name: Brockton Art Center-Fuller Memorial, Fuller Museum of Art
- Established: 1946 (founded); January 1969 (opened)
- Location: Brockton, Massachusetts
- Type: Contemporary craft museum
- Directors: Jennifer Chrzanowski, Executive Director
- Website: www.fullercraft.org

Fuller Craft Museum is a contemporary craft museum located in Brockton, Massachusetts, approximately 25 miles south of Boston. Established through a gift from Brockton native Myron Leslie Fuller in 1946, the Museum opened to the public in 1969 and adopted its contemporary craft focus in 2004.

The Museum presents rotating exhibitions and maintains a permanent collection of contemporary craft, including ceramics, glass, fiber, wood, metal, jewelry and mixed media. It also offers educational programs, artist talks, workshops, and community exhibitions. Admission is free or pay-what-you-can.

== Exhibitions ==
Fuller Craft Museum presents rotating exhibitions that explore contemporary craft through a range of materials, techniques, and artistic perspectives. Exhibitions feature established and emerging artists working in ceramics, glass, fiber, wood, metal, jewelry, and mixed media, highlighting both traditional craftsmanship and experimental approaches to making.

The Museum's exhibition program includes solo and group exhibitions, immersive installations, and presentations drawn from its permanent collection. Exhibitions explore themes such as cultural identity, history, community, sustainability, and the relationship between craft and contemporary life.

== History ==
Fuller Craft Museum traces its origins to Myron Leslie Fuller (1873–1957), a Brockton native and internationally recognized geologist and hydrologist. Fuller established a trust to create an educational art institution in memory of his family, stipulating that it should be of the greatest possible benefit to the community.

The Brockton Art Center-Fuller Memorial opened to the public in January 1969. Originally established as a general art museum and educational center, the institution became an important regional resource for visual arts and arts education in southeastern Massachusetts. On its twentieth anniversary in 1989, it was renamed the Fuller Museum of Art.

In 2001, the Museum began transitioning its focus toward contemporary craft. This shift was formalized in 2004, when the institution adopted the name Fuller Craft Museum and dedicated its mission to contemporary craft, including ceramics, glass, fiber, metal, wood, and other media.

== Permanent Collection ==
Fuller Craft Museum maintains a permanent collection of contemporary craft, including ceramics, glass, fiber, wood, metal, jewelry, and mixed media. The collection includes both functional and sculptural works, representing a range of materials, techniques, and artistic approaches.

The Museum began acquiring artwork before opening to the public, with Elbert Weinberg's Salome becoming its first accession in 1968. Works from the collection are presented through rotating exhibitions and installations.

== Education and Community Engagement ==
Fuller Craft Museum offers educational programs and community initiatives designed to encourage engagement with contemporary craft. Programming includes guided museum tours, hands-on workshops, artist talks, demonstrations, and classes for children and adults. Classes introduce participants to a variety of craft techniques and materials, including ceramics, fiber arts, woodworking, printmaking, and mixed media.

The Museum works with Brockton Public Schools and other educational and community organizations to provide arts learning opportunities for students of different ages and backgrounds. Its annual Brockton Youth Creates exhibition showcases artwork by Brockton Public Schools students, providing opportunities for young artists to exhibit their work in a museum setting.

== Architecture and Grounds ==
Fuller Craft Museum is located at 455 Oak Street in Brockton, Massachusetts, adjacent to D.W. Field Park. The Museum opened at its present location in January 1969, on a wooded property overlooking Upper Porter Pond.

The building was designed by J. Timothy Anderson & Associates, with Doris Cole serving as lead architect and project manager. Construction began November 20, 1967. The original building measured approximately 20,000 square feet, and the site encompasses approximately 19 acres. Its design was influenced by the Louisiana Museum of Modern Art in Denmark.

The Museum features high ceilings, exposed wood beams, slate floors, and floor-to-ceiling windows that provide natural light and views of the surrounding landscape. Galleries connect with outdoor courtyards and sculpture areas, creating a relationship between the artwork, architecture, and natural environment.
