= National Coast Guard Museum =

Coordinates: 41.3545°N 72.0922°W

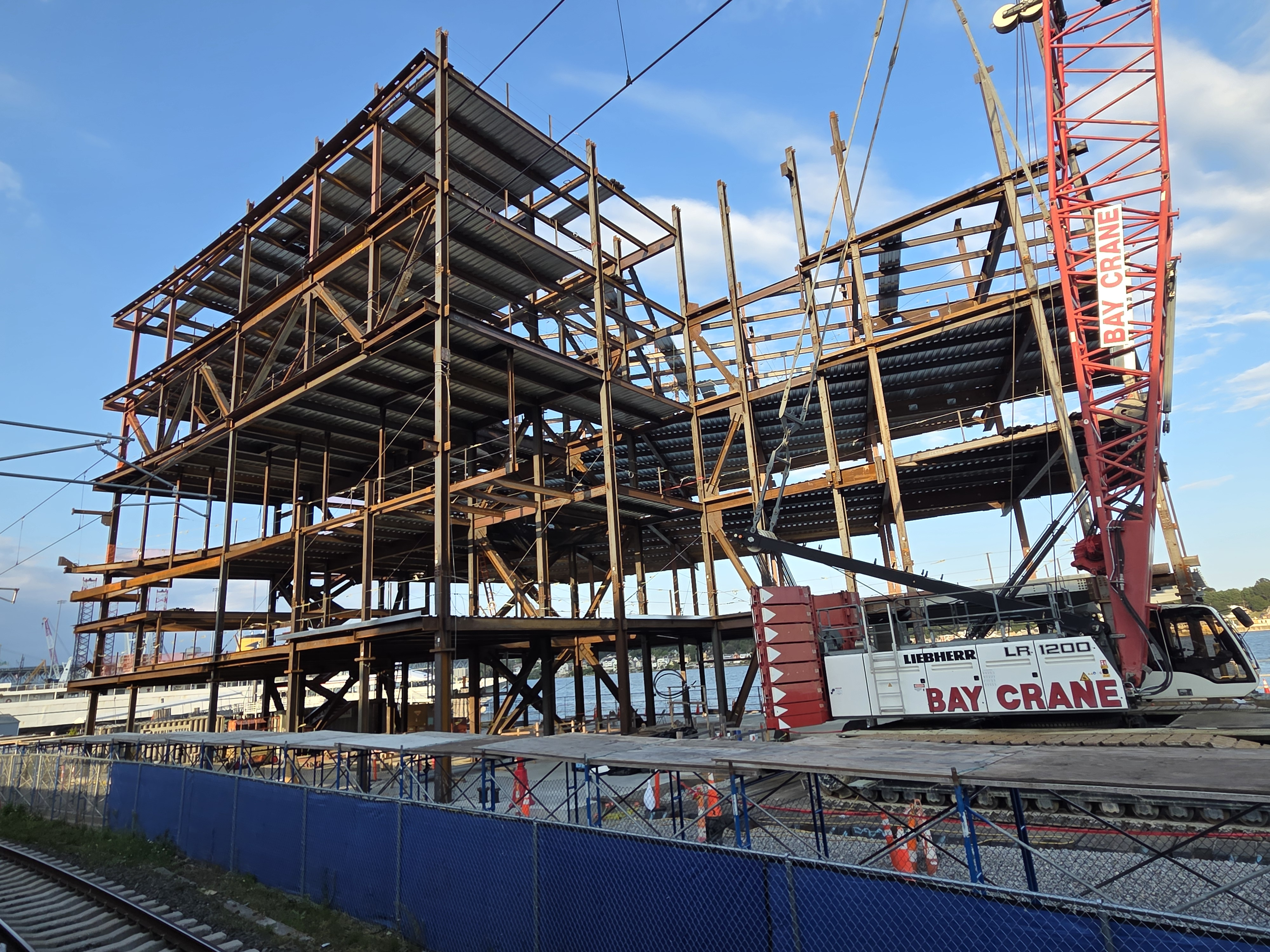
The museum under construction in September 2025

The National Coast Guard Museum is a Museum currently under construction in New London, Connecticut, an historic seaport at the mouth of the Thames River on Long Island Sound and home to the United States Coast Guard Academy. The Museum is scheduled to open August 4, 2027.

The Museum will feature ‘more than 600 artifacts and 5,000 images, including STEM-based educational programs for schools and colleges’. It will also become home to the U.S. Coast Guard ship, Barque Eagle, when not at sea, and will be free to the public. The National Coast Guard Museum is expected to include over 200 galleries and exhibits, attracting an estimated 300,000 visitors annually.

The City of New London provided a site along the Thames River for the Museum. The five or six-story, 80,000 square feet building will include an outdoor concert pavilion where the United States Coast Guard Band and other groups can give concerts. The Coast Guard and the Space Force are the only two out of America's six service branches that do not yet have a dedicated museum; the Army, Marines, Navy and Air Force already have museums.

== History ==
The National Coast Guard Museum Association, which has been working to create the museum since 2001, had hoped to break ground on the building in 2018. Construction of the museum officially started August 19, 2022 with a "keel laying ceremony". By late 2024, the museum association had received $50 million in federal funding and raised $49 million of a $50 million goal. The state has pledged $20 million toward construction of a pedestrian bridge that will link the waterfront and the museum with the Water Street parking garage. The main construction of the museum began in 2025, with completion then expected in 2026. As of August 2026, the museum is expected to open on August 4, 2027.
