= Metro-North Railroad rolling stock =

List of Metro-North rolling stock

The Metro-North Railroad is a commuter railroad serving northern suburbs of New York City. It principally uses a fleet of electric railcars for its services; diesel locomotives and push-pull coaches are in use as well for non-electrified portions of the system.

== History ==
When the Metropolitan Transportation Authority began to subsidize commuter rail systems of Penn Central Railroad and Erie Lackawanna Railway in the early-1970s, they inherited equipment of the former New York Central Railroad, Pennsylvania Railroad, New York, New Haven, and Hartford Railroad and Erie-Lackawanna Railroad, some of which dated back to the early 20th Century. However, they also began to operate variations of the new M1 railcar which was designated as the "M1A." The next new fleet of EMUs came with the M2s, which replaced Pullman 4400-series cars dating back to the early 1920s to 1954 from 1973 to 1977. With the expansion of electrified territory, 142 M3As were ordered, arriving between 1984 and 1986. Two additional small orders would supplement the existing fleet; 54 M4s arrived in late 1987, and in 1994 48 M6s arrived. Many diesel locomotives inherited from those railroads, however, were used as recently as the early 21st Century. The M1As were replaced between 2004 and 2007 with the arrival of the 336 M7As. In order to replace the M2, M4, and M6s on the New Haven Line and to respond to increasing ridership on that line 405 M8s were ordered. In 2016, in response to ridership higher than initially expected on the New Haven Line, up to 94 additional M8s will be built to meet that line's needs.

== Active rolling stock ==
=== Locomotives ===
Builder and model	Photo	Build year	Year rebuilt	Fleet numbers	Power	Notes
EMD GP35R		1964–1965	1991–1992; 2013–2017, 2019	101–108 (8 units)	2,500 horsepower (1,900 kW)	Work locomotive only; Rebuilt by Brookville Equipment
EMD GP40FH-2M		1966–1970	1992–1993; 2007	4900–4905 (6 units)	3,000 horsepower (2,200 kW)	Operated by NJ Transit for West of Hudson services
EMD GP40PH-2M		1968	1992; 2007	4906 (1 unit)	3,000 horsepower (2,200 kW)	Operated by NJ Transit for West of Hudson services
EMD F40PH-3C		1976–1981	2009–2010	4907–4914 (8 units)	3,000 horsepower (2,200 kW)	Operated by NJ Transit for West of Hudson services
GE P32AC-DM		1995–2001	2012–2015	201–220, 222–224, 226–231, 250 (30 units)	3,200 horsepower (2,400 kW)	Dual mode for operation into Grand Central Terminal; Being replaced by Siemens SC-42DM; 228–231 are owned by ConnDOT; 225 renumbered to 250 for America 250 livery
Brookville BL20GH		2008	2017–2026	110–115, 125–130 (12 units)	2,250 horsepower (1,680 kW)	Used on branch line shuttles and work trains; All rebuilt as BL20GHM; 125–130 are owned by ConnDOT
Brookville BL14CG		2009	–	401–402 (2 units)	2,000 horsepower (1,500 kW)	Used on work trains for East Side Access project.; Replaced GP8 and GP9.
Siemens SC-42DM Charger		2024–	–	301–333 (7 units delivered)	4,200 horsepower (3,100 kW)	Dual Mode operation for 3rd rail when available; To replace existing P32AC-DM units; 328–333 owned by ConnDOT
EMD GP40-3H		1971	2017–2019	6699 (1 unit)	3,000 horsepower (2,200 kW)	Leased from CT Rail until the remaining BL20GHs are rebuilt.; Limited to branch line shuttle service

=== Future locomotives ===
Builder and model	Image	Build year	Fleet numbers	Power	Notes
Dual mode Siemens Charger		2025–2027	(16 units)	--	Battery operation for Penn Station Access

In December 2020, the Metro-North board approved a Federal Transit Administration funded $334.9 million contract for Siemens to manufacture and test 19 dual-mode locomotives with an option for an additional eight more. 19 of the 27 dual-mode Locomotives ordered have already been fully approved for $231.6 million with the other eight at a cost of $82.1 million. In addition, the contract also included capital spare parts for $12.9 million, a training simulator for $1.5 million, test equipment for $3 million, and extended warranty for $3.6 million. The contract included 144 in total option locomotives with 66 additional locomotives for Long Island Rail Road in an alternate configuration, 32 additional locomotives for Metro-North, 20 for the Connecticut Department of Transportation, and 26 locomotives in an alternate configuration for Amtrak/NYSDOT. These dual modes would be able to work on both Amtrak and Metro-North signal systems and will be able to sustain 110 miles per hour (180 km/h) in service. The first pair of locomotives were delivered in October 2024 and were expected to enter service in early 2025, with deliveries to continue through 2027. On September 22, 2025, Metro-North and Siemens invited press and Governor Hochul and other elected officials on the inaugural run of the SC42-DM from Grand Central to Poughkeepsie marking revenue service for the chargers.

On January 24, 2025, Metro-North solicited a sole source procurement for up to 16 Siemens Charger locomotives from Siemens to operate service on Penn Station Access. The order would be done as an option order to an existing order. In February 2025, the MTA Board will vote on Option 4 for 13 dual-mode Charger locomotives, with an option for two additional locomotives for $304.9 million. These locomotives will be powered using both AC Pantographs to operate under catenary and battery power, which is a modification to Siemens' existing design for Tier 4 diesel-electric dual mode locomotives.

=== Push-pull coaches ===
These cars are non-powered. 6200 series owned by CTDOT, all others owned by Metro-North.

Builder and model	Photo	Build year	Year Rebuilt	Fleet numbers	Number Active	Notes
Bombardier; Comet II		1983, 1987	2009	Cab cars: 6125–6131 odd Trailers: 6134–6149	19	Bathrooms in odd cars. Formerly used for West of Hudson service, transferred in 2009. Not rebuilt until transferred to East of Hudson.
Bombardier; Shoreliner I		1983	1995–1996; 2008–2009	Cab cars: 6101–6109 odd, 6201–6209 odd Trailers: 6150–6160, 6162–6166 even, 6250–6260, 6262–6268 even	39	Bathrooms in odd cars.
Bombardier; Shoreliner II		1987–1988	2008–2009	Cab cars: 6111–6119 odd, 6211–6219 odd, 6223–6229 odd Trailers: 6161–6167 odd, 6168–6174, 6175–6179 odd, 6176–6186 even, 6190, 6230–6240 even, 6270–6278 even	37	Bathrooms in odd cars. 6188 wrecked and retired after 2013 accident at Spuyten Duyvil
Bombardier; Shoreliner III		1991–2002	NA	Cab cars: 6301–6310 Trailers: 6330–6362 ex. 6345, 6364–6374 even	48	Bathrooms in all cabs and odd trailers. 6345 wrecked and retired after 2013 accident at Spuyten Duyvil.
Bombardier; Shoreliner IV		1996–2002	NA	Cab cars: 6221, 6311–6320 Trailers: 6280–6286 even, 6363–6371 odd, 6376–6398 even, 6430–6474 even ex. 6440	54	Bathrooms in all cabs and odd trailers. 6222, 6288, and 6440 wrecked and retired after 2013 accident at Spuyten Duyvil.
Alstom; Comet V		2004	NA	Cab cars: 6700–6714 Trailers: 6750–6799	65	Bathrooms in all cabs and odd trailers. Operated by NJ Transit for West of Hudson service.
Budd club/lounge		1949		1–3	3	Only used on special trains, ex-Lackawanna and New York Central.

=== Future push-pull coaches ===
In August 2023, CTDOT approved a contract with Alstom for 60 single-level passenger cars. The cars will replace the existing Shoreliner coach fleet on the Waterbury Branch and the Danbury Branch, as well as Mafersa coaches and leased MBTA MBB coaches on the Hartford Line. Deliveries are expected to begin in 2026. Metro-North intends to begin replacing the Shoreliners used on other east-of-Hudson services by 2029.

In February 2025, the MTA Board will vote on a proposal to use a request for proposals (RFP) instead of competitive bidding to procure coach cars to be used for PSA to ensure full fleet availability and to replace Metro-North's Shoreliner Center-Door and End-Door coach cars.

=== Electric multiple units ===
M3A and M7A cars draw power from 650 V DC third rail with under-running contact shoes. M8 draw power from third rail, both over- and under-running, or 12.5 kV 60 Hz and 25 kV 60 Hz AC catenary.

Builder and model	Photo	Build year	Year rebuilt	Fleet numbers	Number Active	Notes
Budd; M3A		1983–1985	2008–2015	8000–8141	140	
Bombardier; M7A		2004–2006	N/A	4000–4335	334	4333 burned and destroyed in 2015 Valhalla train crash.
Kawasaki; M8		2009–2022	N/A	Unpowered single cars: 9460–9476 even, 9560–9590 even Married pairs: 9100–9421, 9500–9519, 9600–9623, 9700–9738	471	The order of 60 additional cars, and 34 additional cars with an option order was announced in 2016; Replaced all M2/M4/M6s; Shared with ConnDOT for use on Shore Line East services

==== Future electric multiple units ====
Builder and model	Photo	Build year	Year rebuilt	Fleet numbers	Notes
Alstom; M9A		2029–2031	N/A	156 cars 242 options available	To replace M3As

MTA originally planned to order 188 M9A cars for Metro-North as part of the 2015–2019 Capital Program. In June 2018, Metro-North announced that they would elect to not exercise their options for the M9 order, instead overhauling their M3A units to extend their lifespan. However, that November, Metro-North stated that they "are working with LIRR to procure 170 new M9A cars in the next Capital Program to provide additional capacity and replace M3As." As of 2024, Metro-North intends to replace all M3A cars by 2029. In June 2025 NY Governor Kathy Hochul announced plans to purchase 316 M9A which was then signed and executed in July 2025. The contract includes options for 242 more that can be executed.

== Retired rolling stock ==
Roster rolling stock manufactured from 1946 to the present.

Builder and model	Photo	Built	Retired	Heritage	Successor	Power	Notes
Locomotives
Brookville; BL06		2000	2012	Metro-North	BL20GH	600 HP	Used as a yard switcher
EMD FP10		1946–1949 (rebuilt in late 1970s)	2008	GM&O; MBTA	P32AC-DM, BL20GH	1750 hp	Original Gulf Mobile & Ohio F3s, later MBTA; rebuilt F3s. 412 in service at Adirondack Scenic Railroad as 1502; 413 is preserved at The Danbury Railway Museum.
EMD GP9		1956	2009	New York Central	Brookville BL14CG	1400 hp	Work Locomotive; 750 is stored at Croton-Harmon
EMD GP8		1957	2010	New York Central	Brookville BL14CG	1750 hp	Work Locomotive only. 543 is used during the winter to melt ice off the third rail. Reactivated for switcher service in 2012 after retirement 2010. At Croton-Harmon retired; in long term storage
ALCO RS-3m		1956	1990s	New York, New Haven and Hartford Railroad		1200 hp	Preserved at Danbury Railway Museum
EMD FL9		1956–1959	1998–2002, 2009	New York, New Haven and Hartford; Penn Central; Conrail	P32AC-DM, BL20GH, Amtrak P40DC	1800 hp	Dual-mode locomotive with third rail shoe for running in Park Ave Tunnel - in later years was relegated to 100% diesel work on branch lines. Several have been donated to railroad museums.
GE B23-7		1976	1993	Conrail	GP35R	2250 hp	Work Locomotive; ex-Conrail. Traded Back to GE on expiration of lease for the GP35Rs.
GE U34CH		1978	1994	Erie Lackawanna	GP40PH-2	3600 hp	Used for the Port Jervis Line. Rebuilt Chicago and North Western U30C; Scrapped in 1994
Republic Locomotive FL9AC		1992	2005	New York New Haven and Hartford; LIRR	P32AC-DM	3000 hp	Ex. LIRR; rebuilt EMD FL9s. All were withdrawn from service and scrapped in 2005.
GE P40DC		1993	2009	Amtrak	BL20GH	4000 hp	Amtrak-leased units to replace FL9s. Retained Amtrak paint and logo. Were used on Danbury, Waterbury and Wassaic branch lines. Amtrak 833, 834, 836, 838, 840, 841, 842, and 843. When Metro-North returned these units, they were sold to CTDOT for Shore Line East. All were rebuilt and are now used on Hartford Line.
GE P32AC-DM		2001	2026	Metro-North	None	3200 hp	221 purchased by the Adirondack Railroad in 2026. First Genesis locomotive preserved.
Self-Propelled Cars
Budd RDC		1950–1956	1991	New York Central; New York New Haven and Hartford	P32AC-DM; Shoreliner coaches	550 hp	Used on Port Jervis Line and Waterbury Branch. New Haven 32 and 47 are at Danbury Railway Museum; 47 was stripped for parts for 32. 32 is operational. Metro-North demotored certain units for push pull coaches
Pullman 4400		1954	1983	New York, New Haven and Hartford	Budd M2s	650 V DC Third Rail under running 11 kV 25 Hz AC catenary	Ex-New Haven Railroad; ran on New Haven Line; 3 units are at Danbury Railway Museum (One owned by private individual); Replaced by M2s
Pullman ACMU		1962–1965	2004	New York Central	Bombardier M7As	650 V DC third rail under-running	Ex-New York Central; electrical multiple units; replaced by M7As. 1128 and 1171 are at Danbury Railway Museum.
Budd SPV-2000		1978–1981	1996	Amtrak/ConnDOT, MTA	P32AC-DM; Shoreliner coaches	550 hp	Owned by MTA and ConnDOT (CTDOT units had Amtrak logos in addition to State of CT seal.) Used on branch lines of Metro-North and Amtrak's Springfield line. CTDOT de-powered their units for Shore Line East. Those have since been retired in favor of Ex-VRE Mafersa push-pull coaches. MNCR 293 is preserved at Connecticut Eastern Railroad Museum in Willimantic, CT. Several ConnDOT-owned de-powered units were sent to New Orleans for hurricane-standby duty.
Budd M1A		1971–1973	2009	Penn Central	Bombardier M7As	650 V DC third rail under-running	Replaced by M7As
Budd M2		1972–1977, rebuilt 1992–1994, 2006	2018	Penn Central	Kawasaki M8s	650 V DC third rail under-running & 12.5 kV 60 Hz AC catenary	Largely replaced by M8s in 2015, all replaced in 2018. Pair 8706–8707 has been preserved by the Danbury Railway Museum.
Tokyu Car M4		1987–1988	2015	Metro-North/ ConnDOT	Kawasaki M8s	650 V DC third rail under-running & 12.5 kV 60 Hz AC catenary	Replaced by M8s, last run of M4/M6 equipment June 26, 2015.
Morrison-Knudsen M6		1994	2015	Metro-North/ ConnDOT	Kawasaki M8s	650 V DC third rail under-running & 12.5 kV 60 Hz AC catenary	Replaced by M8s, last run of M4/M6 equipment June 26, 2015, last new build DC traction railcars in North America
Coaches
Various stainless-steel coaches and club cars		Various years	1985	New York New Haven and Hartford, New York Central	Shoreliner I and II Cars	Non-Powered	Disposed of or sold through the 1980s as new equipment came on line.
Pullman Standard 4800 series coaches		1950s	1985	SEMTA	Shoreliner I and II Cars	Non-Powered	Detroit's commuter carrier.
Morrison-Knudsen Boise Budds		1982	1998		Shoreliner III cars	Non-Powered	Rebuilt Budd RDCs that had their Engines Removed and used as Push-Pull cars; Original MBTA then sold to VRE in 1986 then VRE sold them to Metro-North. 2 units sit on a deadline in Croton-Harmon; Rest sold to Caltrain in 2000, and are now used by the Grand Canyon Railway since 2005.
GE/Avco/Vickers Comet IA		1978	2005	Metro North	Alstom Comet V	Non-Powered	Two cabs and eight trailers were built from surplus shells from the Arrow III EMU for NJDOT. They saw use primarily on the Port Jervis Line. Replaced by Comet V cars.
Bombardier Comet III		1991	1998, 2008	New Jersey Transit	Alstom Comet V	Non-Powered	Sold to NJT in 1998, sold back to Metro-North in 2008. Now converted for use on LaserTrain.

=== Bar cars ===
Metro-North Railroad was the last commuter railroad in the United States to operate bar cars – electric MUs equipped with bars that served alcohol. The last train which included a bar car operated on May 9, 2014. On September 13, 2016, Connecticut Governor Dannel Malloy announced that the state would be buying another 60 M8 cars, 10 being "bar cars". However, the idea was abandoned due to cost and train capacity concerns, as well as Metro-North not being willing to handle the bar themselves, wishing for an outside company to run the operation itself.
