= CT Rail =

Commuter rail service in Connecticut, US

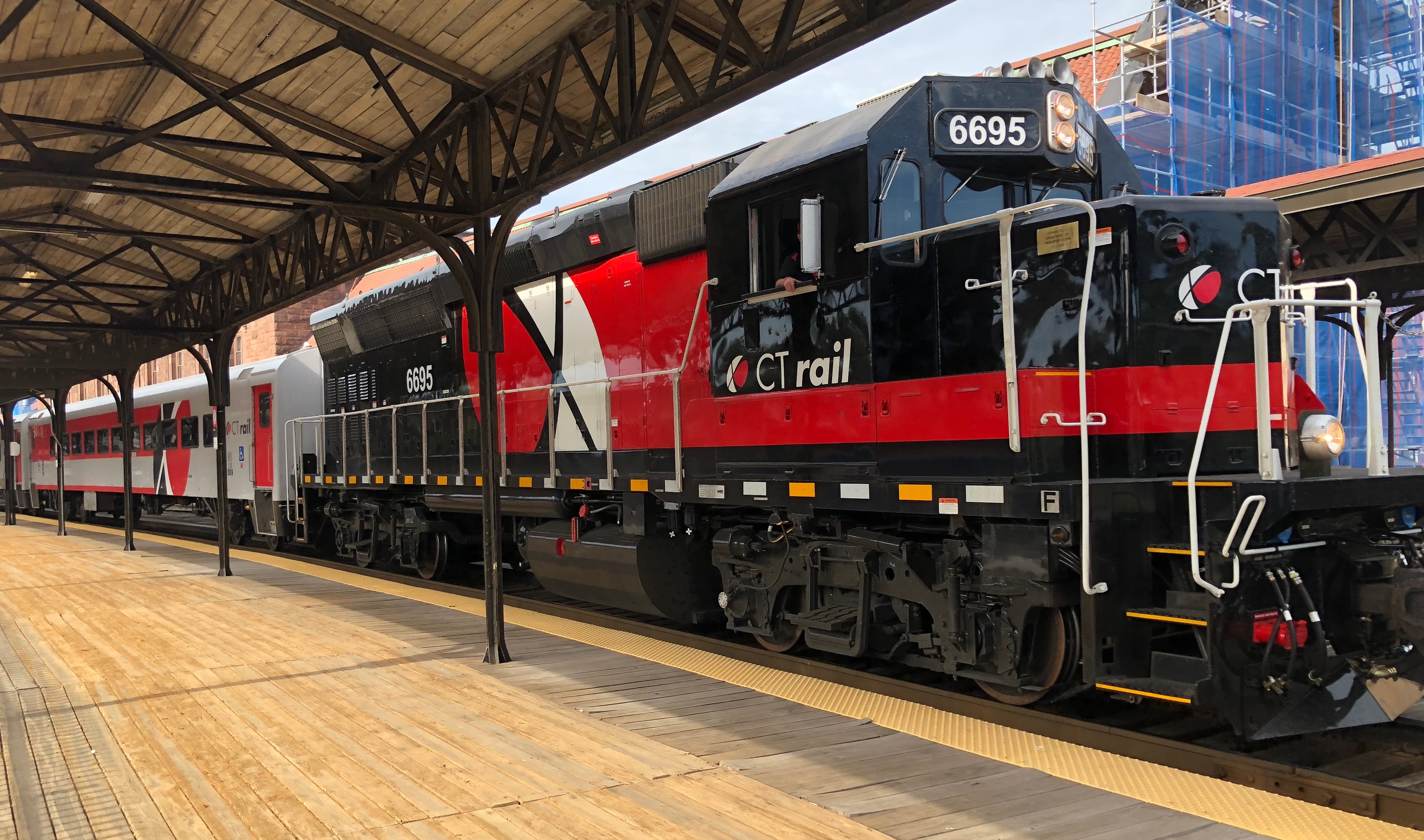
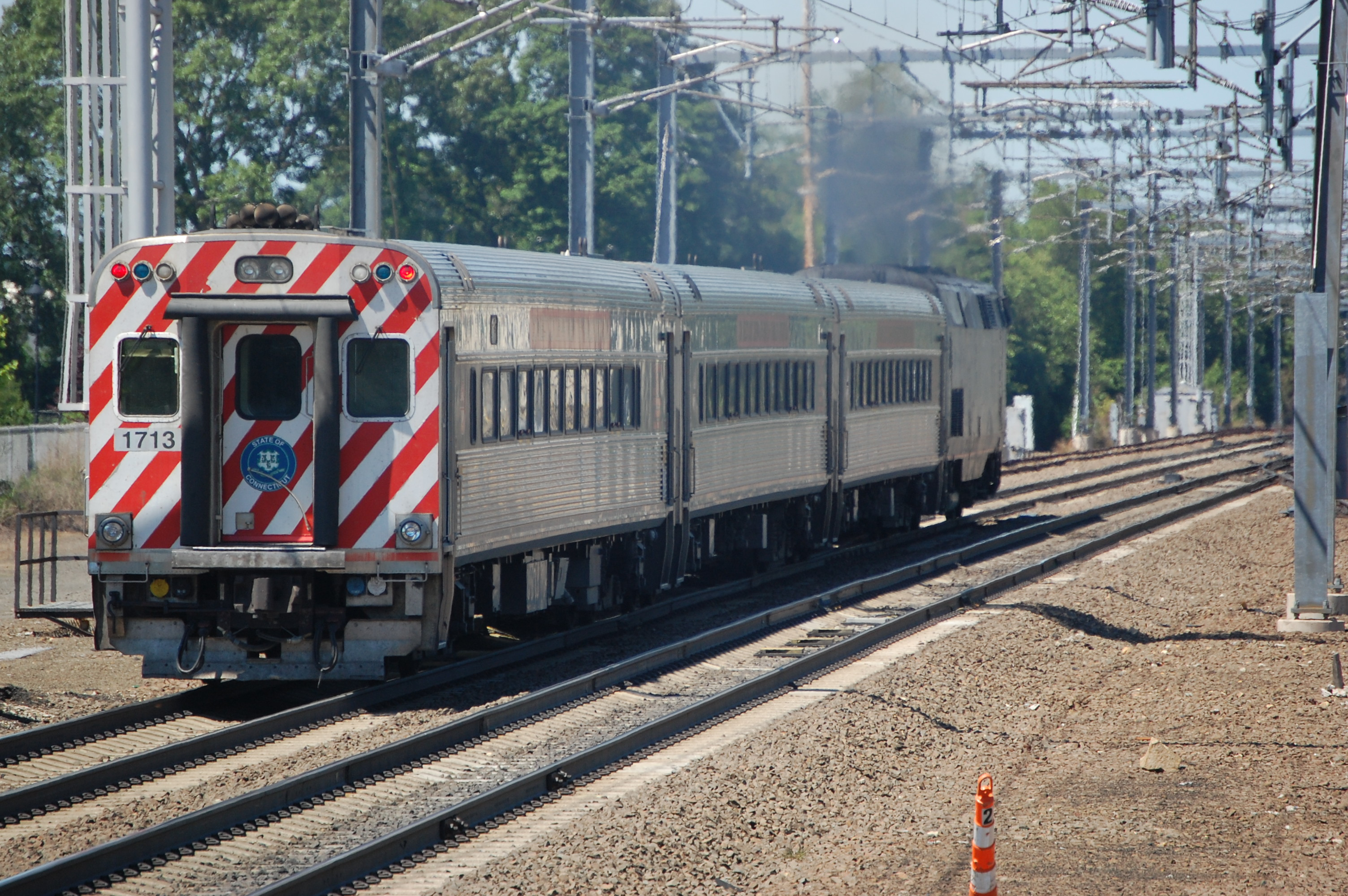
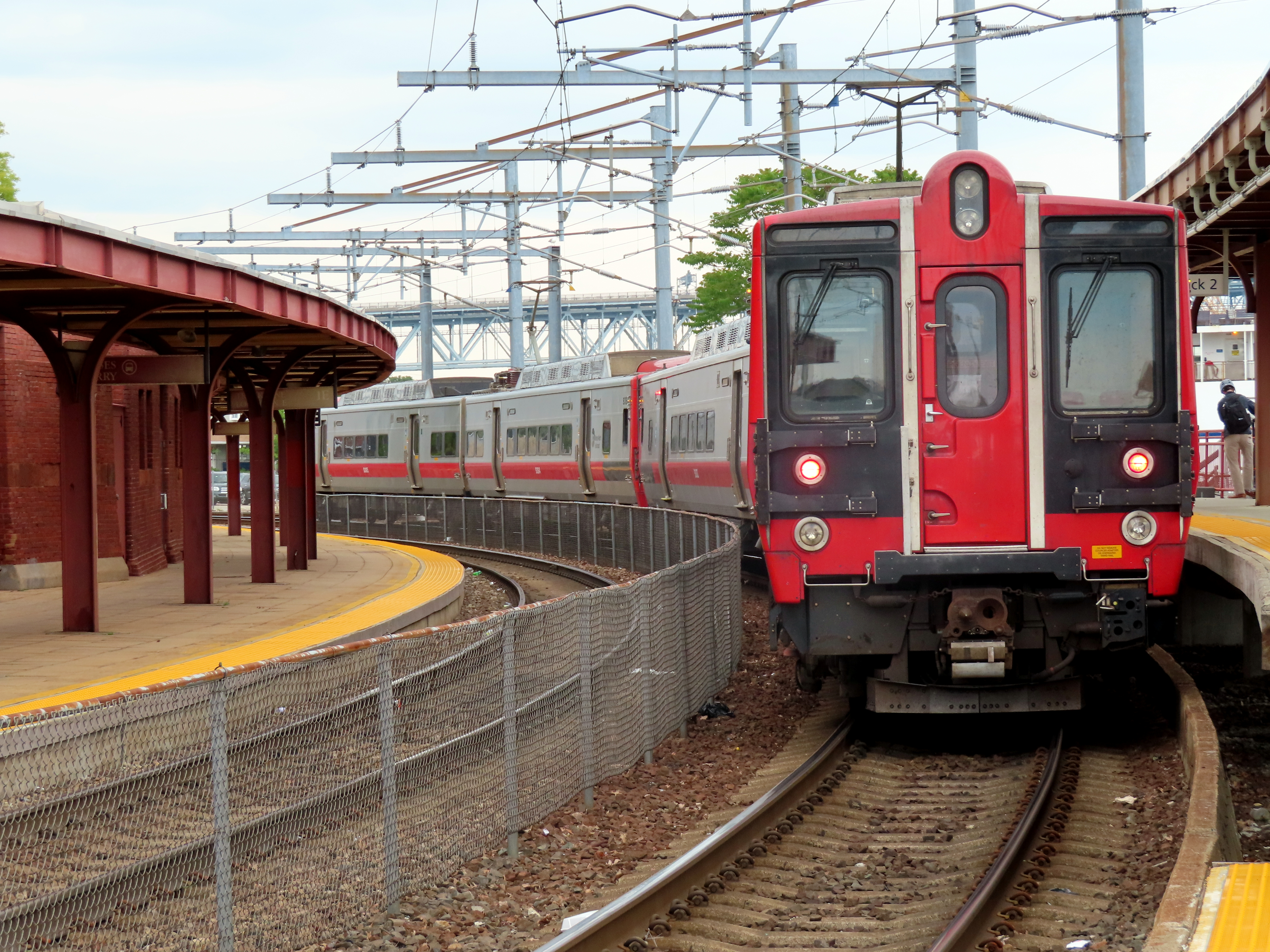
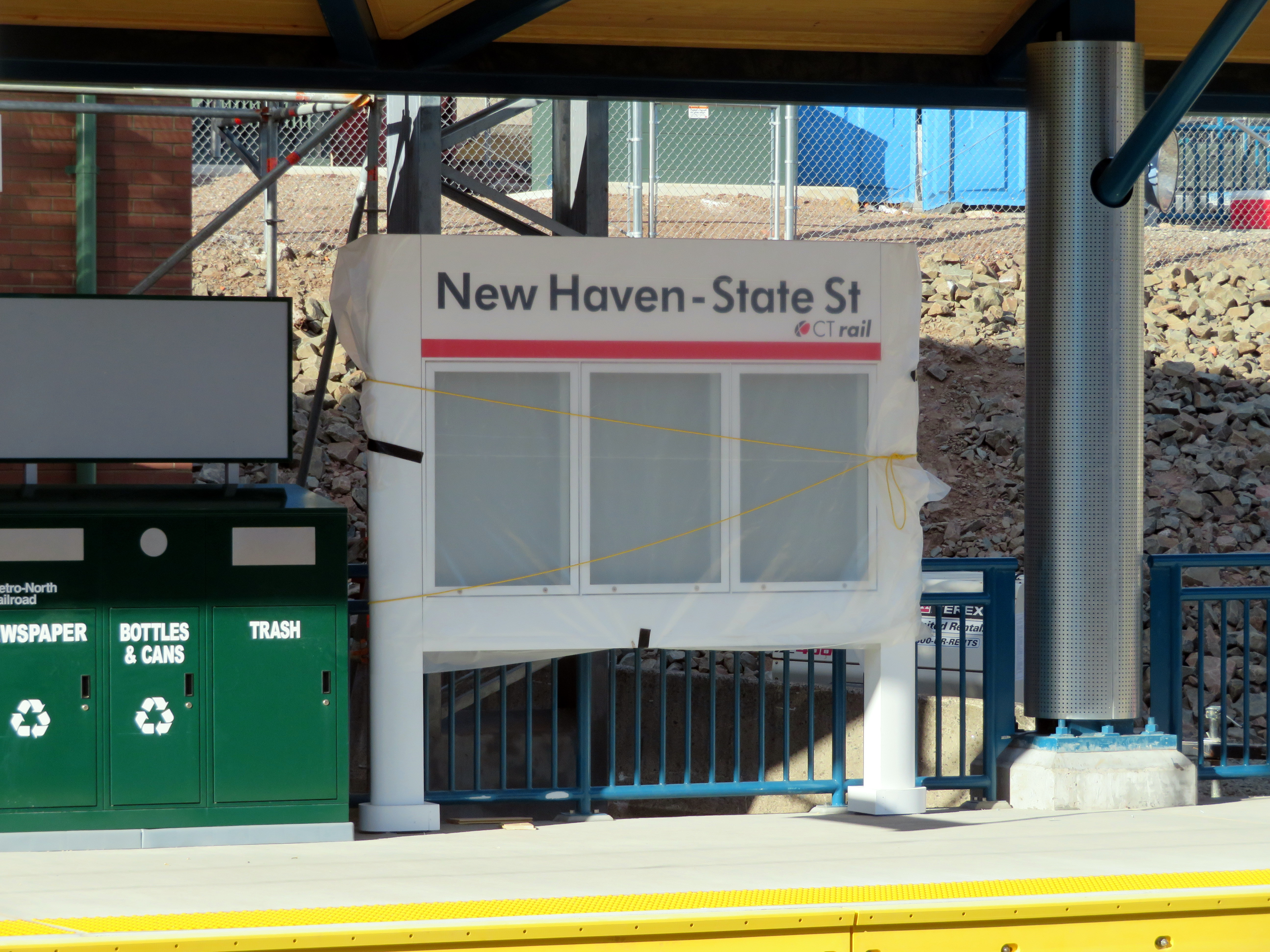
- From top-left: GP40-3H at Hartford, Mafersa coaches at Old Saybrook, Kawasaki M8 at New London, and signage at State Street station

Overview
- Owner: Connecticut Department of Transportation (CTDOT)
- Locale: Connecticut and Western Massachusetts
- Transit type: Commuter rail
- Number of lines: 2
- Number of stations: 22
- Daily ridership: 4,255 (2019)
- Annual ridership: 1,410,500 (2019)
- Website: ctrail.com

Operation
- Began operation: 1990
- Operators: TransitAmerica Services and Alternate Concepts (Hartford Line); Amtrak (Shore Line East)
- Reporting marks: CNDX

Technical
- System length: 121 miles (195 km)
- Track gauge: 4 ft 8 1/2 in (1,435 mm) standard gauge
System map

CT Rail, stylized as CTrail, is the brand for commuter rail services overseen by the Connecticut Department of Transportation (CTDOT), in the U.S. state of Connecticut, with services on the Hartford Line extending into Massachusetts. CTDOT oversees two lines: Shore Line East, between New Haven and New London, Connecticut, and the Hartford Line, from New Haven, through Hartford, to Springfield, Massachusetts.

Services are operated under contract, with Shore Line East operated by Amtrak along the Northeast Corridor, and the Hartford Line operated by a joint venture of TransitAmerica Services and Alternate Concepts. CT Rail trains, along with other CTDOT rail operations, use the reporting mark CNDX.

== Lines ==
CT Rail operates two commuter rail lines: the Hartford Line and Shore Line East. Both lines utilize portions of the Northeast Corridor, with trains terminating at Union Station in New Haven.

=== Hartford Line ===
The Hartford Line runs between New Haven Union Station in New Haven, Connecticut and Springfield Union Station in Springfield, Massachusetts, running through Hartford, Connecticut. Ten CT Rail round trips operate on weekdays, and six on weekends. This service is supplemented by eight additional roundtrips run by the Amtrak Hartford Line, which operates along the same route. CT Rail Hartford Line tickets are accepted on the Amtrak Hartford Line, and vice versa; however, the Vermonter inter-city service does not participate despite running along the same route. This line is a joint venture between the Connecticut Department of Transportation and the Massachusetts Department of Transportation (MassDOT). The line is not electrified and is a mostly double track route that uses diesel locomotives. Service began on June 16, 2018. The majority of the Hartford Line's route is along the New Haven–Springfield Line, with two stations in New Haven, Union Station and State Street, being on the Northeast Corridor.

=== Shore Line East ===
CT Rail's Shore Line East commuter rail service runs between New London and New Haven. Ten round trips operate on weekdays, and eight on weekends. Limited weekday service extends along Metro North's New Haven Line to Stamford. When service initially started along the line on May 29, 1990, Shore Line East commuter trains were intended to be a temporary measure in order to reduce congestion along Interstate 95 during a highway construction project. However, the service was made permanent due to more ridership than initially anticipated. Pre-COVID, the line had an average daily ridership of about 2,100 riders. It runs along the Northeast Corridor for its entire length. Although the line is electrified, the service uses diesel locomotives.

== Rolling stock ==
=== Current ===
CT Rail uses the following rolling stock for its commuter rail operations:

Builder	Model	Photo	Active	Road numbers	Year built	Year acquired	Notes
Locomotives
GE	P40DC		12	6700–6711	1993	2005, 2015	Ex-Amtrak and NJ Transit
EMD	GP40-3H		6	6694–6699	1971	1996	
Coaches
Mafersa	Coaches		33	1701–1719 (odd); 1730–1774 (even)	1991–1992	2004	Ex-Virginia Railway Express
Electric Multiple Units
Kawasaki	M8 Railcar		471	9100–9759	2011–2022	2022	Shared with Metro-North; 12 used for Shore Line East

CTDOT also owns several locomotives operated by Metro-North on the New Haven Line and its branches, listed in Metro-North Railroad rolling stock.

=== Future ===
Builder	Model	Photo	Orders	Year built	Year acquired	Notes
Coaches
Alstom	Alstom Adessia		60	2026–	2026 (expected)	To be used for Hartford Line, Danbury Branch, and Waterbury Branch service. Deliveries are expected to start in 2026.

In August 2023, CTDOT approved a $315 million contract with Alstom for 60 single-level Adessia passenger cars. The cars will replace the existing coach fleet on the Hartford Line along with the Metro-North Waterbury Branch and Danbury Branch. Deliveries are expected to begin in 2026.

=== Retired ===
Builder	Model	Photo	Road numbers	Year built	Year acquired	Year retired	Notes
Locomotives
EMD	F7		6690-6691	1953	1990	Late 1990s	Ex-PATrain. Kept in reserve fleet into the 2000s. To Galveston Railroad Museum as "Santa Fe 315 and 316".
EMD	GP38		253, 257	1966	1991	Late 1990s	Leased, later purchased from Pan Am Railways.
EMD	GP7		471	1950	1991	Late 1990s	Leased, later purchased from Pan Am Railways. Rebuilt by Amtrak in 1994 with an EMD 645 engine. Now operated by the Orrville Railroad Heritage Society since 2000.
Coaches
Pullman Company	Coaches		1600-1606	1950s	1991	Late-1990s	Ex-PATrain.
Pullman Company	Control cars		1680-1682	1950s	1991	Late-1990s	Ex-PATrain.
Bombardier Transportation	Shoreliner III		1614, 1616	1991	1991	2000s	To Metro-North Railroad pool.
Bombardier Transportation	Shoreliner III		1640-1646 (Note: Even numbers only)	1991	1991	2000s	Coaches fitted with head-end power (HEP) generators for use with the GP38s and GP7. To Metro-North Railroad pool.
Bombardier Transportation	Shoreliner III		1691-1697 (Note: Odd numbers only)	1991	1991	2000s	Cab cars, fitted with HEP generators for use with the GP38s and GP7. To Metro-North Railroad pool.
Budd	Constitution Liner (Note: Former Budd SPV-2000 diesel multiple units, converted into coaches.)		1001	1980	1980	2004	Ex-CDOT/Amtrak 997; used as a conference car by Governor John Rowland. To Danbury Railway Museum in 2018.
Budd	Constitution Liner		1621-1633 (Note: Coach cars)	1980	1980	2004	7 cars sold to Foxville and Northern Railroad in 2018, then to Railexco in 2023; five then sold to Tren Interoceánico later in 2023.
Budd	Constitution Liner		1671-1675 (Note: Cab cars)	1980	1980	2004	7 cars sold to Foxville and Northern Railroad in 2018, then to Railexco in 2023; five then sold to Tren Interoceánico later in 2023.
MBB	Coaches		501, 503, 505, 508, 509, 516, 517, 522, 526, 527, 528, 532, 1505, 1509, 1518, 1520	1988	2017–2018	2022	Leased from MBTA.

== See also ==
- Metro-North Railroad
- CT Fastrak
- List of United States commuter rail systems by ridership
