= Comet V =

Class of American commuter railcars

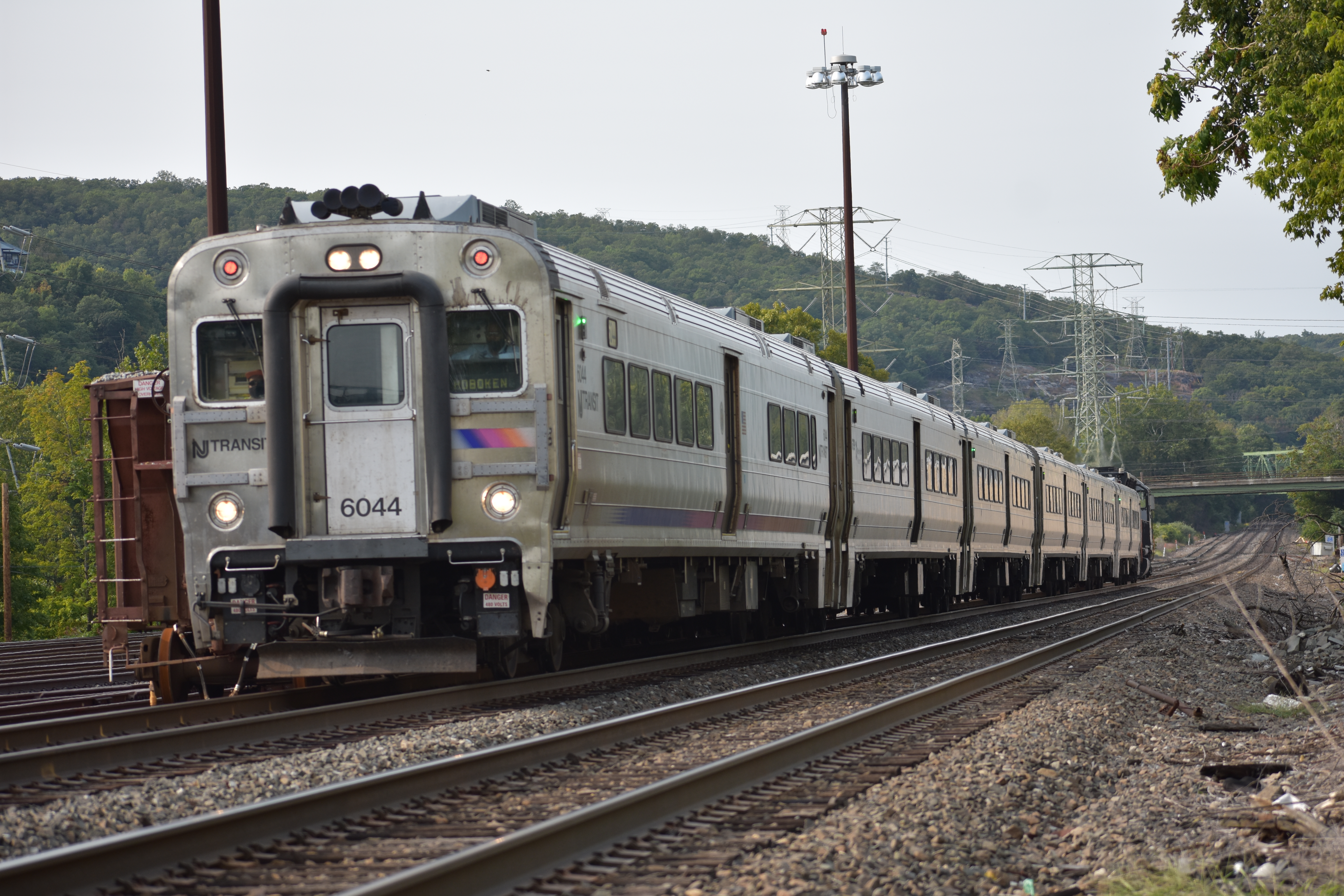
- New Jersey Transit Comet V cab car #6044 leading Hoboken bound train #66, nearing Suffern.

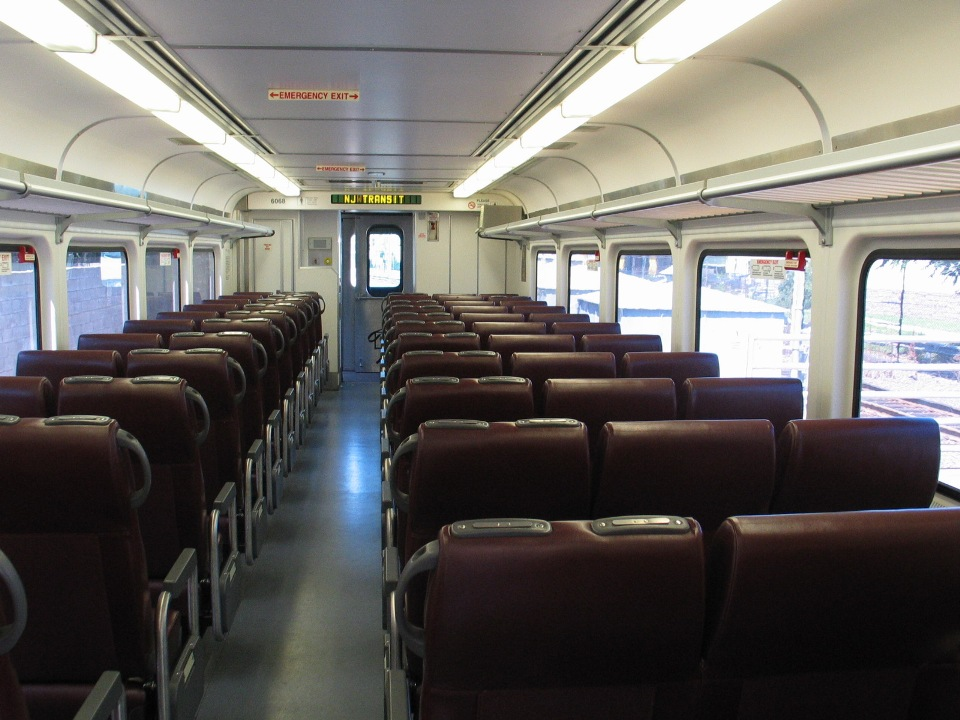
- Interior of a Comet V car.
- In service: 2002–present
- Manufacturer: Alstom
- Family name: Comet
- Constructed: 1999–2004
- Entered service: April 2002
- Number built: 265
- Number in service: 263
- Fleet numbers: 6000–6083, 6700–6714 (cab cars); 6200–6213, 6750–6754 (trailers with lavatories); 6500–6601, 6755–6799 (trailers without lavatories)
- Capacity: 109 (cab); 111 (with lavatory); 117 (without lavatory)
- Operator: New Jersey Transit (65 cars owned by Metro-North Railroad)

Specifications
- Car length: 85 ft (25.9 m)
- Width: 10 ft 6 in (3.20 m)
- Doors: 6 (2 high-level handicap doors and 4 regular, low-level doors.); 5 on cab units (3 high-level handicap doors and 2 regular, low-level doors.)
- Weight: 100,000 lb (45,359 kg)
- Track gauge: 4 ft 8 1/2 in (1,435 mm) standard gauge

The Comet V railcar is the fifth generation of the Comet railcar series. Produced by the manufacturer Alstom, the Comet V is a rather different car compared to previous models in the series. The Comet V has been in use by New York metropolitan area commuter rail operators New Jersey Transit and Metro-North since April 2002.

== Layout and design ==
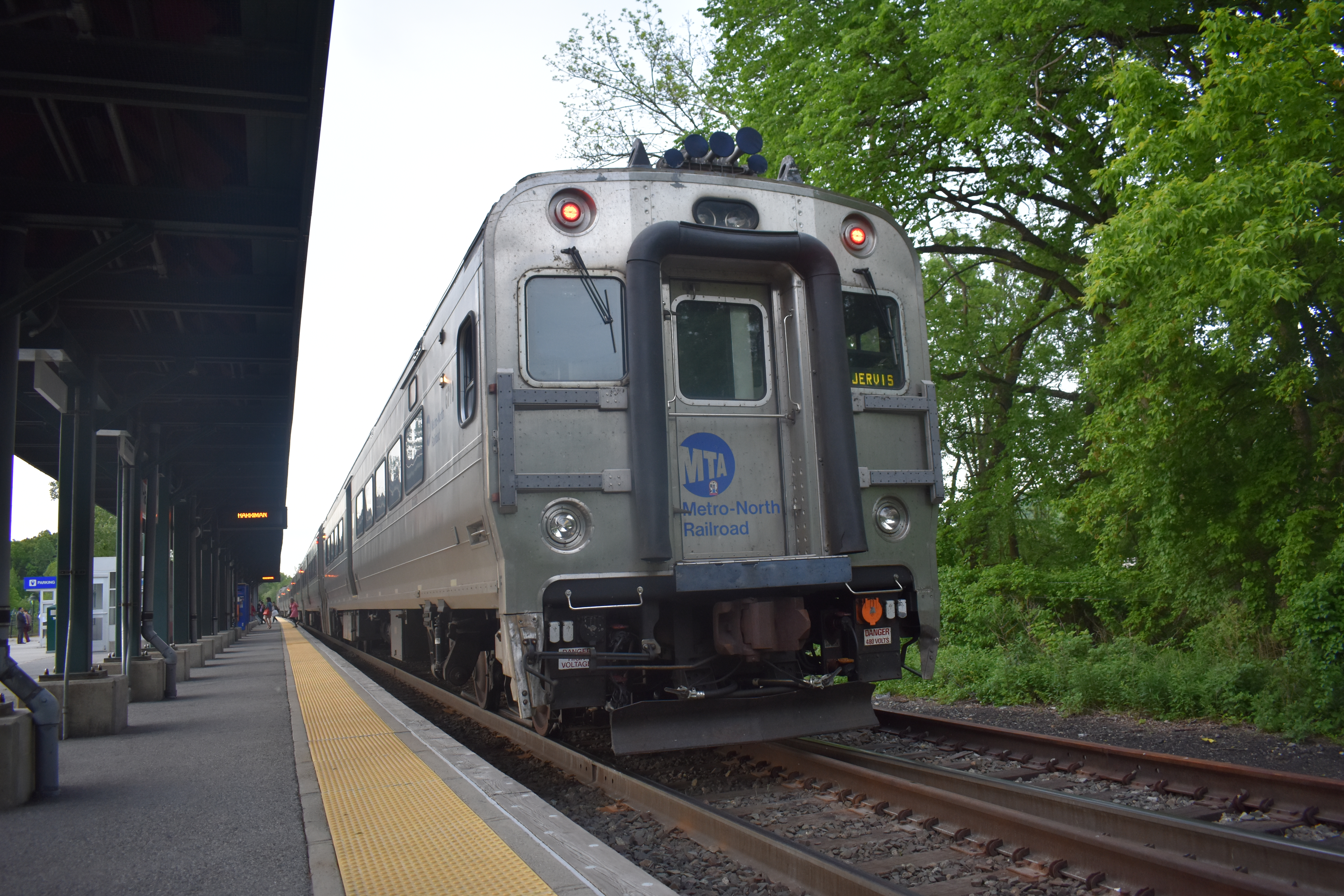
Metro-North Comet V cab car #6710 trails train #61 at Harriman, bound for Port Jervis

The main design of the Comet V is similar to its predecessors starting with the Comet III. Each trailer car has six doors for entering and exiting (like the Comet IV, the cab cars have five doors); the doors at the ends of the car are single-leaf with trap doors for low-level boarding while those in the middle are double-leaf but lack steps and trapdoors, only opening at high platform stations. The length of the cars at 85 feet (25.9 m) over the couplers remains unchanged from previous models and their width adheres to the standard loading gauge of 10.5 feet (3.2 m).

The one unique feature of Comet V cab cars, compared to earlier Comets and especially the Comet IV, is the lack of steps and a trapdoor at the door in the vestibule opposite the engineer's operating position. Therefore, it can only be used for high-platform boarding. Like the Comet IV, the engineer's side of the cab vestibule has no door.

The interiors of the trains have significant differences from previous Comet railcars, featuring redesigned seats and windows that are larger than previous Comet coaches. There are also new LED digital information displays along with slightly more seating. Major external differences include a stainless-steel exterior and visible, roof-mounted air conditioning units.

The Comet V was the inspiration for the Bombardier MultiLevel Coach, which began construction in 2006. Since 2021, Alstom has continued to construct these coaches.

=== Door problems ===
One prominent problem of the Comet V is failures in its door-opening mechanism. On the Comet V, Alstom added a new button to open vestibule doors that lead to the end doors labeled with "push to open." This led to confusion among passengers about how to open the doors; eventually many resorted to opening them manually. The Comet V's software glitches came to light as doors failed to open or malfunctioned.

== Accidents ==
On the morning of September 29, 2016, an NJ Transit train crashed through a bumper block and into the concourse of Hoboken Terminal, killing one person and injuring over 110. Comet V cab car No. 6036 suffered major damage due to falling debris.

On December 19, 2025, cab car 6061 was involved in a head on collision with another train at the Bay Street station on the Montclair-Boonton Line.
