= Budd SPV-2000 =

Self-propelled diesel multiple unit railcar

SPV-2000
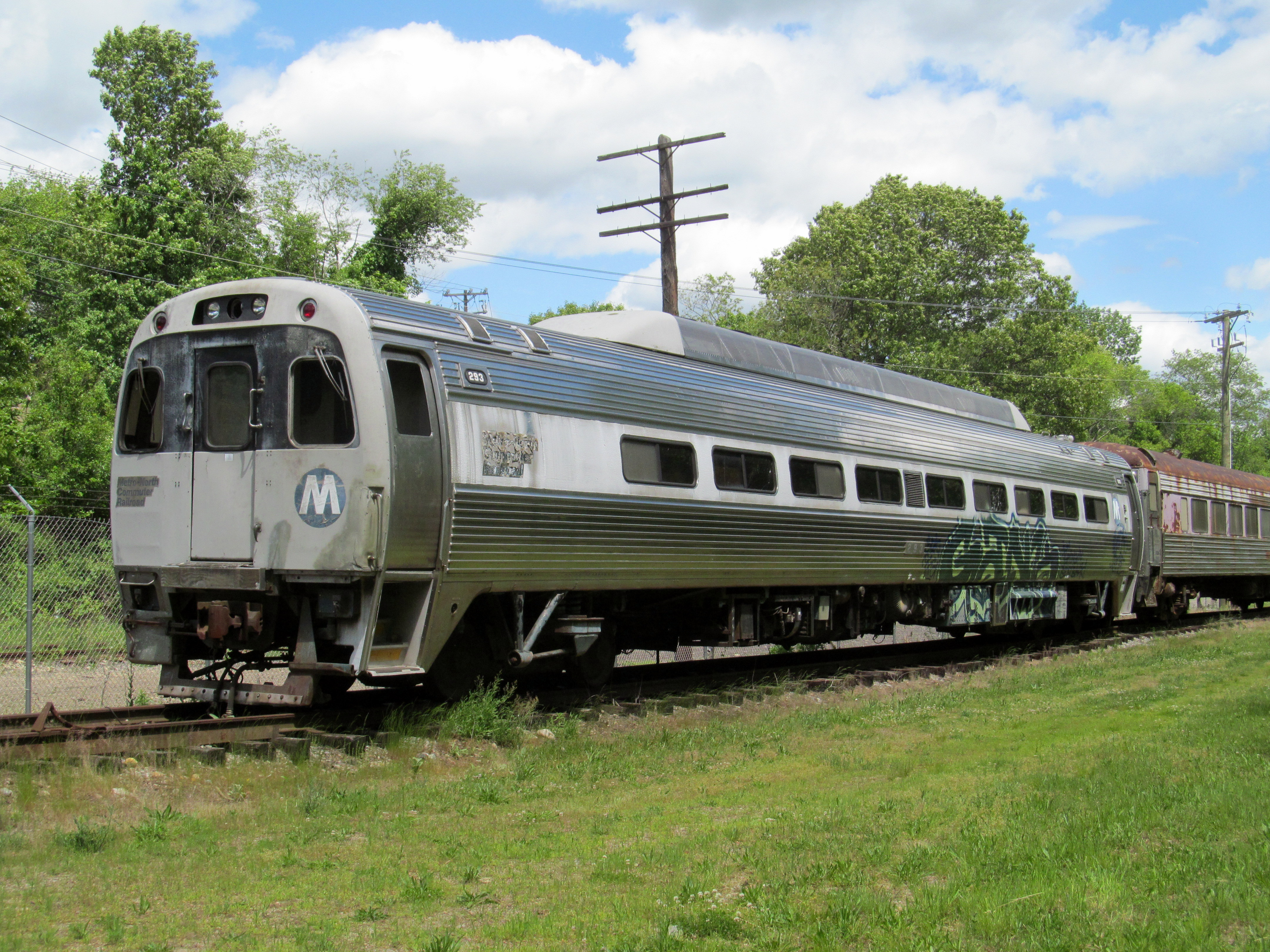
- SPV-2000 No. 293, formerly of Metro-North Railroad, preserved at the Connecticut Eastern Railroad Museum
- Manufacturer: Budd Company
- Constructed: 1978–1981
- Number built: 31 (plus 14 unassembled shells)
- Capacity: 86–109
- Operators: Federal Railroad Administration; ONCF; CDOT/Amtrak; MTA/Metro-North; Caltrain (used as inspection cars)

Specifications
- Car length: 85 feet 4 inches (26.01 m)
- Width: 10 feet 6 inches (3.20 m)
- Height: 14 feet 6 inches (4.42 m)
- Maximum speed: 80 to 120 miles per hour (130 to 190 km/h)
- Weight: 127,000 pounds (58,000 kg)
- UIC classification: B'B' (as built) (1A)(A1) (rebuilt)
- AAR wheel arrangement: B-B (as built); 1A-A1 (rebuilt)
- Track gauge: 4 ft 8 1/2 in (1,435 mm) standard gauge

The Budd SPV-2000 is a self-propelled diesel multiple unit railcar built by the Budd Company between 1978 and 1981 for use on North American commuter railroads. The design was a successor to Budd's popular Rail Diesel Car (RDC) but based on the body of the Amfleet passenger car. It did not prove a success: Budd built 31 cars and they proved mechanically unreliable.

== Design ==
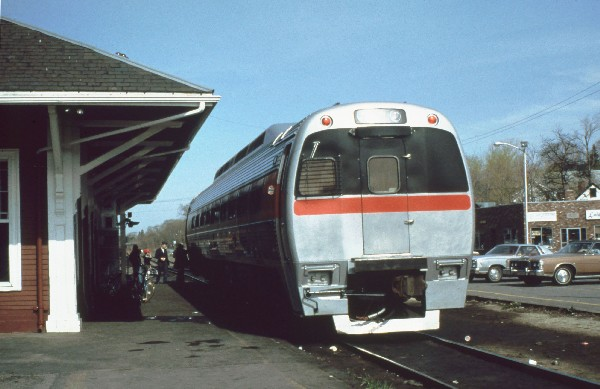
An SPV-2000 demonstrator at the Reading, Massachusetts station during testing on the MBTA in 1978

Budd announced the design in 1976. At the time it contemplated multiple unit operation of up to six cars with a top speed of 120 miles per hour (190 km/h). Power would be provided by 360 horsepower (270 kW) General Motors diesel engines. Popular Science depicted a tapered cab similar to the power car of the Advanced Passenger Train; the SPV-2000 would enter service with a more traditional blunt-end operator's cab. Budd said that SPV stood for "Special Purpose Vehicle" (Self-Propelled Vehicle became common), and emphasized the design's suitability for both intercity and commuter rail service.

The body shell of the SPV-2000 was very similar to the Amfleet passenger coach, which in turn was based on the Metroliner electric multiple unit. The SPV-2000 featured operator cabs at both ends and (in the standard configuration) 86 seats in 22 rows. There was an accessible toilet at one end and a small space to store luggage at the other. Metropolitan Transportation Authority (MTA) cars could seat 109.

== Operators ==
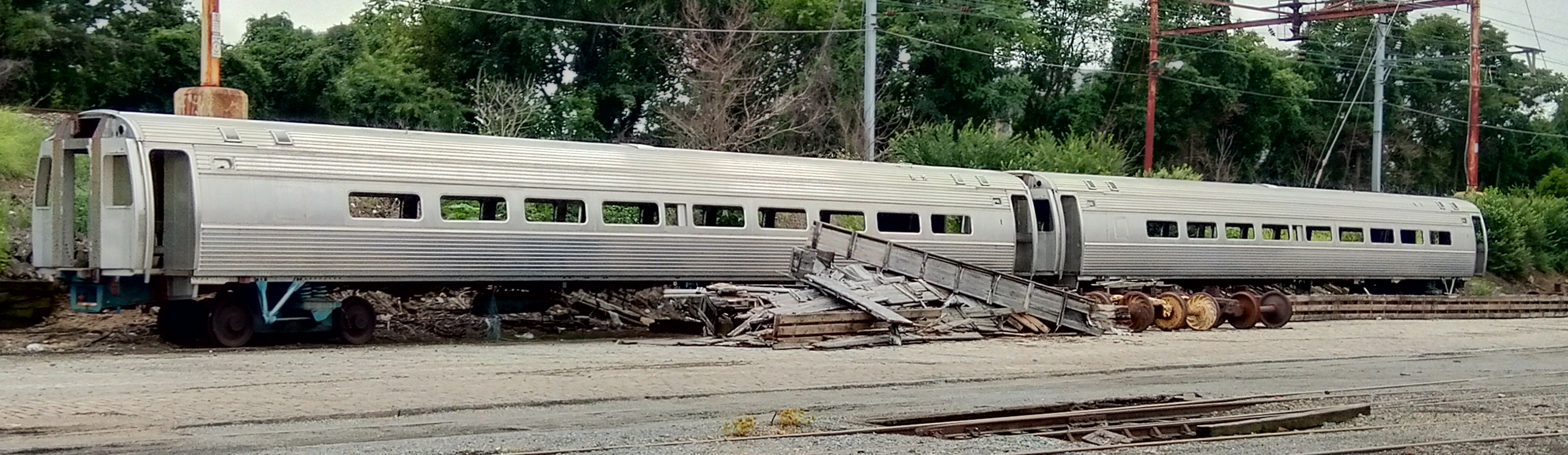
Incomplete SPV-2000 shells stored in Wilmington, Delaware

Budd unveiled the first SPV-2000 in Philadelphia on February 9, 1978, and then sent it on a demonstration tour around the United States. Budd eventually sold SPV-2000s to four customers: the Federal Railroad Administration (FRA), ONCF (Morocco state railways), the Connecticut Department of Transportation (ConnDOT), and the Metropolitan Transportation Authority (MTA). In 1978 Los Angeles County Supervisor Baxter Ward proposed using SPV-2000s on the former Pacific Electric line to Long Beach, California, but nothing came of this proposal. The SPV-2000s were considered for a resumption of Cape Cod rail service via Braintree, Massachusetts and an SPV-2000 made a demonstration run in August 1979, but nothing came of this either. Beyond the 30 cars it sold, Budd constructed the demonstrator and 14 incomplete shells. In the early 1990s the North American Carriages Company proposed to complete some of these shells as standard passenger cars for use in a new service between San Antonio, Texas and Monterrey, Nuevo León, to be called the Royal Eagle, but nothing came of the proposal.

=== FRA ===
The Federal Railroad Administration purchased a single SPV-2000 in 1981 and converted it into a track geometry car which it designated T-10. The T-10 remained in service with the FRA until 2000 when it was replaced by newer equipment. It was then sold to Caltrain.

=== ONCF ===
Budd sold six SPV-2000s to ONCF (the Moroccan state railways) for use on King Hassan II's royal train. Under King Mohammed VI, Hassan II's successor, the train has fallen into disuse.

=== ConnDOT ===
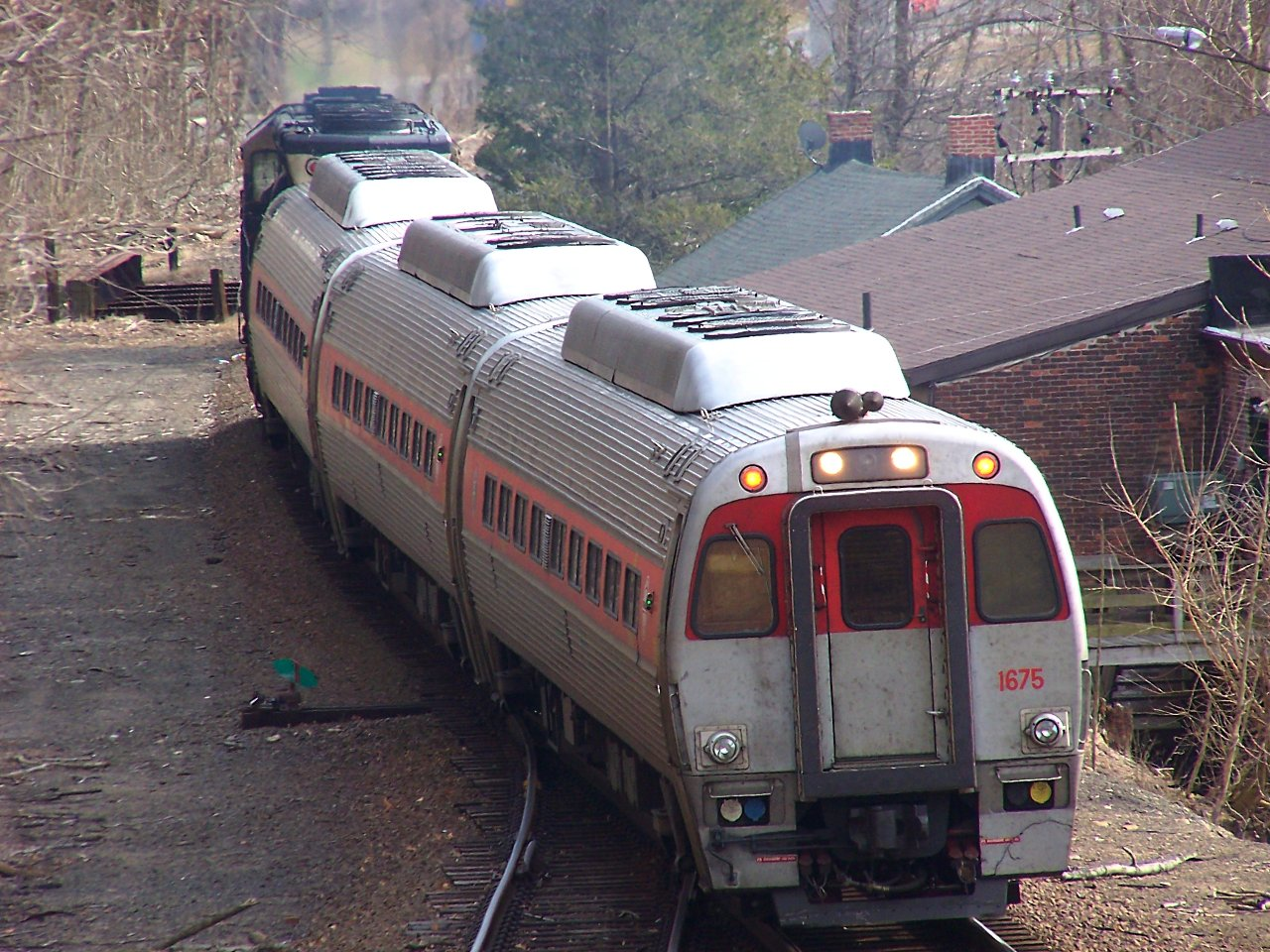
Waterbury Branch train with Constitution Liner coaches in 2006

The Connecticut Department of Transportation purchased 13 SPV-2000s at roughly $1 million apiece in 1980 (equivalent to $3.91 million in 2025 adjusted for inflation); 12 for use on the New Haven–Springfield Line and one for commuter service on the Danbury Branch. The New Haven–Springfield Line cars were leased to Amtrak (numbered 988–999) and painted in Amtrak's Phase III livery. The cars were designed to be interoperable with Amfleet cars; for a brief period, Springfield shuttles were coupled to the rear of Boston trains at New Haven to provide through service to Washington, D.C.

The cars proved mechanically unreliable and were often pulled by locomotives, leading to the derisive sobriquet "Seldom Powered Vehicles". Amtrak withdrew them on January 12, 1986 and placed conventional locomotive-hauled Amfleet trains on the route. The cars saw some use on the Metro-North Railroad; most were stored in New Haven. In 1994, the remaining 11 were de-powered and converted to coaches for use on Shore Line East commuter service. Dubbed "Constitution Liners", they were the primary coaches for Shore Line East until replaced by Mafersa coaches in 2004. In 2018, seven of the former ConnDOT cars were sold to the Foxville and Northern Railroad (later Atlantic Railways).

=== MTA ===
The MTA purchased ten SPV-2000s for use on its Hudson Line between Croton–Harmon and Poughkeepsie. The order cost $12 million. The SPV-2000s made their first runs on October 17, 1981. This run was coordinated with the re-opening of the New Hamburg station. Problems with the SPV-2000s developed quickly, and a 1982 New York magazine article characterized the cars as "defective". The MTA SPV-2000s are all out of service; one is preserved at the Connecticut Eastern Railroad Museum in Willimantic, Connecticut.

Five ex-MTA cars began usage as coaches on the Tren Interoceánico in Mexico in 2023.

== See also ==
- South Australian State Transport Authority 2000 class railcar
