= Comet (railcar) =

Class of locomotive-hauled railcars

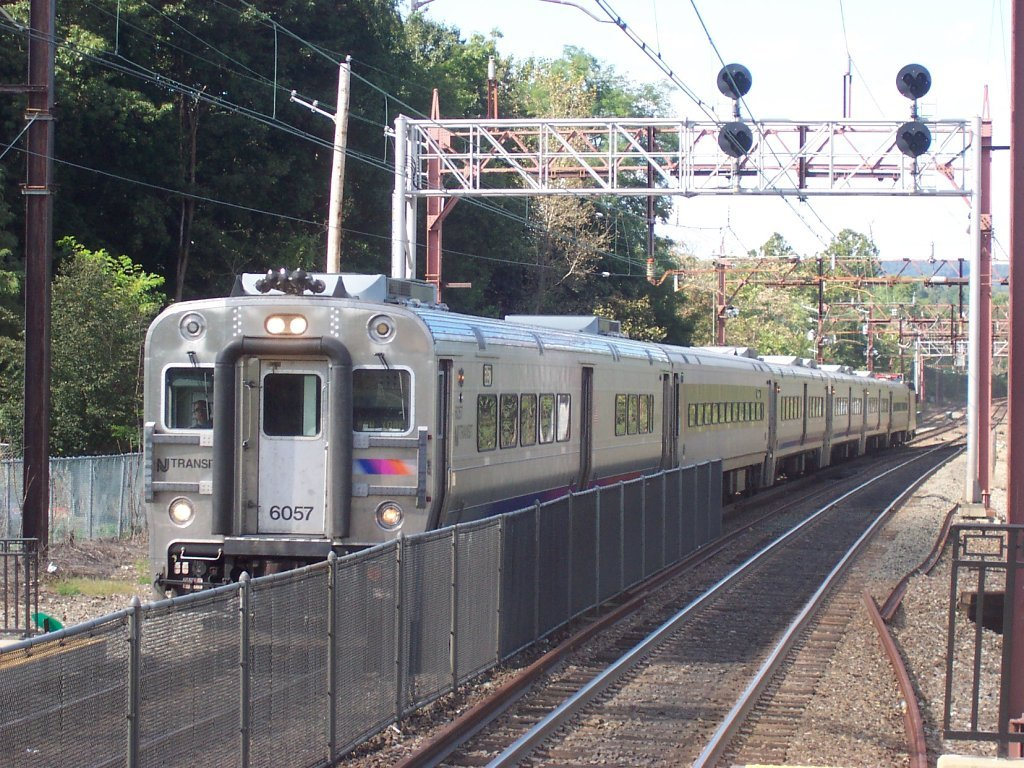
- A NJ Transit consist at Morristown lead by Comet V cab car 6057, followed by several other Comet cars
- Stock type: Push-pull coaches
- Manufacturers: Pullman Standard; Bombardier; Alstom
- Constructed: 1970–2005
- Entered service: 1970
- Capacity: 102–130
- Operators: Erie Lackawanna Railroad; Conrail; NJ Transit Rail Operations; Metro-North Railroad; SEPTA Regional Rail; Exo; FrontRunner; Amtrak California

Specifications
- Car body construction: Aluminum superstructure on steel underframe (Comet I–IV); All-stainless steel (Comet V, IA, IB)
- Maximum speed: 120 mph (190 km/h)
- Track gauge: 4 ft 8 1/2 in (1,435 mm) standard gauge

The Comet railcar is a class of locomotive-hauled railcars that was first designed in the late 1960s by Pullman-Standard as a modern commuter car for North American rail lines. Later, the Comet moniker was adopted by NJ Transit for all of its non-powered single level commuter coaches. Additional series of cars bearing the Comet name, based on the original design, have since been built by Bombardier Transportation and Alstom. The successful design was adopted by numerous commuter agencies.

== History ==
=== Comet I ===
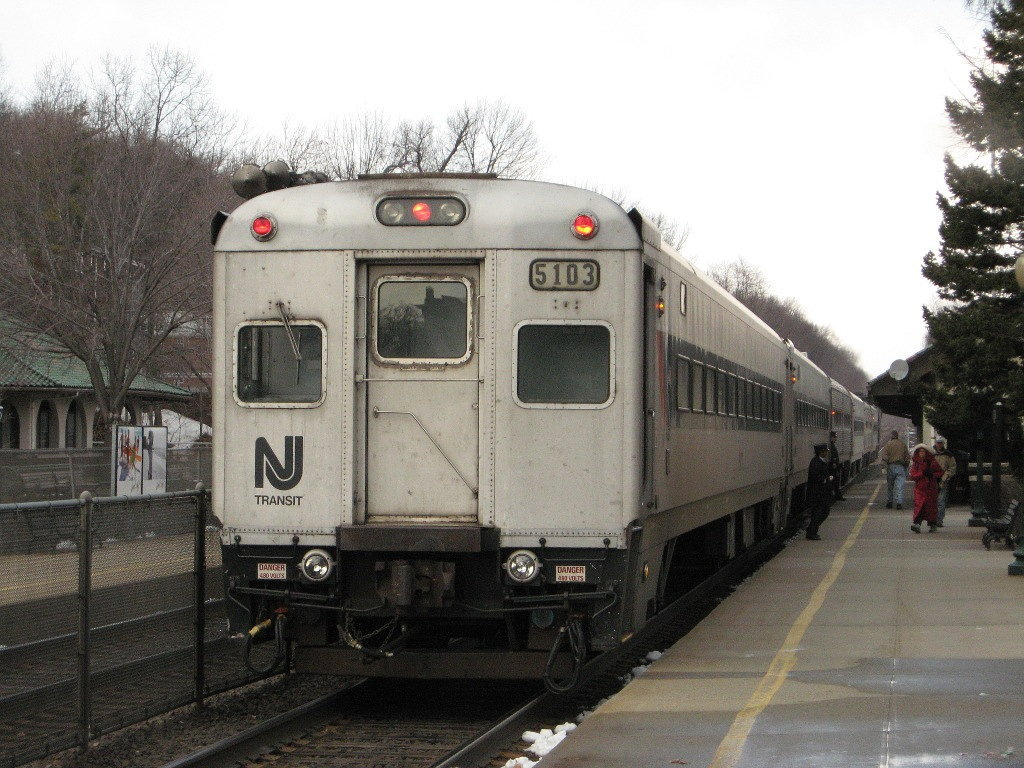
Comet I #5103 at Ridgewood

These cars were the first of the Comet series, built by Pullman Standard in 1970–73 for the New Jersey Department of Transportation and used the Erie-Lackawanna Railroad's diesel-hauled commuter services. These railcars were named after the Jersey Central train Blue Comet. These were considered state of the art at the time, due to their all-aluminum body shell construction as well as their use of head-end power (HEP). Their automated entrance doors, designed for use with low platforms only, earned them the nickname "Sliders". 155 cars were built, with 35 cab cars, 110 trailer coaches and 10 bar cars.

In 1987, the fleet was rebuilt by Bombardier at Barre, Vermont, with all 35 cab cars and a number of trailer cars receiving high doors, for ADA access and future compatibility with high platforms. They were given NJ Transit logos adjacent to the entrance doors at this time, as NJ Transit had taken over EL commuter service. The bar cars were converted to standard coaches.

The low door cars were retired from service in 2005. 25 of the cars were sold to Utah Transit Authority (UTA) for the FrontRunner service, and 20 were leased to Metrolink in 2008 to help with an acute car shortage there. In March 2011, Metrolink returned the cars to FrontRunner upon the expiration of the lease. Metrolink also leased 15 cars directly from New Jersey Transit in 2009. These cars have not been used since 2011. The Comet I cars have become popular with western commuter lines as the low door setup is compatible with the low-platform stations in use. Eight Comet Is were sold to SEPTA, but all except for one cab car (used in work service) have since been retired.

NJ Transit retired the last of its Comet Is in March 2009. The Comets that were not sold to SEPTA, Metrolink, UTA or to private railroads and museum fleets were scrapped by 2010. FrontRunner retired their Comet I cars on April 18, 2022, citing increased maintenance costs and low ridership; they were put up for auction in October 2022, lasting until November 2022. In May 2023, the railcars previously taken out of service by UTA were painted with HMRX (Note: reporting marks for 1304927 Ontario Ltd.) railcar markings and numbering onto the sides of them while inside of UTA's FrontRunner train yard. They were transported to Abilene and Smoky Valley Railroad in September 2023.

Preserved examples are located at several museums, including the Whippany Railway Museum in Whippany, New Jersey and the Southern California Railway Museum in Perris, California. Three of the Whippany Railway Museum's Comet I lcoaches, including Cab Control Car no. 5119, were later sold to Cape May Seashore Lines in 2025.

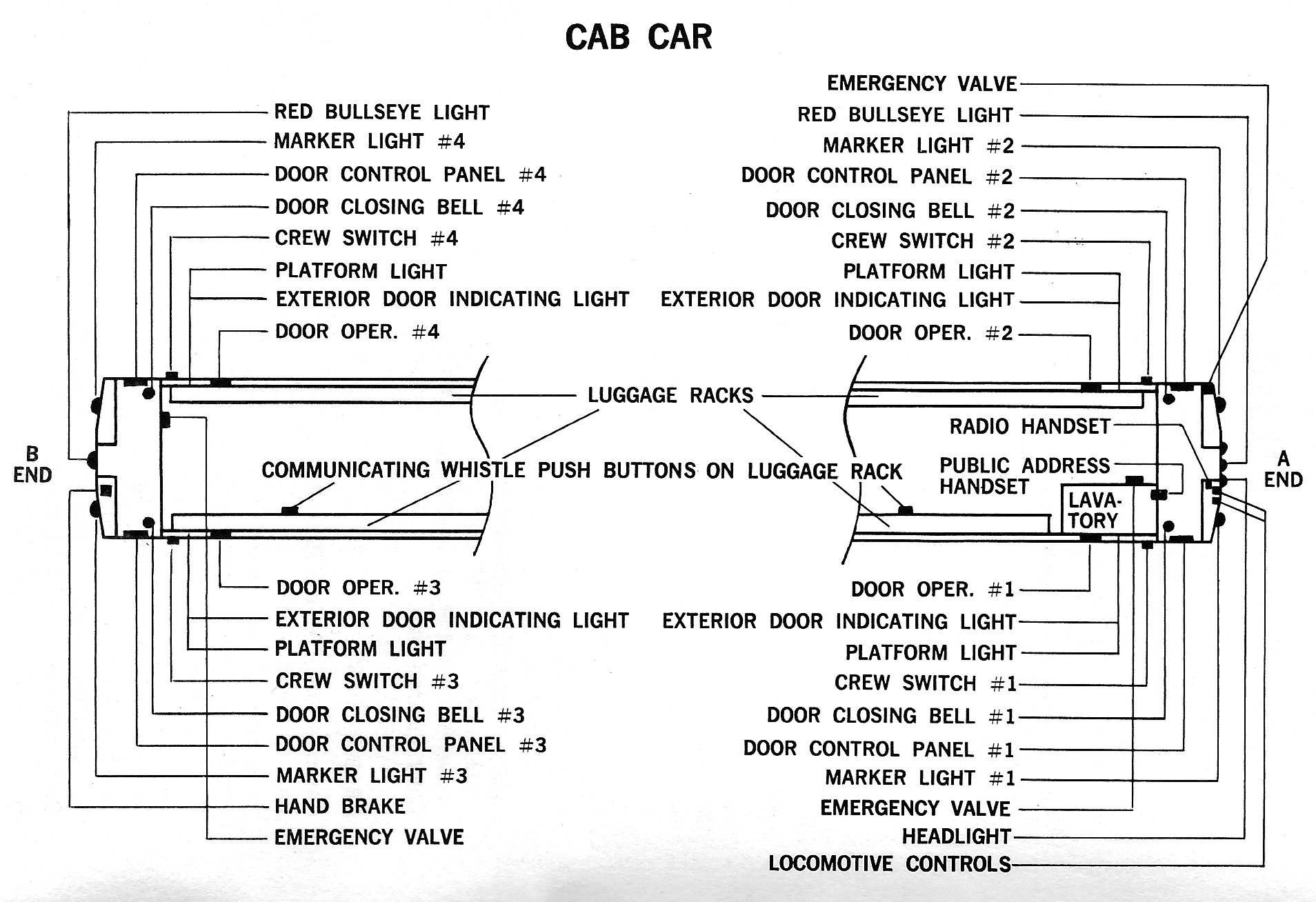
Cab car layout

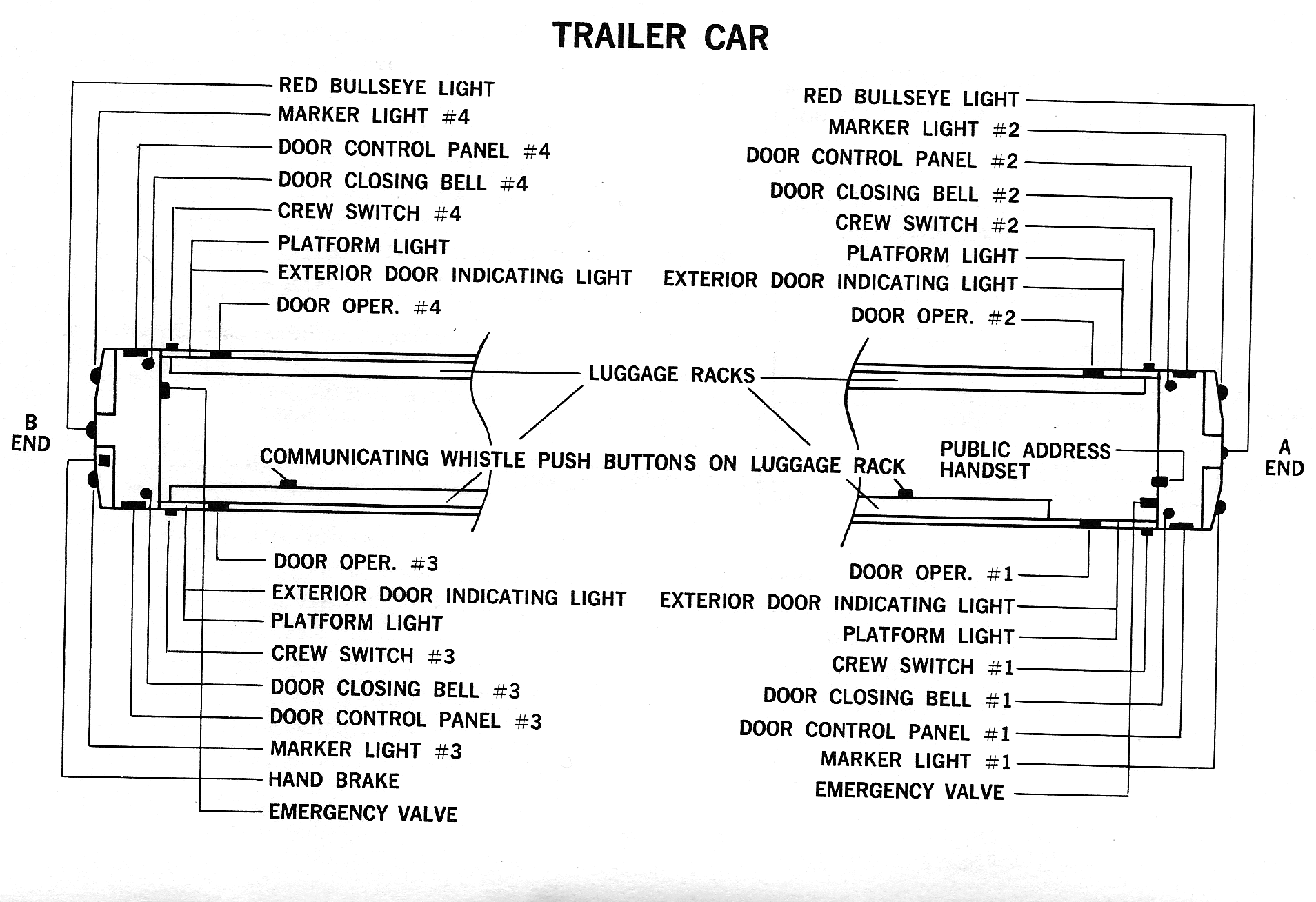
Trailer car layout

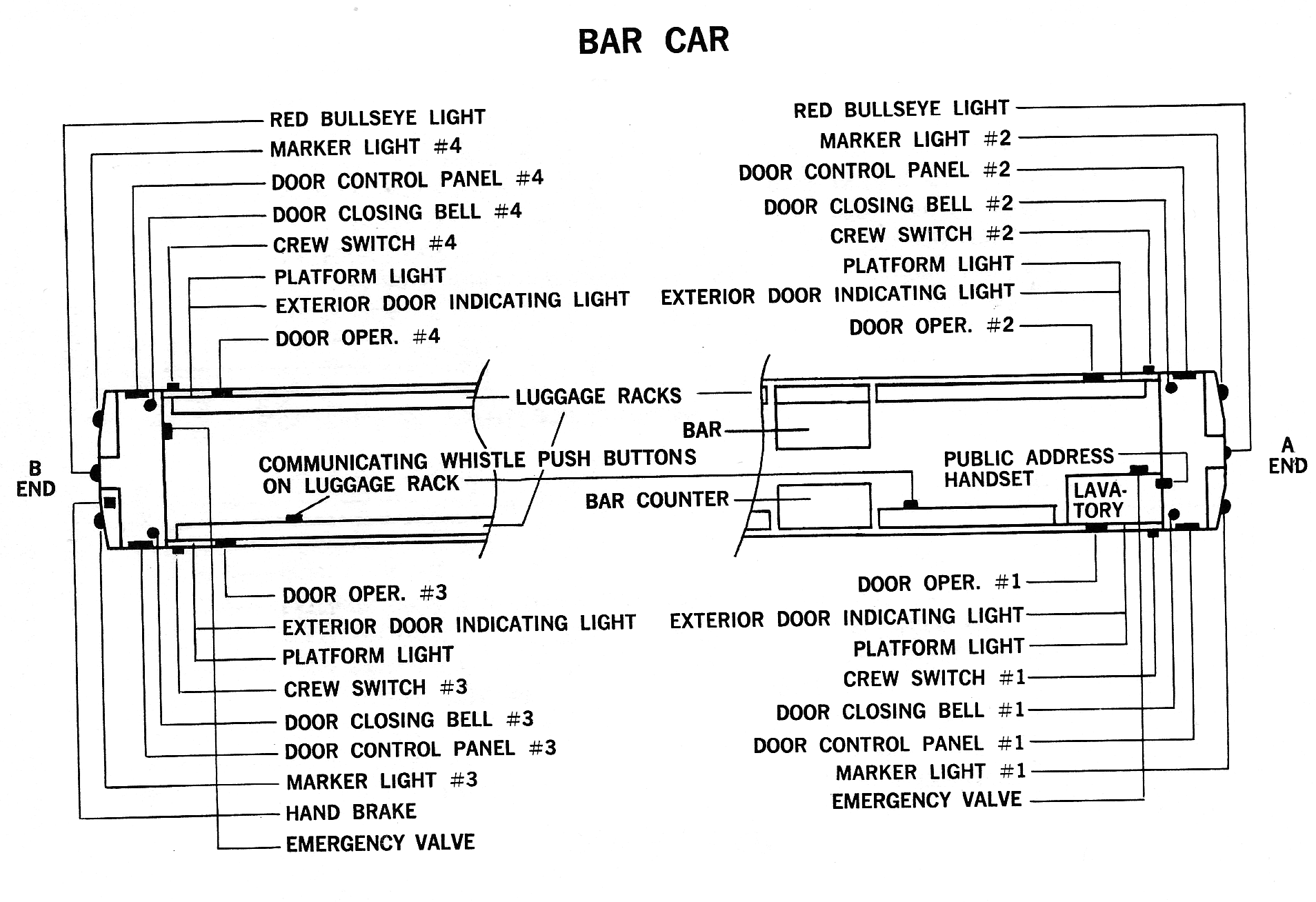
Bar car layout

=== Comet II ===
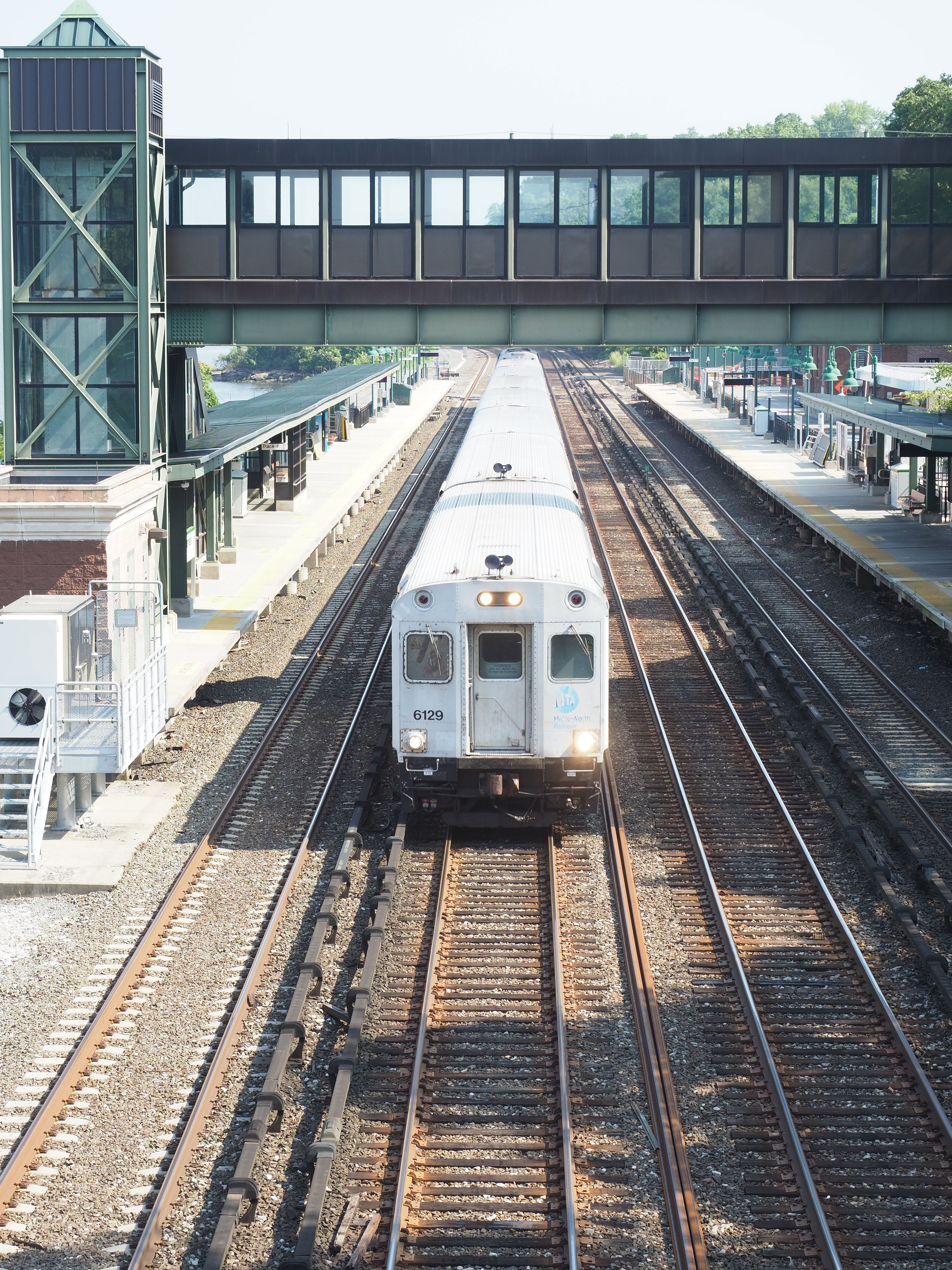
MNCR Comet II cab car #6129 leads a southbound train through Riverdale

The Comet II cars were built by Bombardier Transportation, which acquired the rights to the railcar's design from Pullman. The first order of cars was built for NJ Transit between 1982 and 1983 and consisted of 142 trailer coaches and 19 cab cars. A second order, the Comet IIB, was purchased in 1988. These cars feature long end-doors with trapdoors over the stairs for use at both low-platform and high-platform stations. The cars are similar to the MBTA's BTC-1 and CTC-1 cars, built in 1978 by Pullman Standard. These cars were intended for use on lines formerly operated by the Central Railroad of New Jersey, operator of the Blue Comet train to Atlantic City. This led to the NJ Transit series of single-level cars becoming known as Comets. These cars have been overhauled by AAI Corporation and Alstom between 1999 and 2003 to make them aesthetically and technologically similar to the Comet IV series and are now compatible with later equipment. They are now mostly used on Newark Division or Midtown Direct trains, as well as the Atlantic City Line.

Shoreliner I and II coaches, purchased by Metro-North and the Connecticut Department of Transportation for use on non-electrified territories east of the Hudson River, are variations without long doors. Amtrak's Horizon coaches are also a variation without long, automatic doors. Metro-North also purchased Comet II coaches for use on the Port Jervis Line, where they ran until replaced by the Comet V. They have since been transferred to the East-of-Hudson pool, where they remain in service. SEPTA Regional Rail and AMT (later Exo) also purchased cars based on this class. The 24 ex-Exo cars were later sold to SEPTA in March 2026.

=== Comet III ===
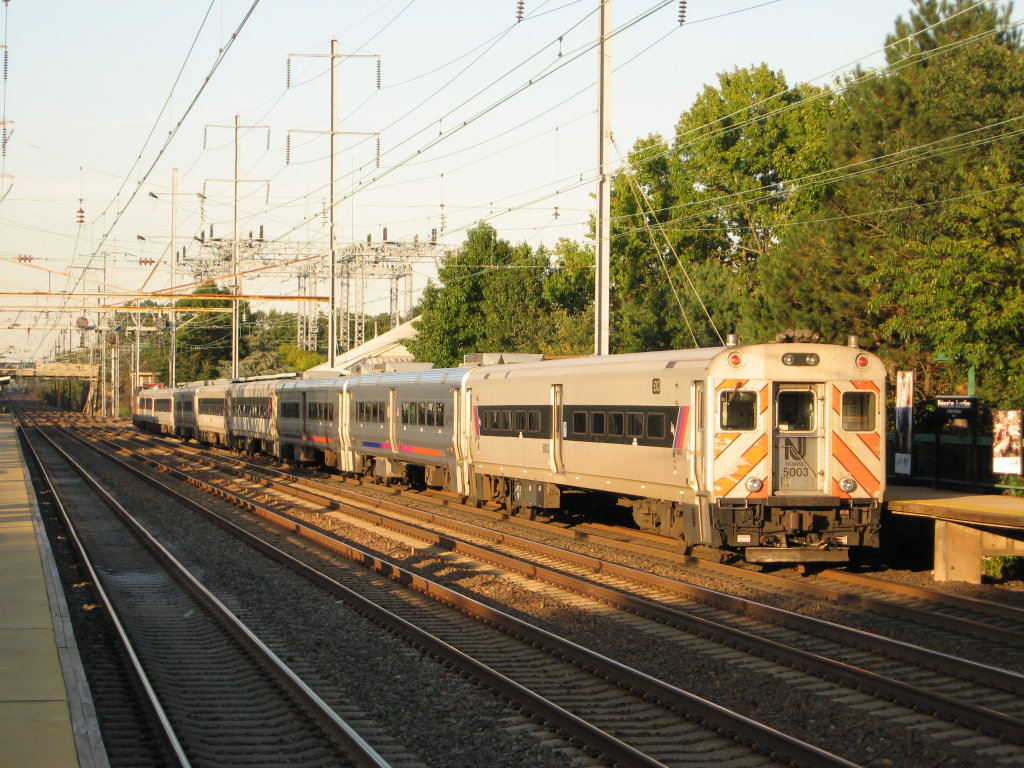
A Comet III cab car on the end of a NJT train at Princeton Junction

The Comet III cars, ordered by NJ Transit in 1990, feature center doors and long end-doors, permitting end doors to open and close with traps open. The Metro-North Shoreliner III fleet is a variation without long doors. The Comet III fleet was removed from revenue service between 2009-2010 and remained in storage until 2022, when it was decided to dispose of the cars as scrap. 46 of the 49 remaining cars were scrapped in June/July 2022 in Neptune Yard near the Bradley Beach station.

One car - car 5522 - remains in NJ Transit's Bay Head Yard. Two other cars are owned by Metro-North; these were originally numbered 5179 and 5180. These cars were sold to NJT in 1998 and renumbered to 5009 and 5010, but were later sold back to Metro-North in 2008. In 2022, car 5010 was converted to a rail adhesion car; it was retrofitted with high-powered lasers to incinerate leaf residue.

=== Comet IV ===
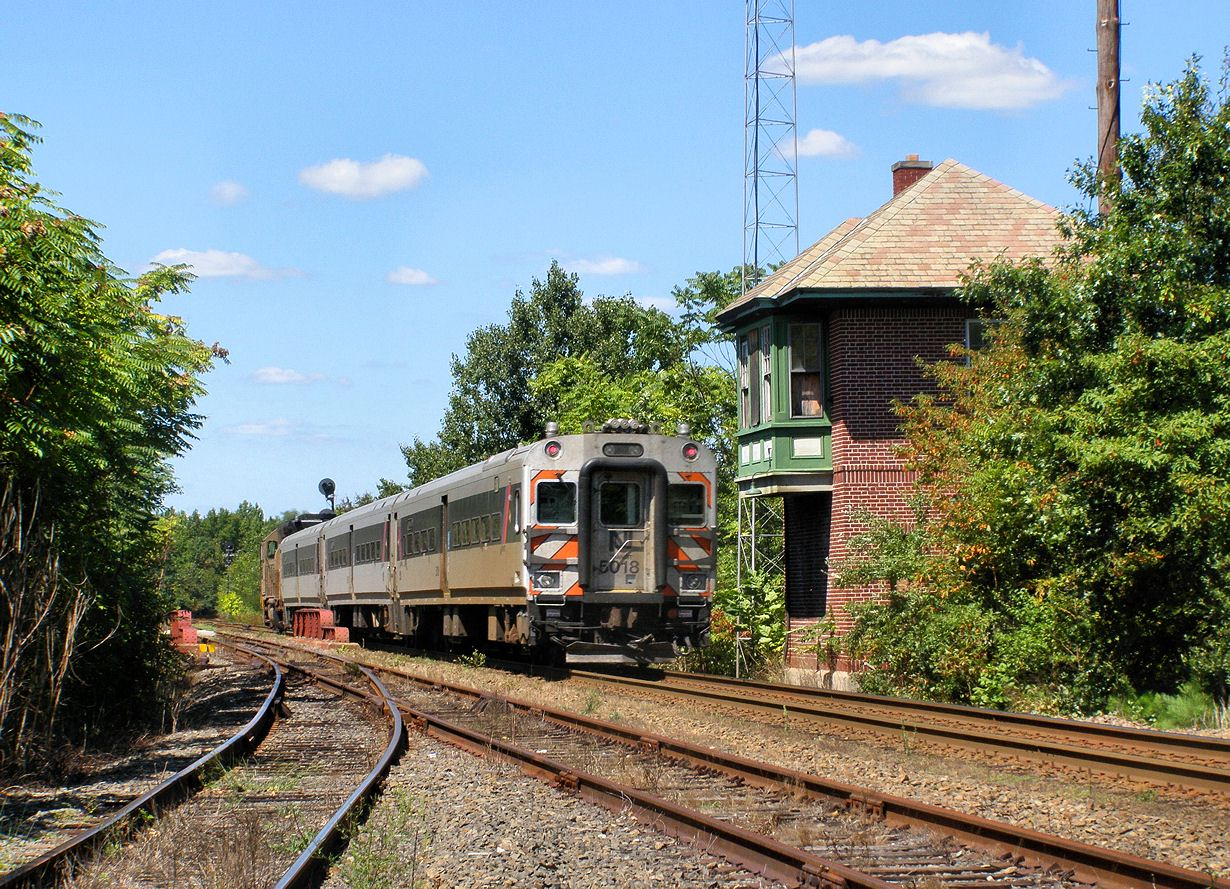
A train made of Comet IV cars operates on an Atlantic City Line train at Winslow Junction.

The Comet IV cars, delivered in 1996 and purchased for NJ Transit's new Midtown Direct service, are similar to the Comet III cars, except they have no door by the engineer's cab, have thicker black stripes along the window, exterior and interior LCD panels providing destination and station information, a new interior color scheme, and power operated saloon doors. Trains using older Comet coaches usually have a mix of IIs and IVs, as they are largely interchangeable. The major difference between the two models is the presence of a center door on the IVs. The Metro-North Shoreliner IV fleet is a variation without long doors.

With the completion of the Comet V order, Comet IV cab cars are no longer allowed to trail or lead a train; their cab controllers were deactivated in 2013. Since then, they are now used exclusively as blind coaches, in which they are inserted into a train consist and act as regular trailer cars.

=== Comet V ===
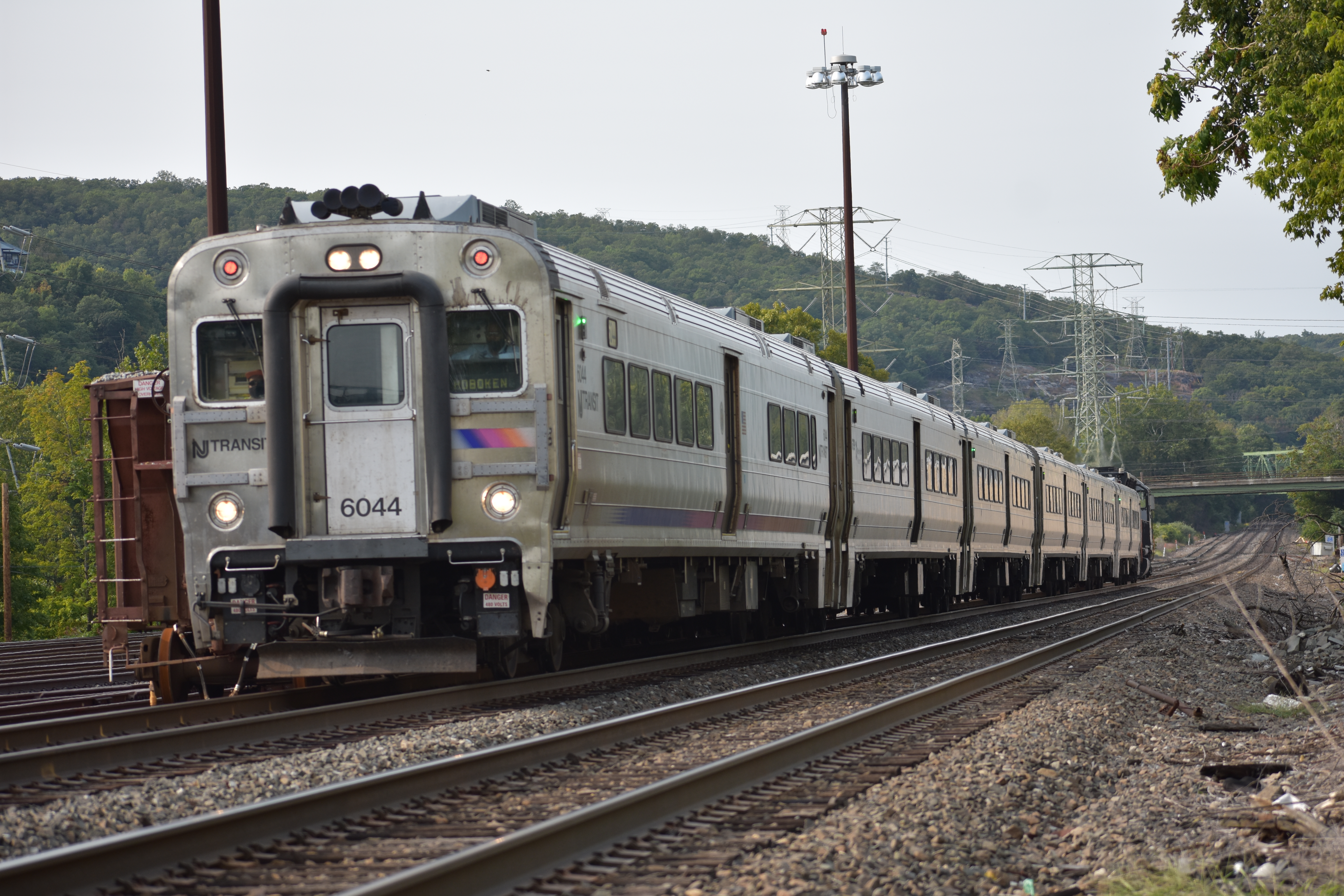
Comet V cab car 6044 leading an NJT train near Suffern station

These cars were ordered in 1999 by NJ Transit and Metro-North Railroad and delivered between 2002 and 2004. Unlike previous series which were built by Bombardier, the Comet Vs were built by Alstom. The major external differences are a stainless-steel exterior, larger windows, and visible, roof-mounted air conditioning units. Comet V trailers are almost exclusively used for Hoboken-bound diesel trains. Comet V cab cars are also used to lead trains of Comet II/IV trailers, as they lack functional cabs.

== "Comaro" coaches ==
The "Comet" name was also applied to two distinct orders of coaches used on NJ Transit lines. As both orders had connections to the Arrow series of electric multiple unit (EMU) cars, they have become known as "Comaros", a blend of "Comet" and "Arrow", and a play on the name of the Chevrolet Camaro.

=== Comet IA ===
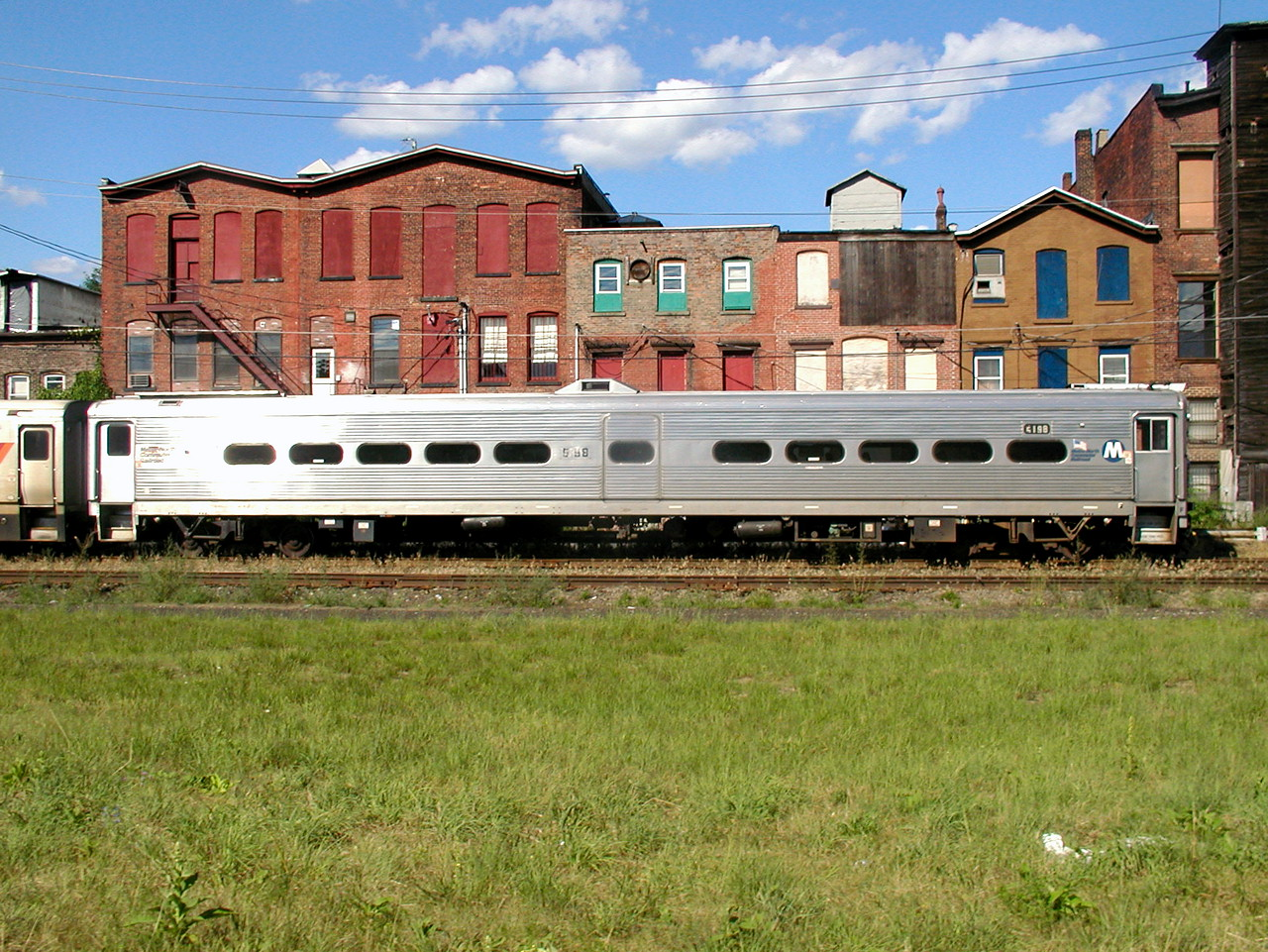
Metro North Comet IA #9198 at Port Jervis in 2002

Ten Comet IA cars (two cabs and eight trailers) were built in 1978 by General Electric for the Metropolitan Transportation Authority from surplus shells from Avco and Canadian Vickers remaining from the "Arrow III" EMU fleet built for NJDOT. They saw use primarily on the Port Jervis Line. These cars were retired in 2004 and scrapped by 2006.

=== Comet IB ===
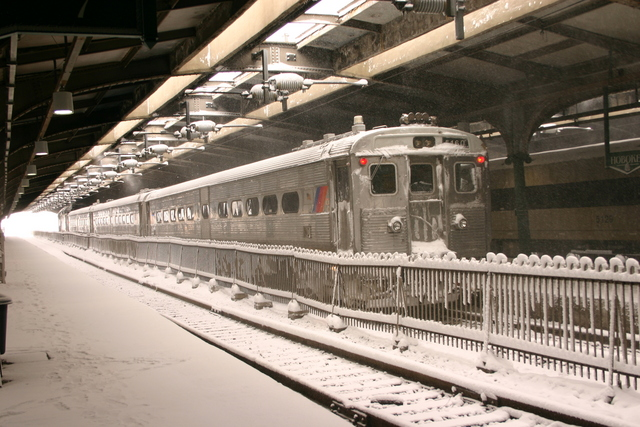
NJT Comet IB Cab Car #5160 at Hoboken Terminal

The Comet IB cars were rebuilt from 30 former Penn Central Arrow I EMU cars originally built by the St. Louis Car Company between 1968 and 1969. The Arrow I cars suffered from chronic mechanical problems and were out of service by 1980. The cars sat unused for several years, but realizing that the car bodies still had many decades of service left on them, NJ Transit made the decision to have them rebuilt into un-powered coaches. In 1987 and 1988 the cars were converted into cab control cars and trailer coaches by Morrison-Knudsen for use on non-electrified lines. After two decades of service the Comet IB cars were retired by NJ Transit in late 2008, with some surplus cars temporarily leased to Exo's predecessor agency, the Agence métropolitaine de transport (AMT).

==== Amtrak California refurbishment ====
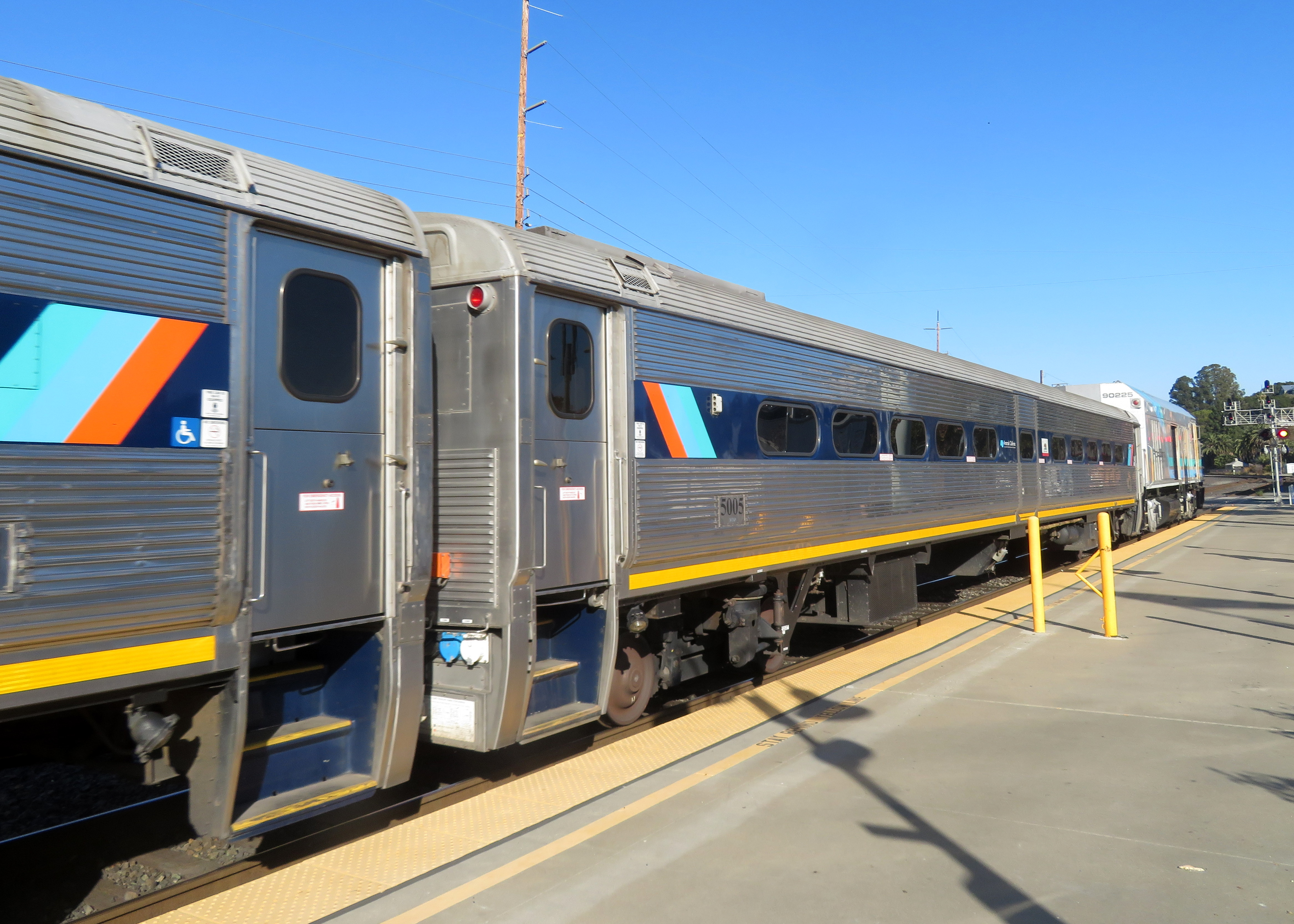
Comet IB coaches on an Amtrak San Joaquins train at the Martinez station, 2019.

In 2008, Caltrans purchased 14 Comet IB coaches from NJ Transit for $75,000 per car to relieve overcrowding on the popular San Joaquins route. The Comet IB coaches were refurbished at Amtrak's Beech Grove shops to make them more suitable for inter-city rail service including adding reclining seats with tray tables (with only four seats in a row), more luggage racks, a restroom, Wi-Fi and 6 workstation tables in the center of the car. 12 of the cars California purchased from NJ Transit were cab cars and were reconfigured into trailer cars by removing the train controls and plating over the cab windows. Instead they are used with Non-Powered Control Units (former EMD F40PH locomotives converted to cab cars) that have cab controls and space to store checked baggage.

Caltrans had planned to use the "Comet car" trainsets on trains starting in July 2013, but the refurbishing process took longer than expected. The first of the Caltrans Comet IB coaches, 5008 (ex-NJT 5165) was completed in March 2013. The first "Comet car" trainset was put into regular service on October 21, 2013, and the second trainset was put into regular service on April 15, 2014. The Comet cars will eventually be replaced by new Siemens Venture trainsets, after which there are plans to move them to Southern California for use on other routes.

On the night of June 27, 2024, six Comet railcars as well as two EMD F40PH NPCU cab cars (CDTX 90215 and 90225) were delivered to Los Angeles after being attached in Oakland to the Coast Starlight. The Comet railcars and NPCUs are currently being used on the Pacific Surfliner service as backups or for emergency situations when a bi level set cannot be provided.

== See also ==
- Horizon (railcar) – intercity railcars operated by Amtrak based on the Comet design.
- Shoreliner – commuter railcars operated by Metro-North based on the Comet design.
