= Mafersa coaches =

Type of railroad car

Mafersa Coach
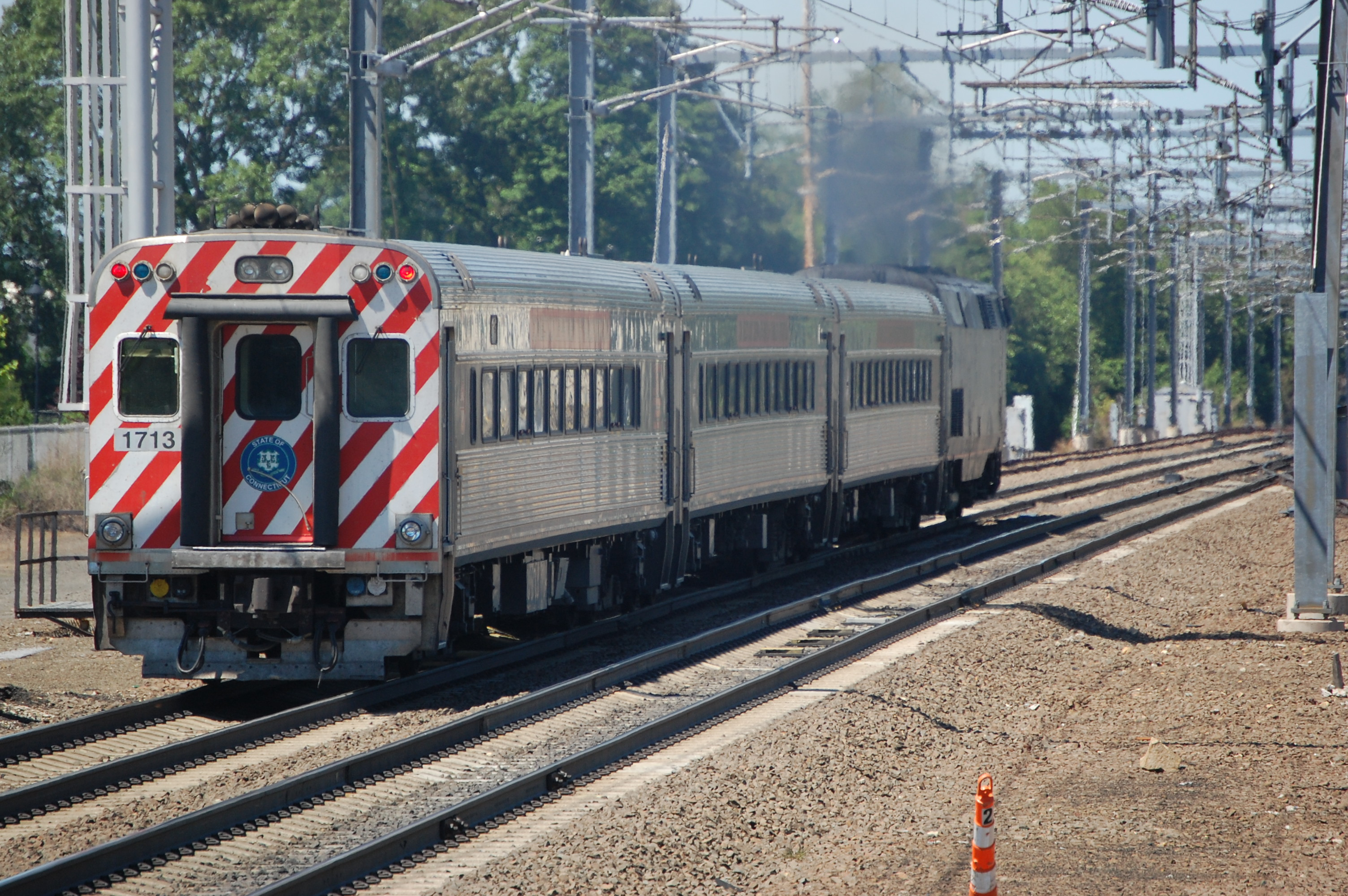
- Mafersa coaches in Shore Line East service, 2018

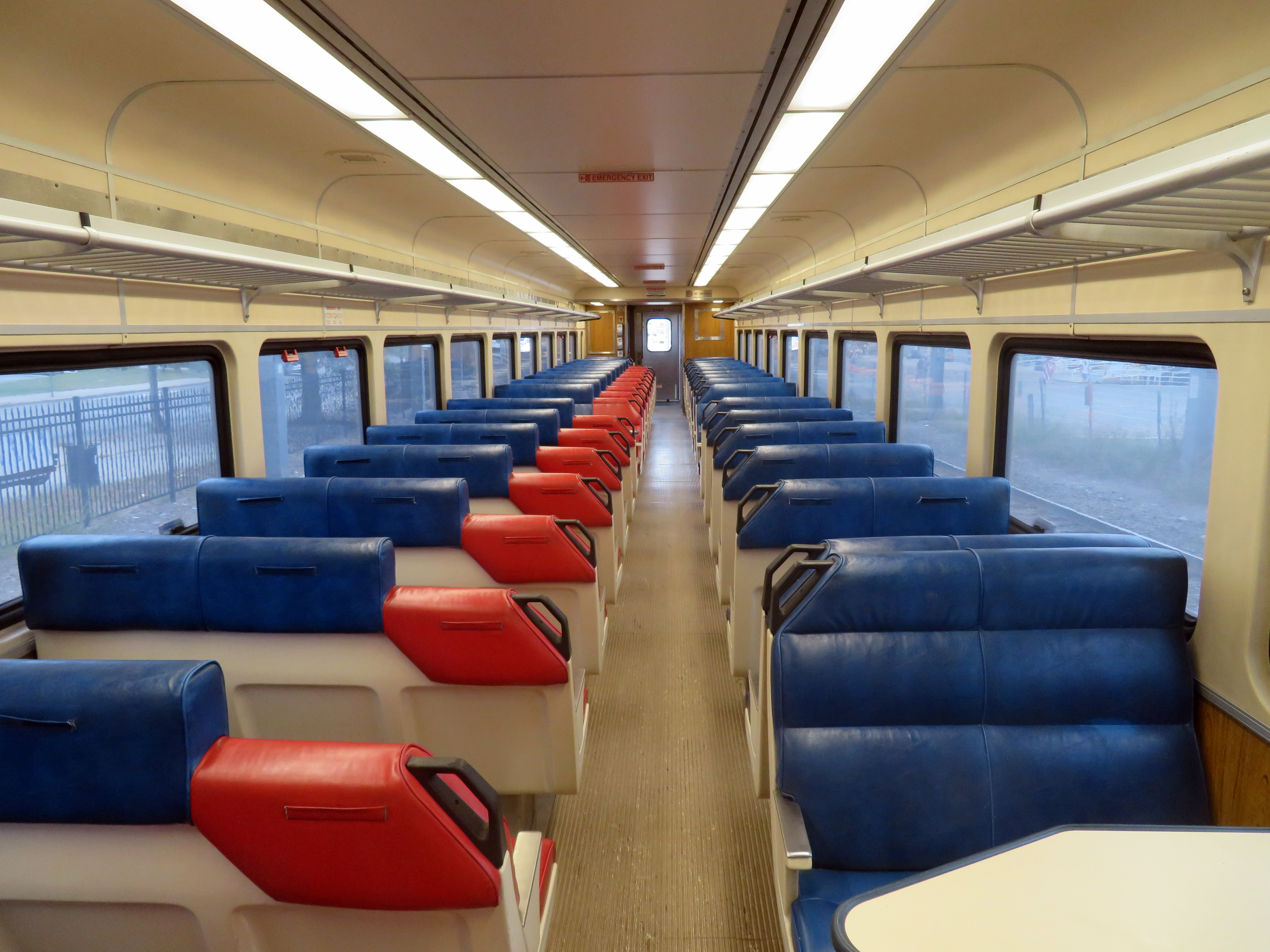
- Interior of a Mafersa coach, 2018
- Manufacturer: Mafersa
- Constructed: 1991–1992
- Entered service: 1992
- Number built: 38
- Operators: CT Rail; QIT-Fer et Titane
- Line served: Hartford Line

Specifications
- Car body construction: Stainless steel
- Car length: 85.3 ft (26 m)
- Width: 10 ft (3 m)
- Height: 13.29 ft (4.05 m)
- Floor height: 51.5 in (1.31 m)
- Doors: 2 per side, manually operated
- Maximum speed: 90 mph (140 km/h)
- Power supply: Head end power (480 V AC at 60 Hz)
- Braking system: Air
- Coupling system: Janney Type H Tightlock
- Track gauge: 4 ft 8 1/2 in (1,435 mm) standard gauge

The Mafersa coaches are a class of 38 passenger railroad cars built by Brazilian manufacturer Mafersa. Originally built for Virginia Railway Express (VRE) in 1991–92, they are currently owned and operated by the Connecticut Department of Transportation (CTDOT) for use on the CT Rail service and by the Canadian mining company QIT-Fer et Titane.

== History ==
Mafersa built the coaches new for VRE for US$24.7 million (equivalent to $57 million in 2025).

VRE sold 33 of the coaches to CTDOT in 2004 for its Shore Line East service. The CTDOT cars were used for Shore Line East service until 2022, then moved to Hartford Line service.

QIT-Fer et Titane, a Canadian mining company, purchased the remaining five cars in 2007 for its private industrial rail service after submitting an unsolicited proposal to VRE for $1.75 million, or $350,000 per car. According to VRE officials, the company planned to convert the former passenger coaches into dormitory cars for transporting employees to and from its mining operations near Havre-Saint-Pierre, Quebec.

In August 2023, CTDOT approved a contract with Alstom for 60 single-level passenger cars, which will replace the Mafersa coaches in Hartford Line service (as well as Shoreliner cars on other lines) beginning in early 2027.
