= Shoreliner =

Locomotive-hauled rail car used by the Metro-North Railroad

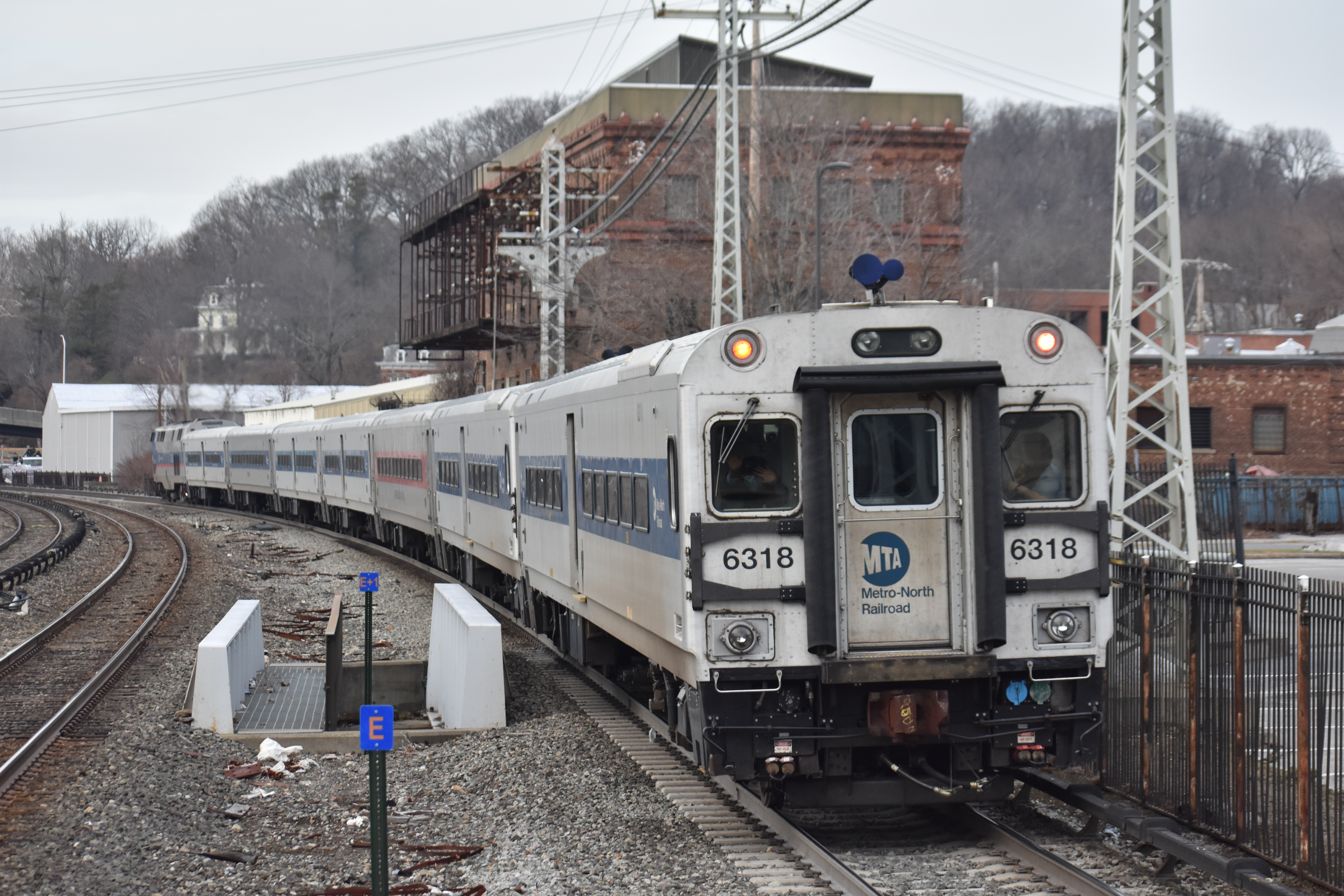
- Metro-North Shoreliner IV on the Hudson Line
- In service: 1983-present
- Manufacturer: Bombardier Transportation
- Constructed: 1983–1998
- Entered service: Shoreliner I: 1983; Shoreliner II: 1987; Shoreliner III: 1991; Shoreliner IV: 1996
- Number built: Shoreliner I: 39; Shoreliner II: 36; Shoreliner III: 49; Shoreliner IV: 60; Total: 184
- Capacity: 102–130
- Operator: Metro-North Railroad
- Lines served: Hudson Line, New Haven Line, Harlem Line

Specifications
- Car length: 85 ft (25.91 m)
- Width: 10.5 ft (3.2 m)
- Doors: Shoreliner I and II: 4 Shoreliner III: 6 Shoreliner IV: 6 (5 on cab units)
- Maximum speed: 90 mph (145 km/h) (Limit); 120 mph (193 km/h) (Design)

Shoreliners are a class of locomotive-hauled rail car used by the Metro-North Railroad. They are similar to the Comet coaches used by New Jersey Transit. Ownership of the fleet is split between the Metropolitan Transportation Authority (MTA) and the Connecticut Department of Transportation (CTDOT), as part of the latter's operating agreement with the MTA. MTA coaches have blue window bands, while CTDOT coaches have red ones. Many of the Shoreliner cars are named in honor of people and places significant to their service area, such as The Connecticut Yankee and Washington Irving.

The Shoreliners are primarily used on non-electric territory such as the upper Hudson Line north of Croton-Harmon, on the upper Harlem Line north of Southeast station, and the New Haven Line's Danbury and Waterbury branches. They are typically operated in a push-pull configuration. Several sets were used for Shore Line East service in the early 1990s until used equipment was acquired.

== Models ==
The Shoreliner I and Shoreliner II cars were built in 1983 and 1987, respectively, and were based largely on the design of the Comet II cars built for New Jersey Transit. Both models have end vestibule doors and lack center doors. The Shoreliner I order consisted of 39 cars, while the Shoreliner II order added 36 cars. Cars numbered in the 6200 series, including 14 cab cars and 26 coaches, are owned by CTDOT, while the remaining cars are owned by the MTA.

Four Shoreliner I cars were originally equipped with underfloor head-end power generators for operation behind CTDOT's ex-freight locomotives that lacked onboard HEP capability. The generators were later removed after those locomotives were replaced by rebuilt GP40-2H units.

The Shoreliner III cars were introduced in 1991, with 49 cars built. Based on New Jersey Transit's Comet III design, they added a center door and relocated restroom facilities compared with earlier Shoreliner models.

The Shoreliner IV cars were based on the Comet IV design and built in two groups between 1996 and 1998. The first order, delivered in 1996 and 1997, consisted of 50 cars. A second order of 10 cars for CTDOT followed in 1998. Compared with the Shoreliner III design, the Shoreliner IV removed the engineer-side door on cab cars as a safety measure.

== Future ==
In August 2023, CTDOT approved a contract with Alstom for 60 single-level Adessia passenger cars. The cars will supplement the existing Shoreliner coach fleet on the Waterbury Branch and the Danbury Branch, as well as the Mafersa coaches and leased MBTA MBB coaches on the Hartford Line. Deliveries are expected to begin in 2026.

In May 2026, Metro-North issued a request for proposals for 252 single-level coaches to replace the Shoreliner fleet. It would include an option for 377 additional cars to support potential service expansion. The contract is to be awarded in early 2027 with deliveries beginning in 2029.

== Gallery ==
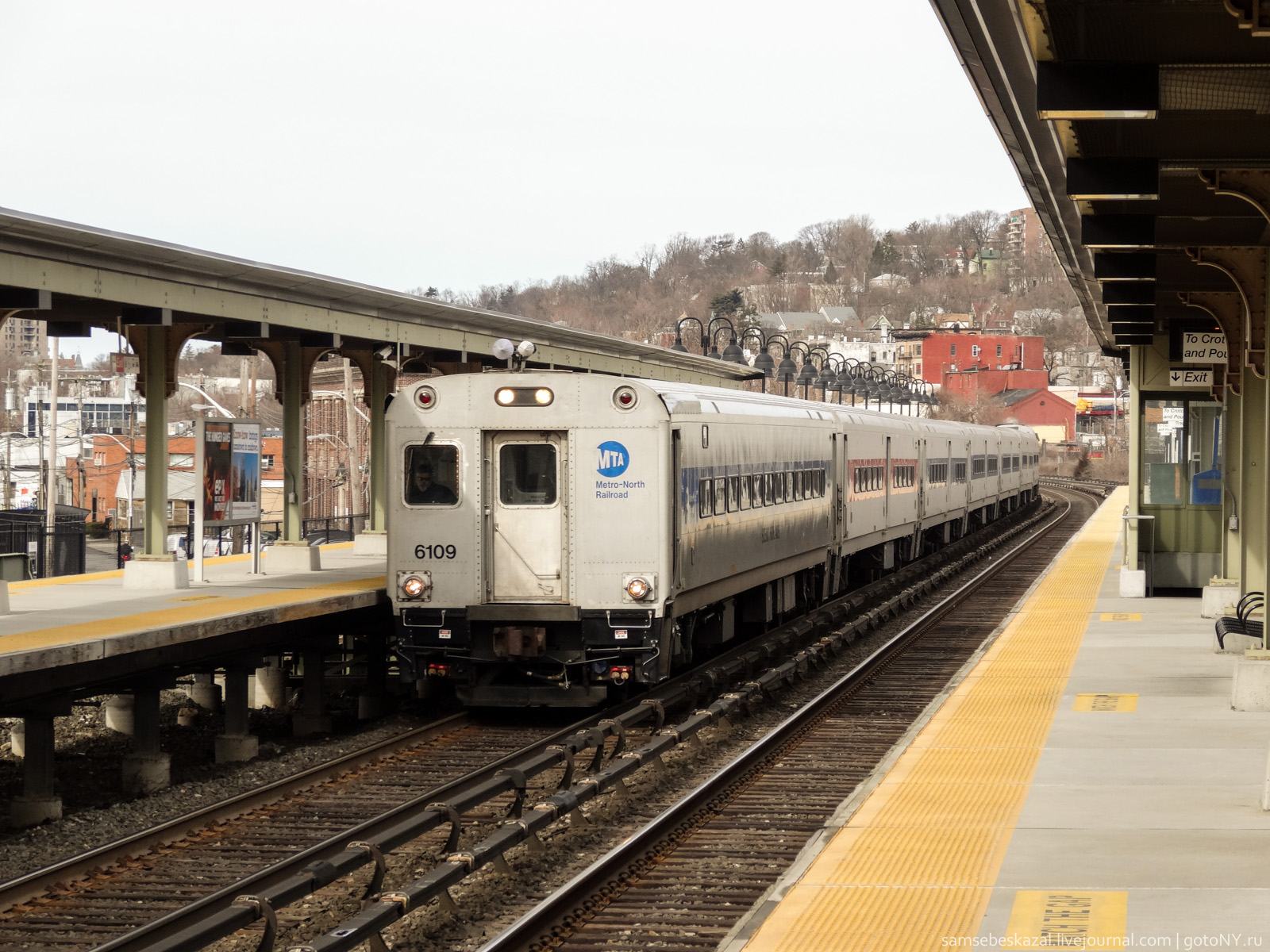
Shoreliner I entering Yonkers station.

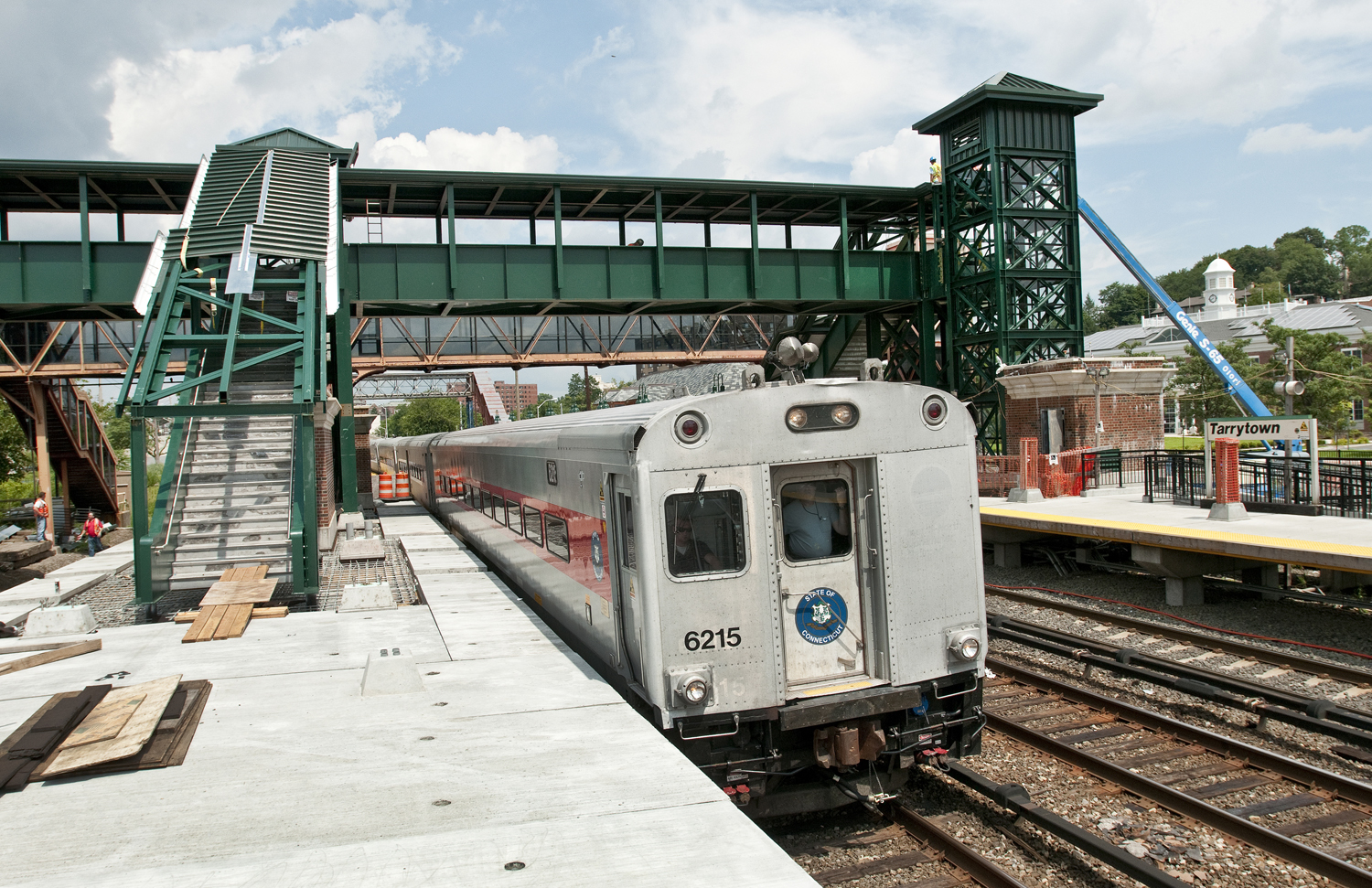
Shoreliner II entering Tarrytown station.

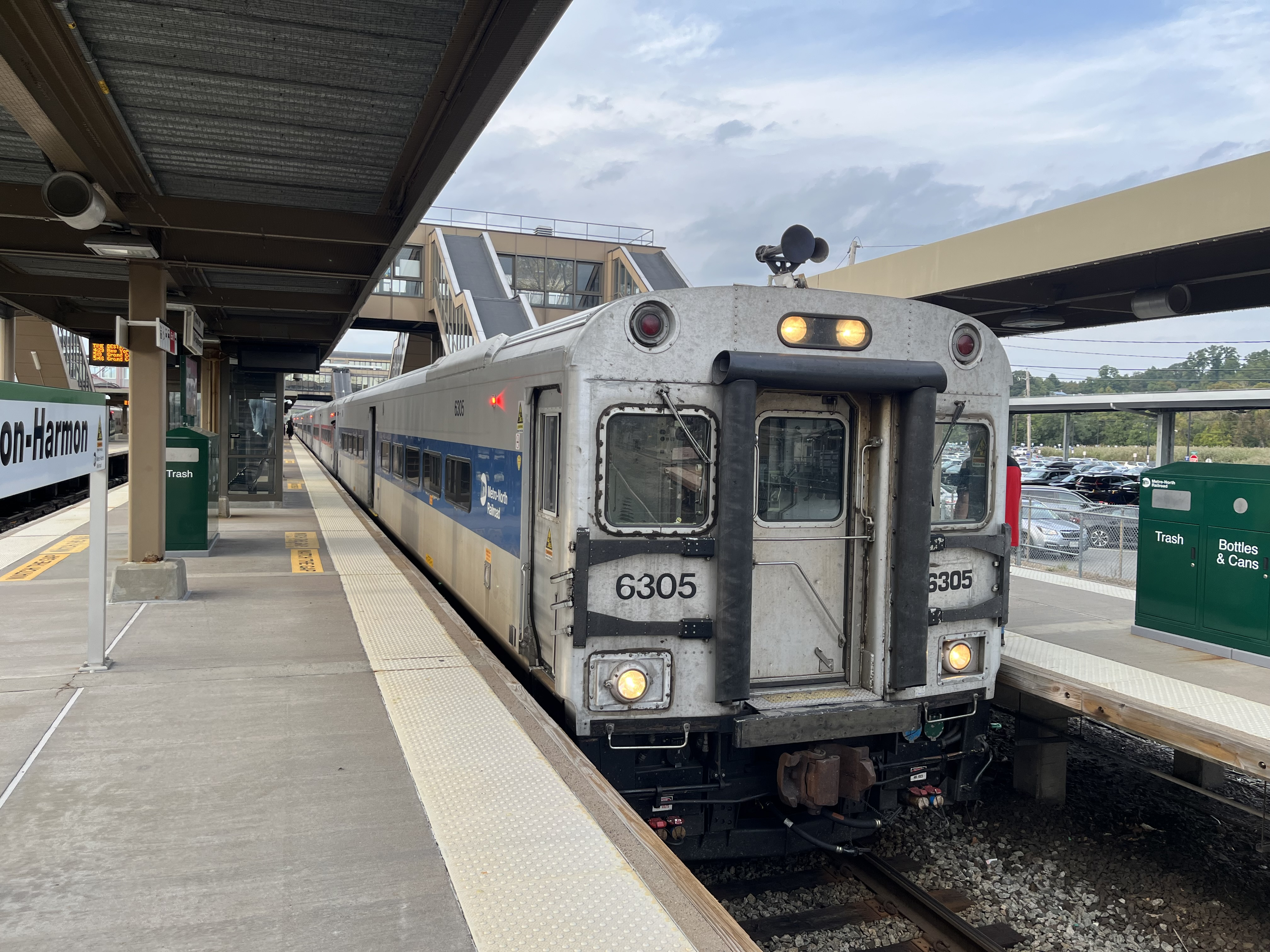
Shoreliner III idle at Croton-Harmon station.

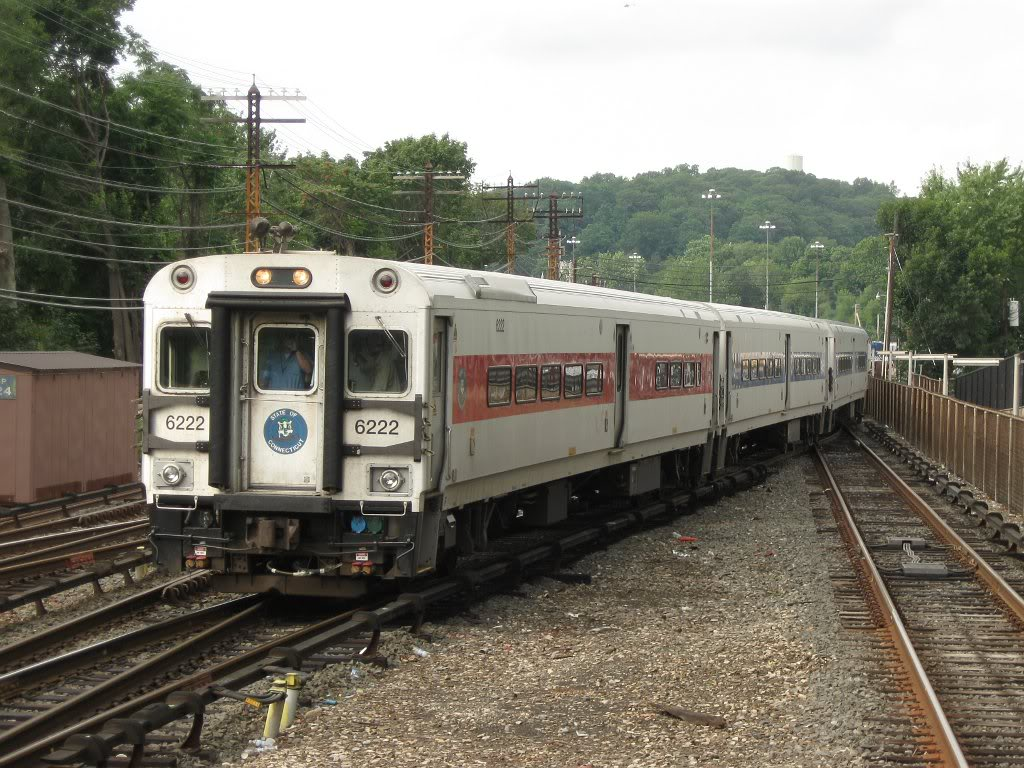
Shoreliner IV car enters North White Plains station. Car 6222 was destroyed in the December 2013 Spuyten Duyvil derailment.

== See also ==
- Horizon (railcar) – intercity railcars operated by Amtrak also based on the Comet design.
