= List of bascule bridges =

A list of bascule bridges by country:

== Australia ==
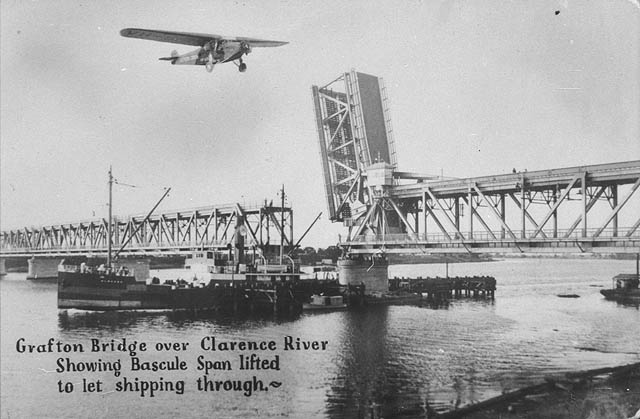
The Grafton Bridge (New South Wales) over the Clarence River showing the Bascule span lifted to let shipping through (Postcard from about 1932; The "Southern Cross" aeroplane has been added to the photograph.)

- Birkenhead Bridge carries traffic across the Port River at Port Adelaide
- Tom 'Diver' Derrick Bridge - Port Adelaide, South Australia, single leaf road bascule
- Mary MacKillop Bridge - Port Adelaide, South Australia, single leaf rail bascule
- Batemans Bay Bridge, Batemans Bay, New South Wales, over the Clyde River - replaced by new bridge in 2021
- Spit Bridge - Sydney
- Grafton Bridge - Grafton, New South Wales rail lower deck, road upper deck - lift span out of use
- Narooma Bridge - Narooma, still in use in 2023
- Carrathool Bridge - Carrathool, New South Wales, across the Murrumbidgee River - the last surviving example of a particular type of bascule lift span
- Broadwater Bridge, across the Richmond River - built using the renovated bascule span from the demolished Barneys Point Bridge on the Tweed River (New South Wales), converted from counterweight to hydraulic ram lift.
- Bridge on Franklin Wharf, Constitution Dock, Hobart
- Marina Bridge - Bridge over Auckland Creek, on Bryan Jordan Dr, West Gladstone
- Swansea Bridge at Swansea, New South Wales, twin opening bascule bridge still in use 2026

== Belgium ==
Open Boulevard Bridge with the Nijverheid Bridge in the background

- Berendrecht Bridge, Antwerp, 68 m long span across the Berendrecht Lock at Port of Antwerp
- Oudendijk Bridge, Antwerp, 68 m long span across the Berendrecht Lock at Port of Antwerp
- Zandvliet Bridge, Antwerp, 57 m long span across the Zandvliet Lock at Port of Antwerp
- Frederik Hendrik Bridge, Antwerp, 57 m long span across the Zandvliet Lock at Port of Antwerp
- Van Cauwelaert Bridge, Antwerp, 35 m long span across the Van Cauwelaert Lock at Port of Antwerp
- Kruisschans Bridge, Antwerp, 35 m long span across the Van Cauwelaert Lock at Port of Antwerp
- Wilmarsdonk Bridge, Antwerp, 35 m span at Port of Antwerp
- Farnese Bridge, Beveren, across the Kallo Lock at Port of Antwerp
- Melsele Bridge, Beveren, across the Kallo Lock at Port of Antwerp
- Boulevard Bridge (Willebroek), Willebroek, 57 m span
- Nijverheid Bridge, Puurs
- Scheldt Bridge Bornem-Temse, Temse, 50 m span
- Scheldt Bridge Temse-Bornem, Temse, double bascule bridge, span 50m
- Herders Bridge, Bruges, 25.5 m span
- Dampoort Bridges, Bruges, both spans 20 m
- Boudewijn Bridge, Bruges
- Zelzate Bridge, Zelzate, double bascule bridge
- Schuitenier Bridge, Leuven, 12 m span

== Canada ==
- Barra Strait Bridge, crossing the Barra Strait of Bras d'Or Lake in Nova Scotia
- Johnson Street Bridge, across the Victoria Harbour Victoria, British Columbia
- Jackknife Bascule Bridge, over the Kaministiquia River in Thunder Bay, Ontario
- Bridges 1 (Lakeshore Road Bridge), 3A (Carlton Street Bridge), 4 (Homer Bridge [Queenston Road]), 6 (Flight Locks Railway Bridge for Canadian National Railways), 19 (Main Street Bridge [Port Colborne]) and 19A (Mellanby Avenue Bridge) on the Welland Canal. Save for Bridges 3A and 19A, all of these were built during the late 1920s as part of the Fourth Canal expansion project (1913-1932). Bridge 3A was built to replace the original Bridge 3, which was destroyed in an accident. Bridge 19A was constructed in the 1980s to alleviate traffic on Bridge 19 (both bridges lie on either end of Lock 8). Bridge 4 is a twin-leaf, Chicago-type bascule bridge, with its counterweights located under the road deck. All the other bascule bridges on the Welland Canal are single-leaf Rall-type bridges, with counterweights suspended on a frame structure over the roadway. Bridges 1, 3, 4, 6E, 6W, 19, and 19A are all Scherzer type rolling lift bridges, as were Bridges 7 and 9.
- La Salle Causeway lift bridge - Kingston, Ontario (Now it's replaced by a modern bridge.)
- Cherry Street Strauss Trunnion Bascule Bridge, in Toronto
- Cherry Street lift bridge over the Keating Channel, in Toronto
- CN Bridge, across the Red River, Winnipeg, Manitoba (non functional)
- Murray Street Bridge, Sydenham River, Wallaceburg, Ontario
- Dundas Street Bridge, Sydenham River, Wallaceburg, Ontario
- Lord Selkirk Bridge, Sydenham River, Wallaceburg Ontario
- King George VI lift Bridge, Kettle Creek, Port Stanley, Ontario
- Canadian National Railway, over Rideau Canal, Abbott Street, Smiths Falls, Ontario (National Historic Site)

== China ==
- Haihe Moveable Bridge, across Hai River in Tianjin
- Jiefang Bridge (Tianjin)

== Croatia ==
- Osor Bridge in Osor
- Trogir Bridge in Trogir

== Denmark ==
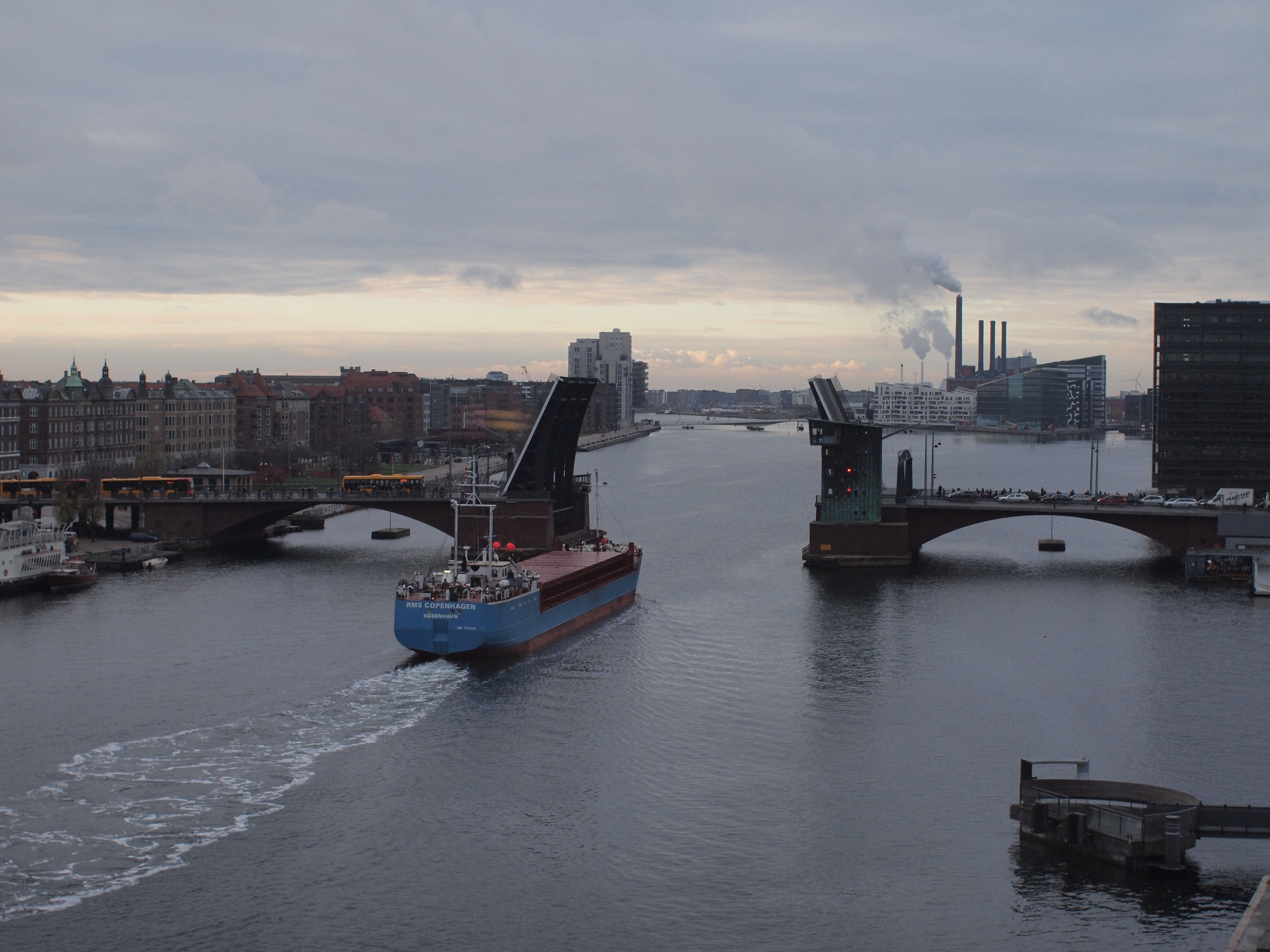
Open Langebro Bridge in Copenhagen

- Aggersund Bridge across the Aggersund
- Egernsund Bridge across the Egernsund
- Frederik IX Bridge across the Guldborgsund in Nykøbing Falster
- Guldborgsund Bridge across the Guldborgsund in Guldborg
- Knippelsbro across the Inner Harbour in Copenhagen
- Langebro across the Inner Harbour in Copenhagen
- Limfjordsbroen across the Limfjord in Aalborg
- Jernbanebroen over Limfjorden across the Limfjord in Aalborg
- Masnedsund Bridge across the Masnedsund in Vordingborg
- Oddesund Bridge across the Oddesund

== Finland ==
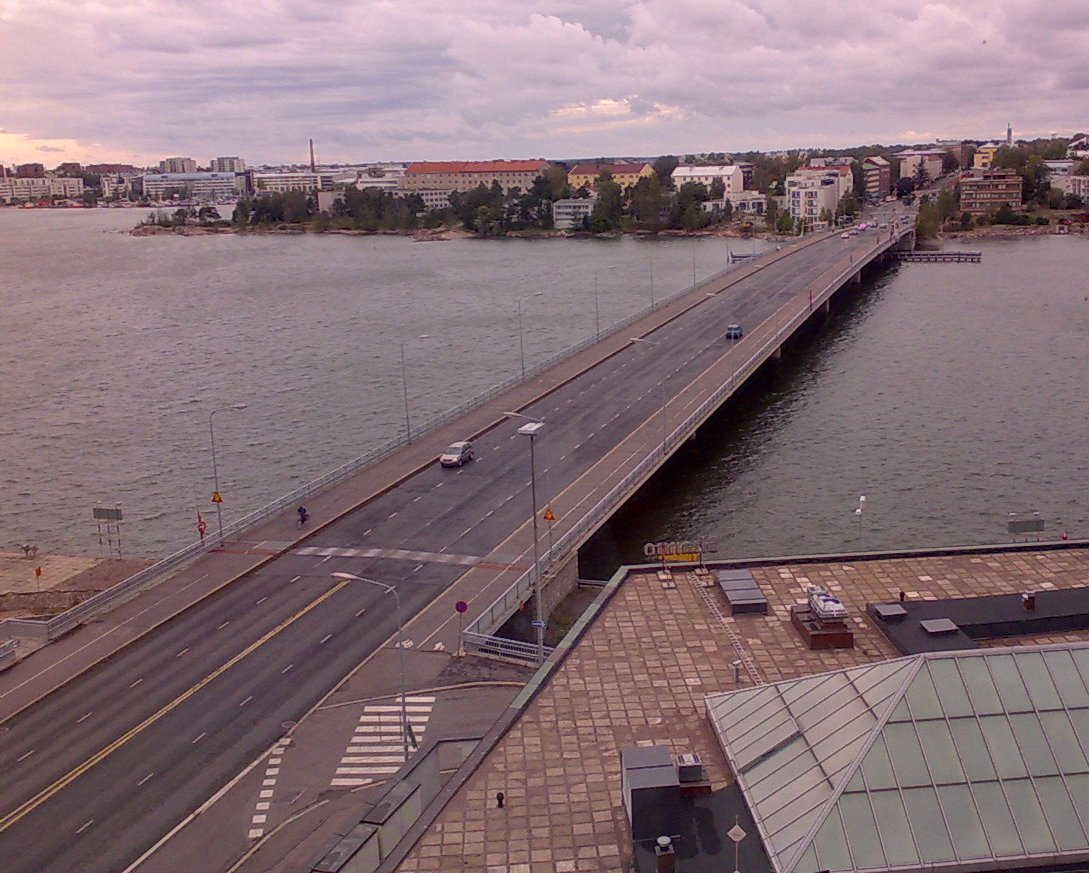
The Lauttasaari bridge

- Lauttasaari bridge in Helsinki, connecting the island of Lauttasaari to the mainland

== France ==
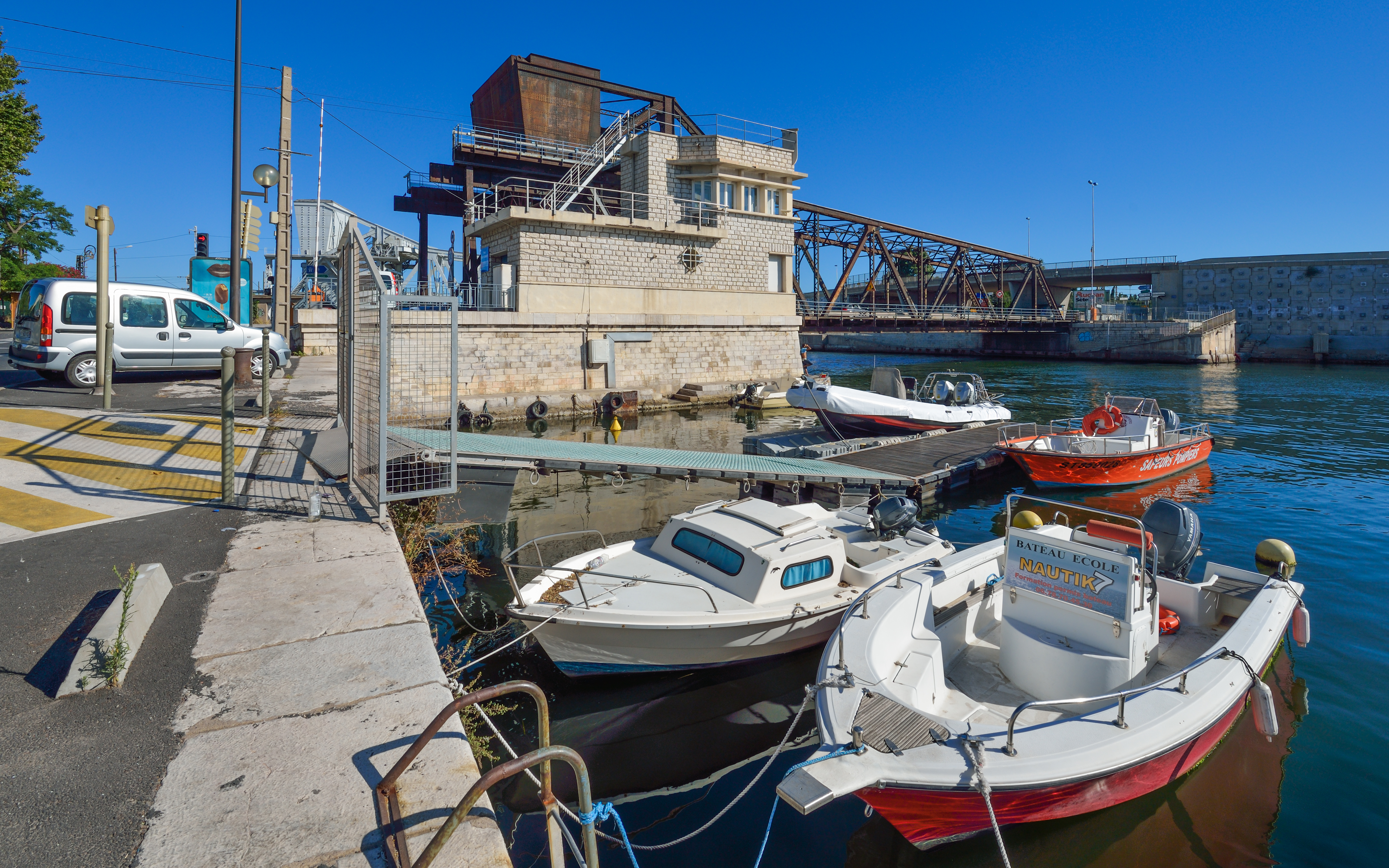
Sadi-Carnot Bridge, Sète, Hérault

- Pegasus Bridge, Ouistreham, Normandy
- Sadi-Carnot Bridge, Sète, Hérault

== Germany ==
- Bascule bridge, Potshausen, Lower Saxony, Germany
- Wolgast-Usedom Bridge, Wolgast, Mecklenburg-Vorpommern, Germany
- Wiecker Bridge, Greifswald, Mecklenburg-Vorpommern, Germany
- Lindaunis Bridge, Boren, Schleswig-Holstein, Germany

== Ireland ==
- East-Link, Dublin

== India ==
- Pamban Bridge, Rameswaram, Tamil Nadu
- Bascule bridge Kidderpore Kolkata (Calcutta), 127 years old.
- Bascule bridge at Kochi, Kerala

Syama prasad mookerjee port,kolkata

== Indonesia ==
- Batu Rusa II Bridge, Merawang, Bangka

== Japan ==
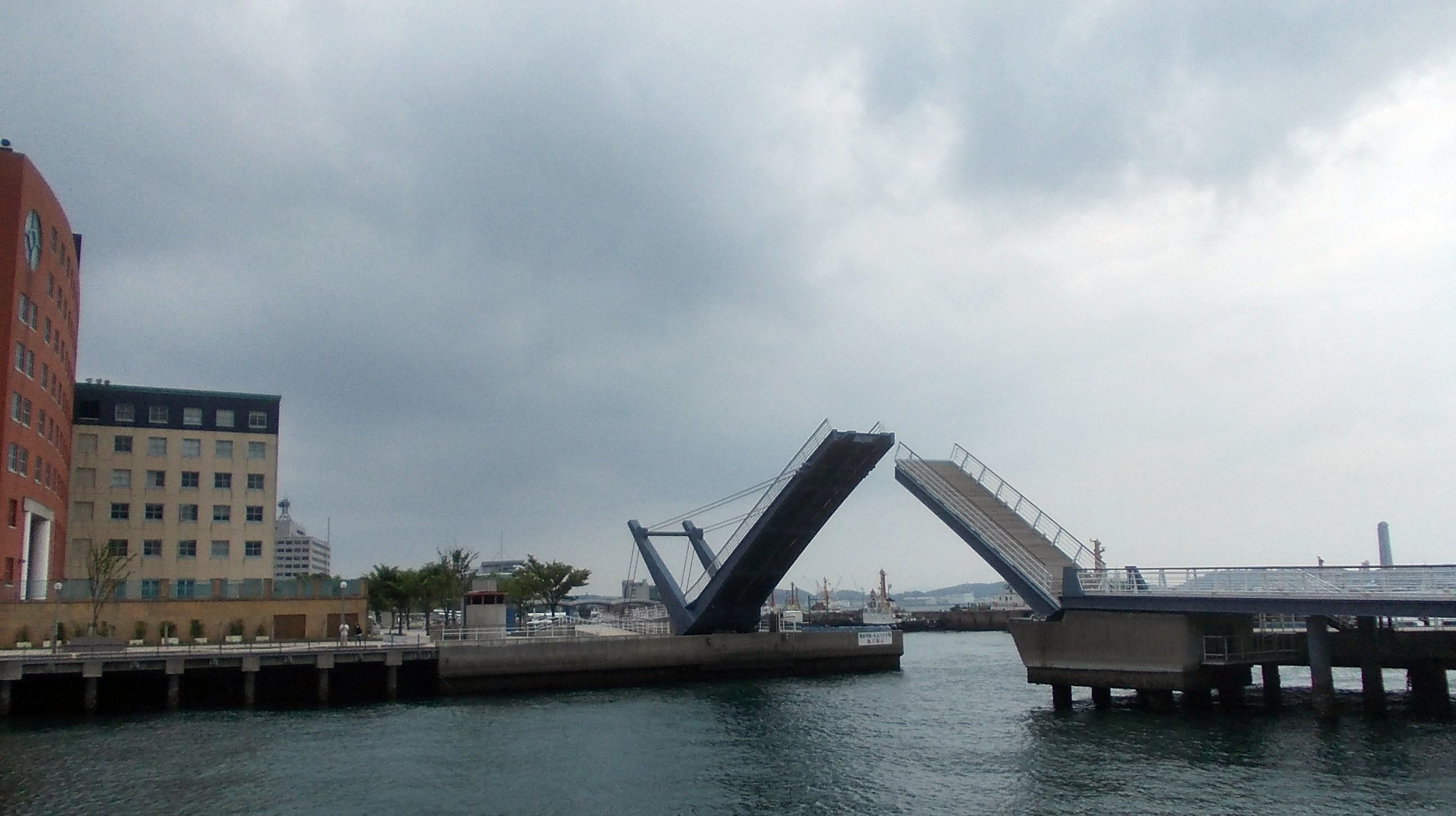
Blue Wing Moji with Shimonoseki Port in foreground at the Moji-ko Retro District, Kitakyūshū

- Blue Wing Moji, Kitakyūshū
- Nagahama Ohashi Bridge, Ōzu

== Korea ==
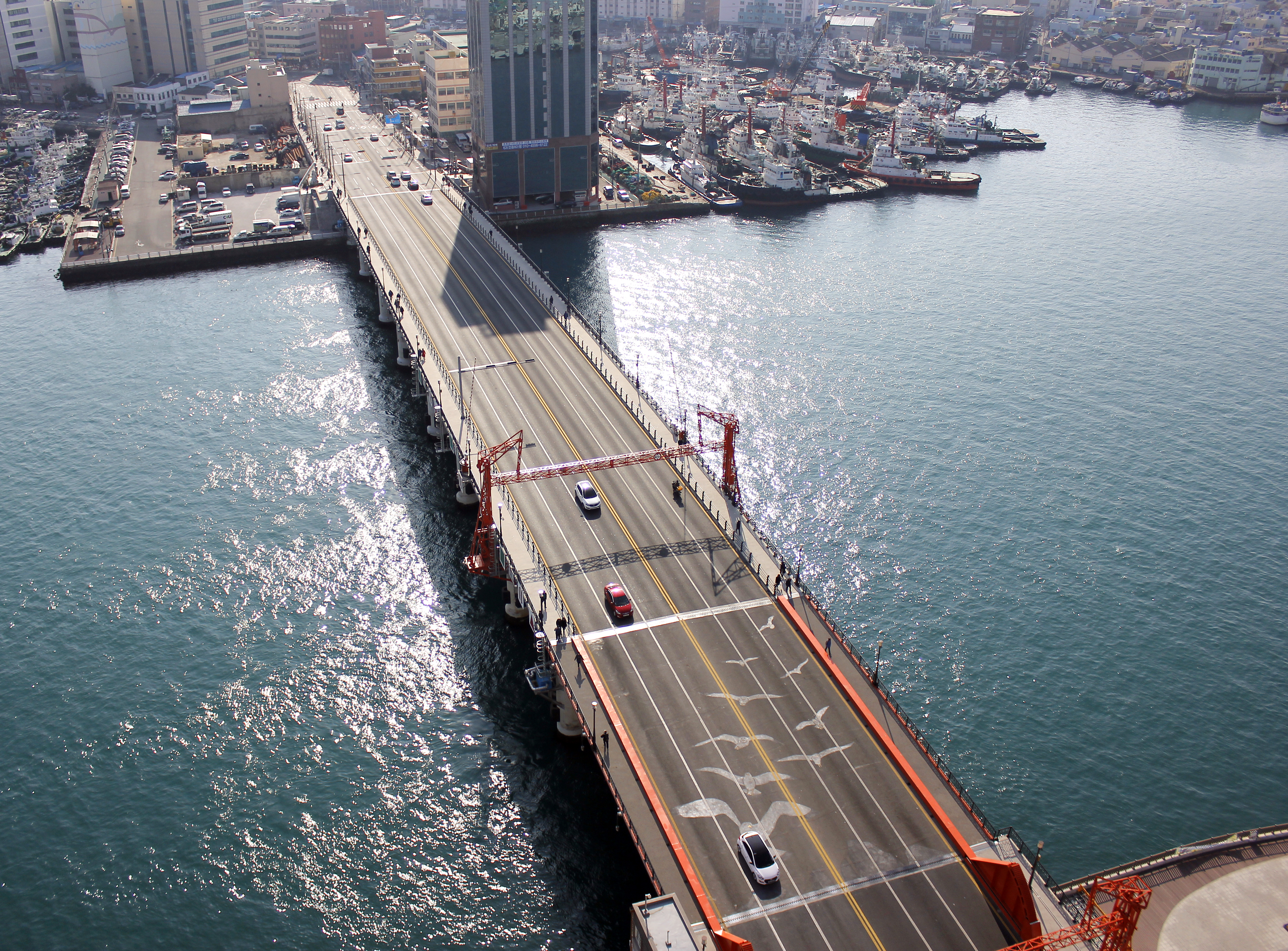
Aerial view of Yeongdo Bridge, Busan

- Yeongdo Bridge, Yeongdo, Busan

== Malaysia ==
- Kuala Terengganu Drawbridge, Kuala Terengganu, Terengganu

== Netherlands ==
Note that in Dutch basculebrug only refers to bascule bridges that have their counterweight rigidly connected to the bridge deck. If there is a hinged connection, it's referred to as ophaalbrug (literally "drawbridge"). This list lists both, and is incomplete as there are many such bridges in the Netherlands.

- Erasmusbrug, Rotterdam
- Ketelbrug, Flevoland
- Koninginnebrug, Rotterdam
- Koningin Julianabrug (Alphen aan den Rijn)
- Magere Brug, Amsterdam
- Nieuwe Amstelbrug, Amsterdam
- Overtoomse Sluis, Amsterdam (bridge no. 199)
- Scharrebiersluis, Amsterdam
- nl:Schinkelbrug, Amsterdam (bridge no. 176P, consisting of 5 parallel bridges for road, rail, and metro)
- Slauerhoffbrug, Leeuwarden
- Spinozabrug, Utrecht
- nl:Brug 360, (Théophile de Bockbrug)
- Torontobrug, Amsterdam
- Van Brienenoordbrug, Rotterdam
- nl:Westerkeersluis, Amsterdam (brug 346)
- Berlagebrug, Amsterdam

== New Zealand ==
- Te Matau ā Pohe, Whangārei
- Wynyard Crossing, Auckland

== Norway ==
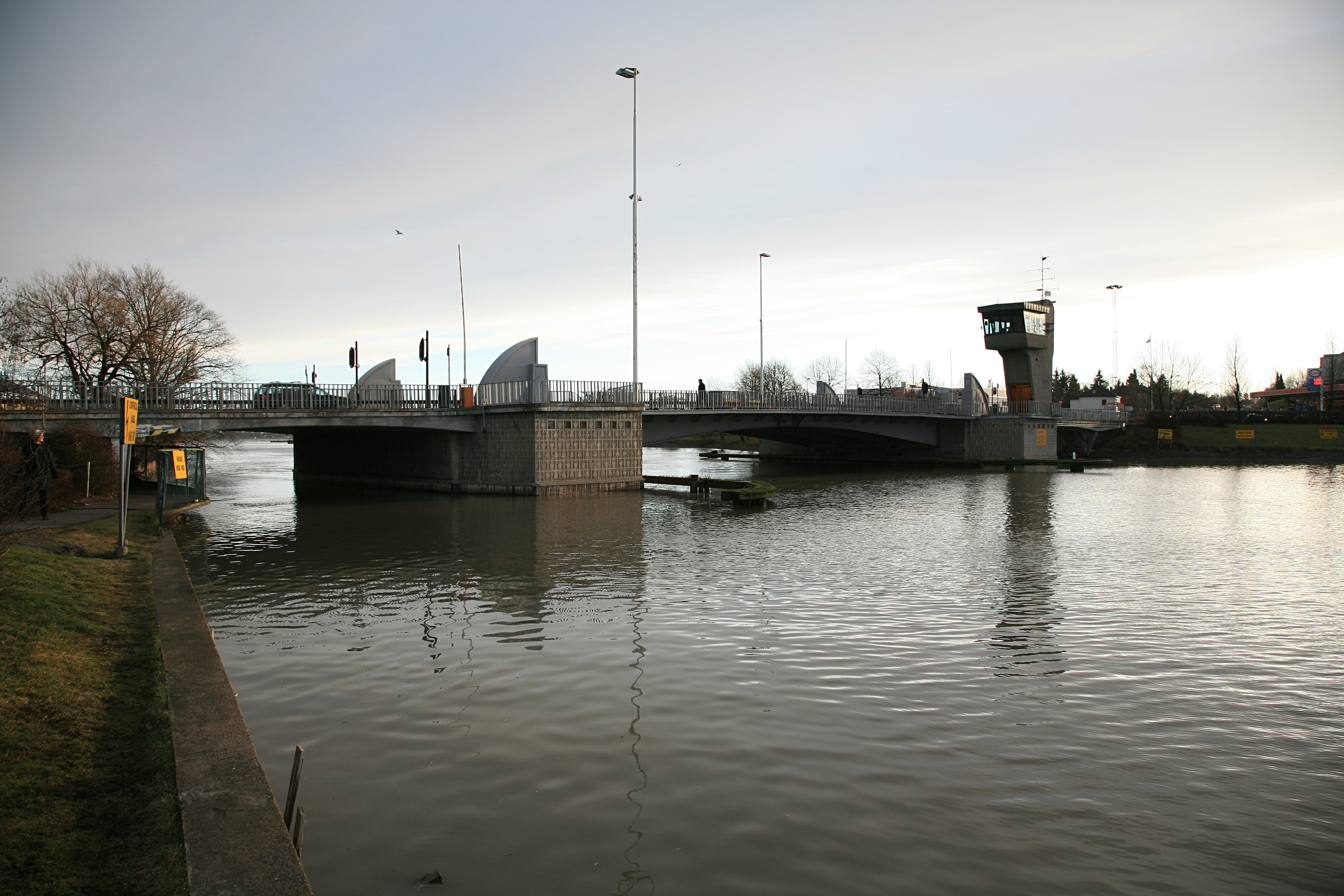
Tønsberg Canal Bridge, Tønsberg, Vestfold

- Skansen Bridge, Trondheim
- Tønsberg Canal Bridge, Tønsberg
- Strømsund bro, Kopervik

== Portugal ==
- Ponte móvel de Leça

== Russia ==
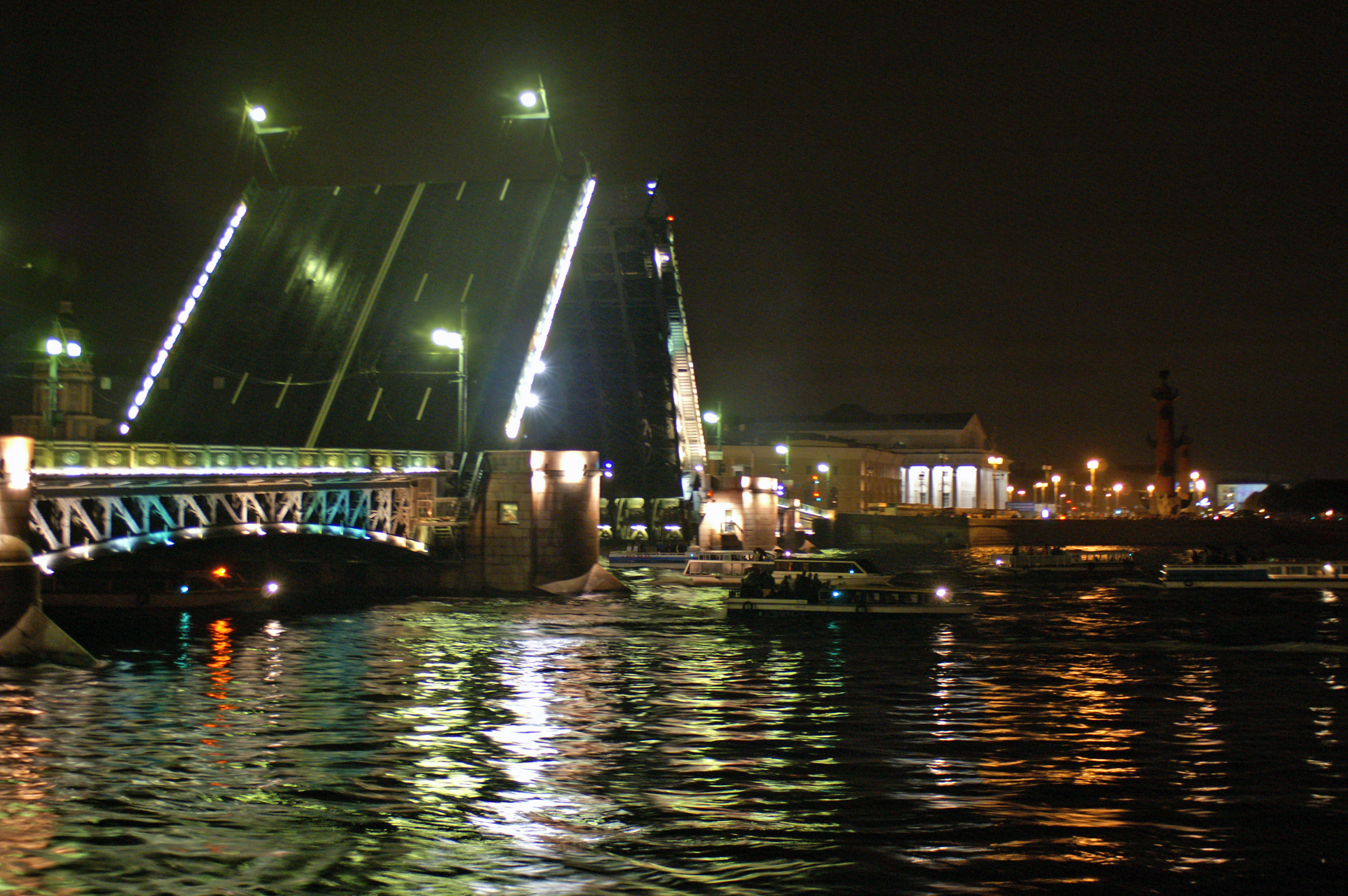
Night view of Palace Bridge is one of the most familiar images of the Northern capital of Russia

- Volodarsky Bridge in Saint Petersburg
- Finland Railway Bridge in Saint Petersburg
- Alexander Nevsky Bridge in Saint Petersburg
- Peter the Great Bridge in Saint Petersburg
- Liteyny Bridge in Saint Petersburg
- Trinity Bridge in Saint Petersburg
- Palace Bridge in Saint Petersburg
- Blagoveshchensky Bridge in Saint Petersburg
- Exchange Bridge in Saint Petersburg
- Tuchkov Bridge in Saint Petersburg
- Sampsonievsky Bridge in Saint Petersburg
- Grenader Bridge in Saint Petersburg
- Kantemirovsky Bridge in Saint Petersburg

== South Africa ==
- At the Victoria & Alfred Waterfront in Cape Town

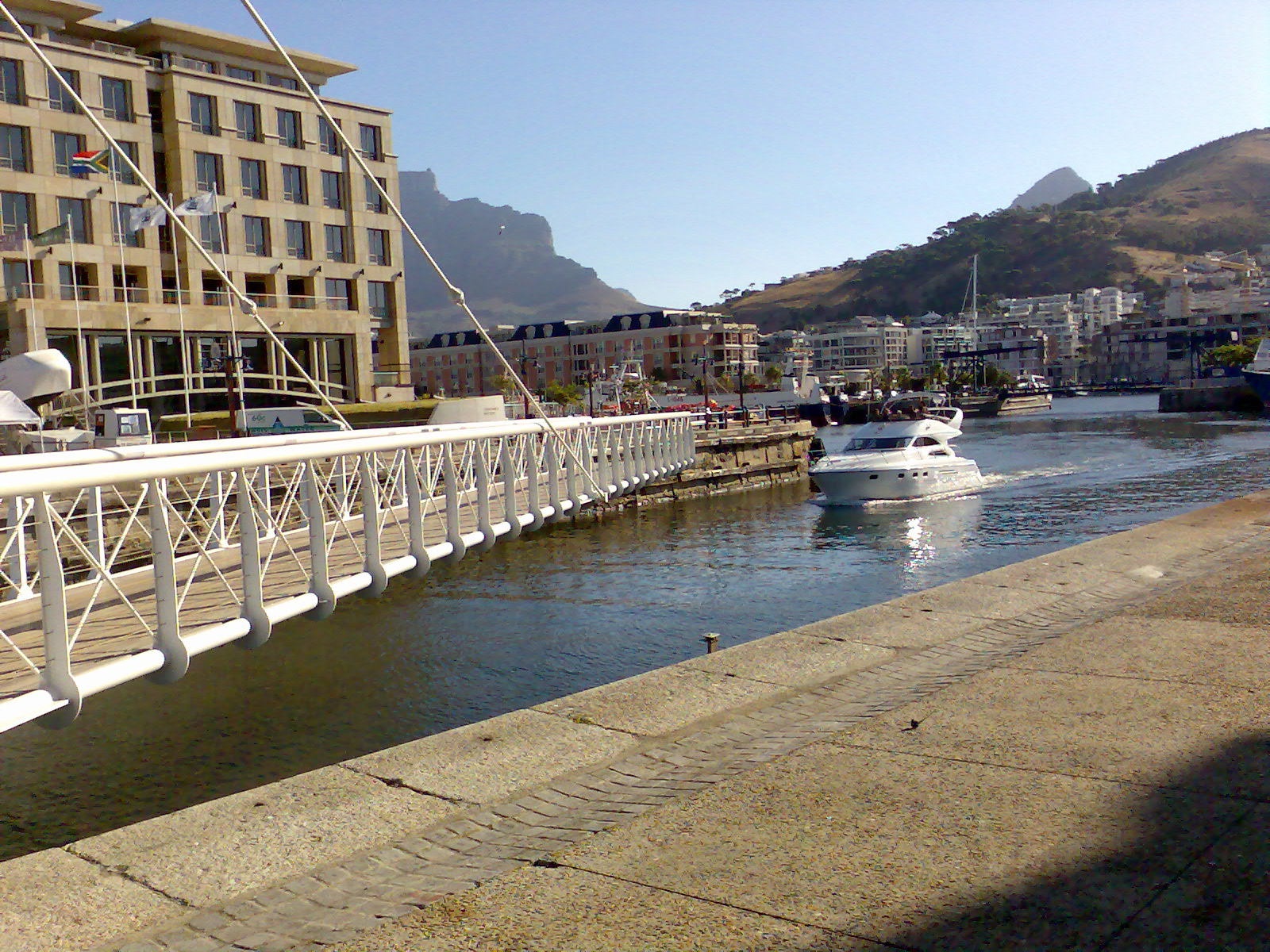
Swing bridge in foreground with bascule bridge in background at Victoria & Alfred Waterfront.

== Spain ==
- Puente de Deusto, Bilbao
- Puente del Ayuntamiento, Bilbao
- Puente de Alfonso XIII, Seville
- Puente de San Telmo, Seville
- José León de Carranza Bridge, Cádiz

== Sweden ==
- Danviksbron, Stockholm
- Skansbron, Stockholm
- Liljeholmsbron, Stockholm
- Klaffbron, Malmö
- Järnvägsbron (järnvägen Herrljunga-Uddevalla) Vänersborg

== Thailand ==
- Memorial Bridge, Bangkok
- Krungthep Bridge, Bangkok

== Turkey ==
- Galata Bridge, Istanbul

== United Kingdom ==
- Egerton Bridge, Birkenhead, Wirral
- Duke Street Bridge, Birkenhead Wirral
- Tower Road Bridge, Birkenhead, Wirral
- Corporation Bridge, Grimsby
- Bridgwater bascule bridge, Bridgwater, Somerset
- Sutton Road Bridge, Kingston upon Hull
- Drypool Bridge, Kingston upon Hull
- North Bridge, Kingston upon Hull
- Tower Bridge, London
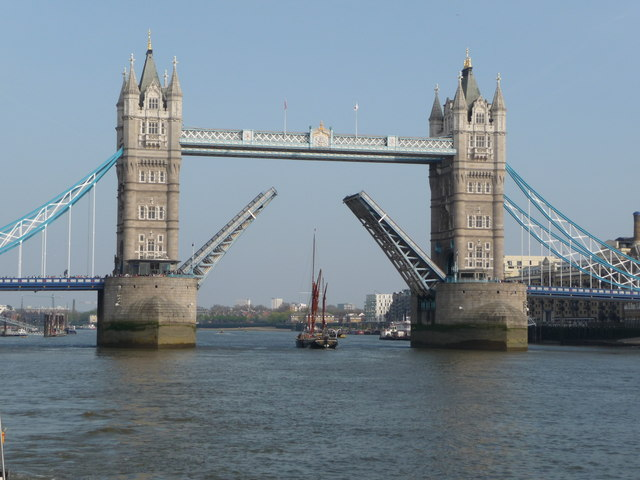
  Tower Bridge in London is one of the most famous bascule bridges in the world.
- White Cart Bridge, popularly called the Renfrew Swing Bridge (misnomer) over River Cart, Renfrew
- Breydon Bridge, Great Yarmouth
- Haven Bridge, Great Yarmouth
- Lowestoft Bascule Bridge, Suffolk
- Gull Wing Bridge, Lowestoft (due for completion 2023)
- Pero's Bridge, Bristol

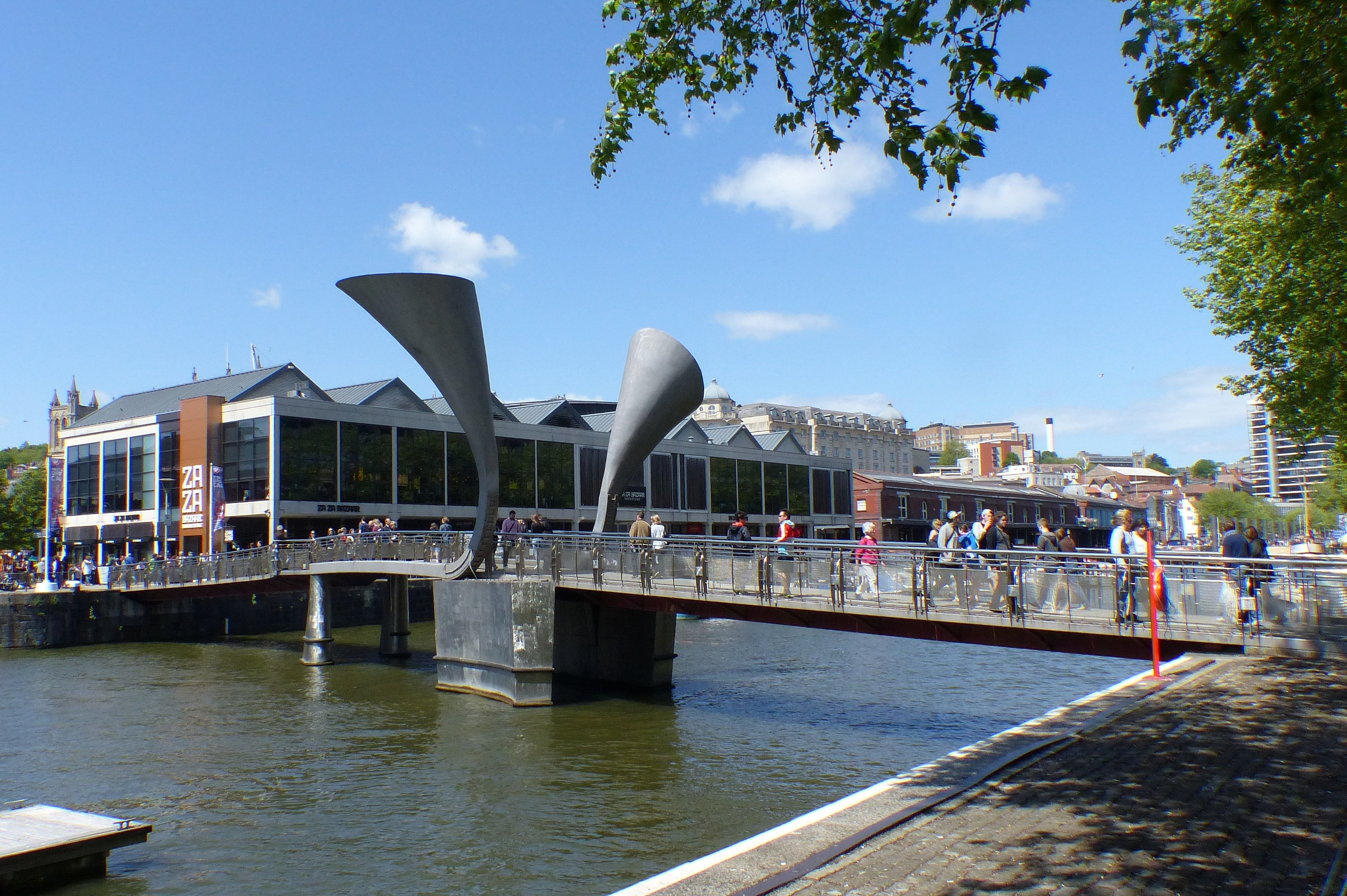
Pero's Bridge is a bascule bridge over Bristol Harbour. The two horns are counterweights to assist with opening.

- Redcliffe Bascule Bridge, Bristol
- Poole Bridge
- Twin Sails bridge, Poole, Dorset
- Town Bridge, across Weymouth Harbour, Dorset
- Countess Wear Bascule Bridge, Exeter Canal, Exeter
- River Bann Rail Bridge, Coleraine, Northern Ireland
- King George V Bridge, Keadby
- Walney Bridge, Barrow-in-Furness
- Stanley Dock, Liverpool
- Shadwell Basin Bridge, Shadwell, London
- Greenland Dock Bridge, Rotherhithe, London
- Surrey Basin Bridge, Rotherhithe, London
- The "White" Bridge, Carmarthen [Railway Bridge]
- Bann Bridge, Coleraine, County Londonderry, Northern Ireland
- Michaelson Road Bridge

== United States ==
(Alphabetical by state)

- Isleton Bridge, near Isleton, California
- Lefty O'Doul Bridge, San Francisco, California
- Park Street Bridge, Oakland, California
- High Street Bridge, Oakland, California
- Mystic River Bascule Bridge, Mystic, Connecticut
- Pequonnock River Railroad Bridge, Bridgeport, Connecticut
- Niantic River Railroad Bridge, East Lyme & Waterford, Connecticut
- Mianus River Railroad Bridge, Greenwich, Connecticut
- Housatonic River Railroad Bridge, Milford & Stratford, Connecticut
- Washington Bridge, US Route 1, Milford & Stratford, Connecticut
- Thames River Railroad Bridge, New London, Connecticut (bascule replaced by lift span 2008)
- Amtrak Old Saybrook–Old Lyme Bridge, Old Saybrook & Old Lyme, Connecticut
- Saugatuck River Railroad Bridge, Westport, Connecticut
- Market Street Bridge, Wilmington, Delaware
- Highway 204 Bridge (or Skidaway Bridge), Isle of Hope, Georgia
- Causton Bluff Bridge, Savannah, Georgia
- Norfolk and Southern train trestle over the Savannah River, Augusta Georgia
- Various bridges across the Intracoastal Waterway in Florida
- FEC Strauss Trunnion Bascule Bridge in Jacksonville, Florida'
- Various bridges over the Intercostal Waterway in Florida
- Carlin White Bridge over Jupiter Inlet in Jupiter, Florida
- Beach Road Bridge Over Jupiter Inlet in Jupiter, Florida
- Various bridges across the Miami River in Miami, Florida
- Almost 40 in Chicago, Illinois, mostly across the Chicago River (and its north branch), but a few crossing the Calumet River. Examples include the following, among others:
  - Deering Bridge over North Branch of the Chicago River
  - Ashland Avenue Bridge over North Branch of the Chicago River
  - Webster Avenue Bridge over North Branch of the Chicago River
  - Cortland Street Bridge over North Branch of the Chicago River
  - Z-6 Railroad Bridge over North Branch of the Chicago River
  - Z-2 Cherry Avenue Railroad Bridge over North Branch of the Chicago River
  - Division Street Bridge over North Branch of the Chicago River
  - North Halsted Street Bridge over North Branch of the Chicago River
  - Chicago Avenue Bridge over North Branch of the Chicago River
  - Ohio Street Bridge over North Branch of the Chicago River
  - Grand Avenue Bridge over North Branch of the Chicago River
  - Kinzie Street Bridge over North Branch of the Chicago River
  - Kinzie Street C&NW Railroad Bridge over North Branch of the Chicago River
  - Franklin-Orleans Avenue Bridge over Main Stem of the Chicago River
  - Wells Street Bridge over Main Stem of the Chicago River
  - LaSalle Street Bridge over Main Stem of the Chicago River
  - Clark Street Bridge over Main Stem of the Chicago River
  - Dearborn Street Bridge over Main Stem of the Chicago River
  - State Street Bridge over Main Stem of the Chicago River
  - Wabash Avenue Bridge over Main Stem of the Chicago River
  - Michigan Avenue Bridge over Main Stem of the Chicago River
  - Columbus Drive Bridge over Main Stem of the Chicago River
  - Lake Shore Drive Bridge over Main Stem of the Chicago River
  - Lake Street Bridge over South Branch of the Chicago River
  - Randolph Street Bridge over South Branch of the Chicago River
  - Washington Boulevard Bridge over South Branch of the Chicago River
  - Madison Street Bridge over South Branch of the Chicago River
  - Monroe Street Bridge over South Branch of the Chicago River
  - Adams Street Bridge over South Branch of the Chicago River
  - Jackson Boulevard Bridge over South Branch of the Chicago River
  - Van Buren Street Bridge over South Branch of the Chicago River
  - Congress Parkway Bridge over South Branch of the Chicago River
  - Harrison Street Bridge over South Branch of the Chicago River
  - Roosevelt Road Bridge over South Branch of the Chicago River
  - B&O Railroad Chicago Terminal Bridge over South Branch of the Chicago River
  - St. Charles Air Line Railroad Bridge over South Branch of the Chicago River
  - 18th Street Bridge over South Branch of the Chicago River
  - Canal Street Railroad Bridge (aka Railroad Bridge #458) over South Branch of the Chicago River
  - Canal Street Bridge over South Branch of the Chicago River
  - Cermak Road Bridge over South Branch of the Chicago River
  - South Halsted Street Bridge over South Branch of the Chicago River
  - Loomis Street Bridge over South Branch of the Chicago River
  - Chicago & Alton Railroad Bridge over South Branch of the Chicago River
  - Ashland Avenue Bridge over Chicago Sanitary & Ship Canal
  - Western Avenue Bridge over Chicago Sanitary & Ship Canal
  - 8 Track Railroad Bridge over Chicago Sanitary & Ship Canal
  - California Avenue Bridge over Chicago Sanitary & Ship Canal
  - Chicago & Illinois Western Railroad Bridge over Chicago Sanitary & Ship Canal
  - Chicago Madison & Northern Railroad Bridge over Chicago Sanitary & Ship Canal
  - Santa Fe Railroad Bridge over Chicago Sanitary & Ship Canal
  - BRC Sanitary & Ship Canal Bridge over Chicago Sanitary & Ship Canal
  - Cicero Avenue Bridge over Chicago Sanitary & Ship Canal
  - Harlem Avenue Bridge over Chicago Sanitary & Ship Canal
  - Elgin Joliet & Eastern Railroad Bridge#710 over Calumet River
  - Ewing Avenue Bridge over Calumet River
  - 95th Street Bridge over Calumet River
  - Pittsburgh Fort Wayne & Chicago Railroad Bridge#1 over Calumet River
  - Pittsburgh Fort Wayne & Chicago Railroad Bridge #2 over Calumet River
  - Lake Shore & Michigan Southern Railroad Bridge#1 over Calumet River
  - Lake Shore & Michigan Southern Railroad Bridge#2 over Calumet River
  - Baltimore & Ohio Chicago Terminal Railroad Bridge over Calumet River
  - 100th Street Bridge over Calumet River
  - 106th Street Bridge over Calumet River
  - Chicago & Western Indiana Railroad Bridge over Calumet River
  - Torrence Avenue Bridge over Calumet River
  - Nickel Plate Road Railroad Bridge over Calumet River
  - Indiana Harbor Belt Bridge over Grand Calumet River
- Six movable bridges are found in Joliet, Illinois:
  - Ruby Street Bridge, [Chicago Style Bascule]
  - Jackson Street Bridge, [Scherzer Rolling Lift Bascule]
  - Cass Street Bridge, [Scherzer Rolling Lift Bascule]
  - Jefferson Street Bridge, [Scherzer Rolling Lift Bascule]
  - McDonough Street Bridge, [Scherzer Rolling Lift Bascule]
  - Brandon Road Bridge, [Rail Height Bascule]
- Joe Page Bridge over Illinois River, Calhoun County, Illinois
- Franklin Street Bridge, Michigan City, Indiana
- St. Claude Avenue Bridge, New Orleans, Louisiana
- Maestri Bridge, between New Orleans, Louisiana and Slidell, Louisiana
- Lake Pontchartrain Causeway on Lake Pontchartrain in Louisiana
- Million Dollar Bridge (Maine), Portland, Maine (demolished, replaced by next entry)
- Casco Bay Bridge, Portland, Maine
- Hanover Street Bridge, Baltimore, Maryland
- Knapp's Narrows Drawbridge, Tilghman Island, Maryland
- Draw One, Boston, Massachusetts
- Congress Street Bascule Bridge, Boston, Massachusetts, a Strauss bascule over the Fort Point Channel
- Andrew P. McArdle Memorial Bridge, Boston, Massachusetts
- Brightman Street Bridge, Fall River, Massachusetts
- Veterans Memorial Bridge, Fall River, Massachusetts
- Eel Pond Bridge, Woods Hole, Massachusetts
- Independence Bridge, Bay City, Michigan
- Lafayette Avenue Bridge, Bay City, Michigan
- Liberty Bridge, Bay City, Michigan
- Veterans Memorial Bridge, Bay City, Michigan
- Bicentennial Bridge connecting Benton Harbor and St. Joseph, Michigan
- Blossomland Bridge connecting Benton Harbor and St. Joseph, Michigan
- US 31–Island Lake Outlet Bridge, Charlevoix, Michigan
- Cheboygan Bascule Bridge, Cheboygan, Michigan
- US-31 Bascule Bridge spanning the Grand River connecting Grand Haven and Spring Lake
- Maple Street Bridge, Manistee, Michigan
- Cypress Street Bridge, Manistee, Michigan
- Pere Marquette Railroad Bridge, Port Huron, Michigan
- Dyckman Avenue Bridge, spanning the Black River, South Haven, Michigan
- CN Ranier Bridge, Rainy River, Ranier, Minnesota
- Bascule Bridge, John C. Stennis Space Center, Mississippi
- Bascule Bridge, Pascagoula River, Mississippi
- Neil Underwood Bridge, Hampton, New Hampshire
- Thomas A. Mathis Bridge spanning Barnegat Bay and Pelican Island between Toms River, New Jersey and Seaside Heights, New Jersey
- Ferry Street Bridge, Buffalo, New York
- Bruckner Boulevard and Expressway (I-278), Bronx, New York City, New York (With separate northbound and southbound spans for the boulevard and for I-278, this "bridge" is in reality four double-leaf bascule bridges.)
- Pelham Bay Railroad Bridge, Bronx, New York City, New York
- Pelham Bridge, Bronx, New York City, New York
- Col. Patrick O'Rorke Bridge in Rochester, New York
- Alfred Cunningham Memorial Bridge, New Bern, North Carolina
- Pasquotank River Bridge, Elizabeth City, North Carolina
- CSX Transportation Bridge, Wilmington, North Carolina
- Ashtabula lift bridge, Ashtabula, Ohio
- Charles Berry Bridge, Lorain, Ohio
- Port Clinton Lift Bridge, Port Clinton, Ohio
- Craig Memorial Bridge, Toledo, Ohio
- Lewis and Clark River Bridge, near Astoria, Oregon
- Old Youngs Bay Bridge, Astoria, Oregon
- Siuslaw River Bridge, Florence, Oregon
- Broadway Bridge, Portland, Oregon
- Burnside Bridge, Portland, Oregon
- Morrison Bridge, Portland, Oregon
- Passyunk Avenue Bridge, Philadelphia, Pennsylvania
- Tacony–Palmyra Bridge, Philadelphia, Pennsylvania
- University Avenue Bridge, Philadelphia, Pennsylvania
- Crook Point Bascule Bridge, Providence, Rhode Island
- Washington Bridge, Providence, Rhode Island
- Wappoo Creek Bridge, James Island, South Carolina
- John Ross Bridge (Commonly called Market Street Bridge), Chattanooga, Tennessee.
- Berkley Bridge, Norfolk, Virginia
- First Avenue South Bridge, Seattle, Washington
- Montlake Bridge, Seattle, Washington
- University Bridge, Seattle, Washington
- Fremont Bridge, Seattle, Washington
- Ballard Bridge, Seattle, Washington
- Salmon Bay Bridge, Seattle, Washington
- Ray Nitschke Memorial Bridge, Green Bay, Wisconsin
- Main Street Bridge (Racine, Wisconsin), Racine, Wisconsin
- South 8th Street Bridge, Sheboygan, Wisconsin (single leaf)
- Sturgeon Bay Bridge (Michigan Street Bridge), Sturgeon Bay, Wisconsin
- Arlington Memorial Bridge, Virginia – Washington D.C.
- Woodrow Wilson Bridge, Alexandria, Virginia – Washington, D.C. - Prince George's County, Maryland
