= List of crossings of the Chicago River =

This is a list of crossings of the Chicago River. The list proceeds upstream following the modern drainage pattern.

== South Branch ==
Image	Crossing	Location	Opened	Coordinates	Notes
Becomes Chicago Sanitary and Ship Canal
	Damen Avenue	Lower West Side			
	Ashland Avenue	Lower West Side			
	Loomis Street	Lower West Side–Bridgeport			
	Halsted Street	Lower West Side–Bridgeport			
	I-90 (Dan Ryan Expressway)	Lower West Side–Bridgeport			
	Cermak Road Bridge	Lower West Side–Chinatown			
	Canal Street	Lower West Side–Chinatown			
	Canal Street Railroad Bridge	Lower West Side–Chinatown	1914	41.8556°N 87.637°W	
	18th Street	Lower West Side–Chinatown			
	St. Charles Air Line Bridge	Near West Side–South Loop	1919	41.8608°N 87.6344°W	
	Roosevelt Road	Near West Side–South Loop			
	Harrison Street Bridge	Near West Side–South Loop	1960	41.8744°N 87.6361°W	
	Congress Parkway Bridge; Ida B. Wells Drive	Near West Side–South Loop	1956	41.87564°N 87.63667°W	
	Van Buren Street Bridge	Near West Side–Chicago Loop	1956	41.8768°N 87.6374°W	
	Jackson Boulevard Bridge	Near West Side–Chicago Loop	1915	41.88°N 87.64°W	
	Adams Street Bridge	Near West Side–Chicago Loop		41.87934°N 87.63809°W	
	Monroe Street Bridge	Near West Side–Chicago Loop		41.88°N 87.64°W	
	Madison Street Bridge (Lyric Opera Bridge)	Near West Side–Chicago Loop	1922	41.882°N 87.638°W	
	Washington Boulevard Bridge	Near West Side–Chicago Loop		41.883°N 87.638°W	
	Randolph Street Bridge	Near West Side–Chicago Loop		41.88°N 87.64°W	
	Lake Street Bridge; CTA Green Line and Pink Line	Near West Side–Chicago Loop		41.886°N 87.638°W	
Splits into Main Stem and North Branch

== Main Stem ==
Image	Crossing	Location	Opened	Coordinates	Notes
	Franklin Street Bridge	River North–Chicago Loop	1920	41.8872°N 87.6358°W	
	Wells Street Bridge	River North–Chicago Loop	1922	41.8875°N 87.6339°W	
	La Salle Street Bridge	River North–Chicago Loop	1928	41.8875°N 87.6325°W	
	Clark Street Bridge	River North–Chicago Loop	1929	41.8875°N 87.631°W	
	Dearborn Street Bridge	River North–Chicago Loop	1962	41.8875°N 87.6295°W	
	State Street Bridge	River North–Chicago Loop	1949	41.8875°N 87.628°W	
	State Street Subway Tunnel	River North–Chicago Loop			
	Wabash Avenue Bridge	River North–Chicago Loop	1930	41.8879°N 87.6268°W	
	DuSable Bridge; Michigan Avenue	River North–Chicago Loop	1920	41.88886°N 87.62436°W	
	Columbus Drive	River North–Streeterville			
	Outer Drive Bridge; US 41 (Lake Shore Drive)	River North–Streeterville	1937	41.8884°N 87.6141°W	
	Chicago Harbor Lock	River North–Streeterville	1938	41.8884°N 87.6064°W	
Inflow from Lake Michigan

== North Branch ==
Image	Crossing	Location	Opened	Coordinates	Notes
	Kinzie Street Railroad Bridge	West Town–Near North Side	1908	41.8885°N 87.6392°W	
	Kinzie Street Bridge	West Town–Near North Side	1909	41.8890675°N 87.6394027°W	
	Grand Avenue Bridge	West Town–Near North Side	1913	41.8914°N 87.6411°W	
	Ohio Street	West Town–Near North Side			
	Chicago Avenue Bridge	West Town–Near North Side			
	Halsted Street	West Town–Near North Side			
	Division Street	West Town–Near North Side			
	North Avenue Bridge; IL 64 (North Avenue)	West Town–Near North Side	2008	41.9108°N 87.6569°W	
	Cortland Street Drawbridge	Logan Square–Lincoln Park	1902	41.917°N 87.664°W	
	Webster Avenue	Logan Square–Lincoln Park			
	Ashland Avenue	Logan Square–Lincoln Park			
	Union Pacific North Line	Logan Square–Lincoln Park			
	Fullerton Avenue	Logan Square–Lincoln Park			
	Damen Avenue	Logan Square–Lincoln Park			
	Diversey Parkway	Logan Square–Lincoln Park			
	Western Avenue	Avondale–North Center			
	Belmont Avenue	Avondale–North Center			
	Addison Street	Avondale–North Center			
	312 RiverRun	Avondale–North Center			
	IL 19 (Irving Park Road)	Avondale–North Center			
	Montrose Avenue				
	Wilson Avenue				
	CTA Brown Line				
	Lawrence Avenue				
	Argyle Street				
