= Madison Street Bridge =

Madison Street Bridge may refer to:

- Madison Street Bridge (Chicago), a crossing of the Chicago River
- Madison Street Bridge (Portland, Oregon), the name of two former bridges over the Willamette River
