= Main Street Bridge (Racine, Wisconsin) =

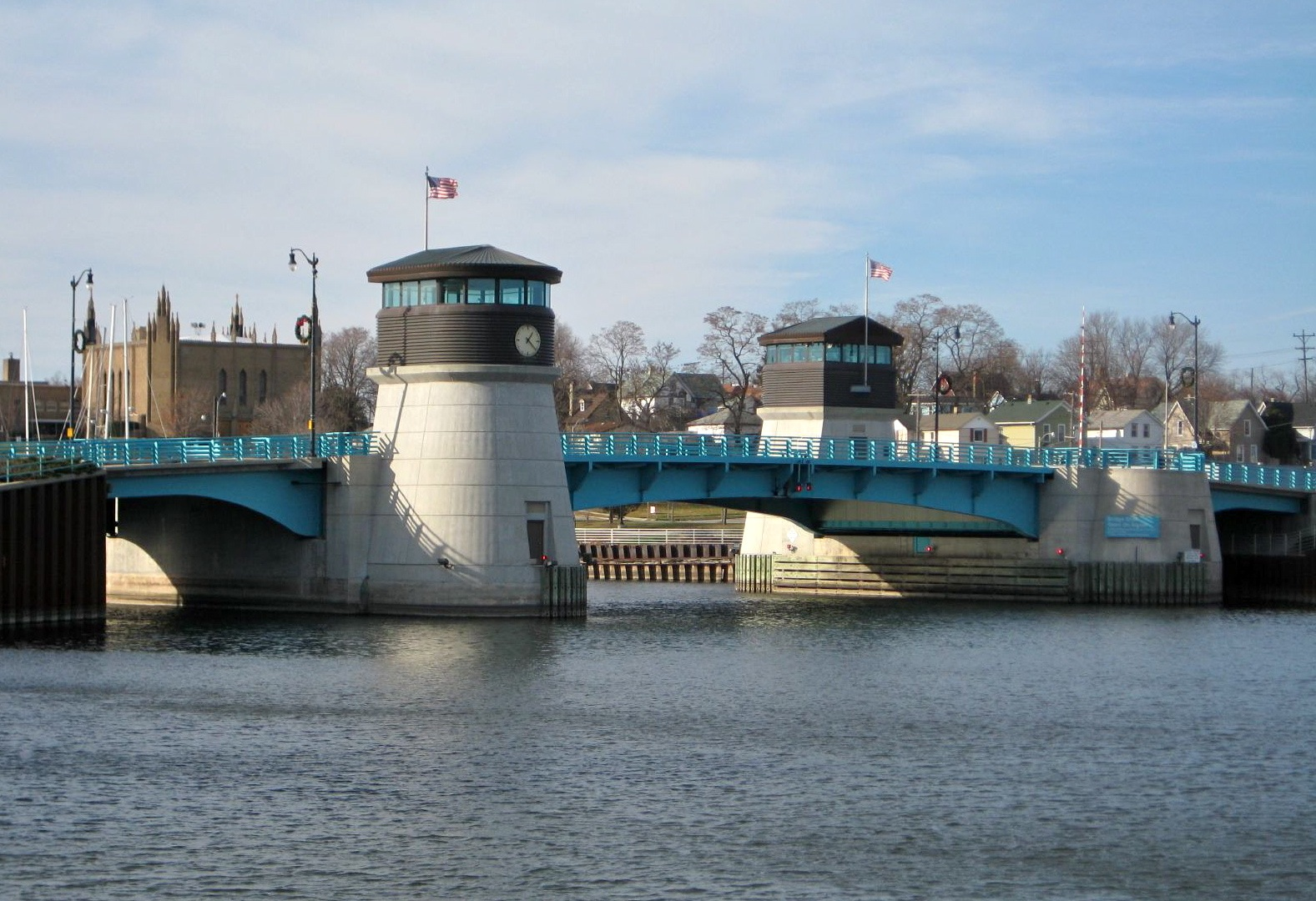
- Coordinates: 42°44′02″N 87°47′05″W
- Crosses: Root River
- Locale: Racine, Wisconsin
- Maintained by: Wisconsin Department of Transportation

Characteristics
- Design: double-leaf bascule
- Width: about
- Height: 19
- No. of lanes: 2 northbound, 2 southbound, 2 pedestrian

History
- Constructed by: Lunda Construction Co.
- Construction start: July 1, 1996
- Construction end: November 1996
- Opened: November 22, 1996
- Replaces: Main Street Bridge 1928

Location
- Interactive map outlining the Main Street Bridge

The Main Street Bridge is a double-leafed bascule bridge in Racine, Wisconsin that carries Main Street over the Root River, connecting downtown Racine to the north side of the city, where it becomes North Main Street. The bridge is the last to cross the Root River before it enters Lake Michigan, and its two spans can be lifted to allow ships to enter the river. Along with the State Street Bridge, it is one of two bridges connecting these areas. The first Main Street bridge was built in 1838 and was destroyed in a flood in 1843. The next bridge at Main Street was not built until 1876. The bridge was replaced in 1907, 1928, and most recently in 1996, when the current structure was built.

== History ==
The first fixed crossing of the Root River in Racine was built at the location of Main Street in 1838, after the funding was authorized by Wisconsin governor Henry Dodge two years prior. This bridge was washed away during a storm in spring 1843, and another bridge was not constructed at the site until 1876. Until then, travelers crossed the river by ferry, or on a rickety pedestrian bridge in the approximate location of the current State Street Bridge.

== First swing bridge, 1876–1906 ==
Major Ira C. Paine was one of the strongest advocates for the construction of a Main Street bridge. In 1862, he later wrote that he had "procured the passage of a law to enable the City Council to erect such a bridge," but the bridge was not built for several years. Beginning in 1873, he wrote a series of editorials in the Racine County Argus arguing that the lack of a convenient Root River crossing was holding back Racine's development. By 1875, the Racine city council was debating whether and where to build a railroad and pedestrian bridge across the river. An editorial in the Argus accused some of the aldermen of opposing the bridge because the cost of building and maintaining it would raise their taxes, and also alleged that some aldermen were deliberately advocating for the bridge to be built in an inconvenient location to prevent it from actually being built.

An iron swing bridge was ultimately built at Main Street for $10,690, with construction beginning in 1876. Although editorials in the Racine Journal raised concerns about the quality of the ongoing construction in February 1877, the finished bridge was approved by Milwaukee inspectors N. B. Lord and W. H. Keeper in May. In 1882, the Racine Journal wrote that the bridge was indeed poorly constructed, finding among other things that the swing mechanism no longer worked as intended and the bridge had to be pried open with a crowbar when ships passed.

== Second swing bridge, 1907–1927 ==
By 1906, the thirty-year-old swing bridge was clearly inadequate and was described as "dilapidated". While some suggested that a new swing bridge should be built to replace it, others, such as Frank J. Becker, argued that swing bridges had become obsolete with the introduction of bascule bridges, which did not require a pier in the middle of the river and thus created less obstruction to passing ships. The push for a new bridge was successful, although the city decided to build a new swing bridge rather than a bascule bridge, contracting Edward Gillen Construction Company of Milwaukee to do the job. The old bridge was demolished later that year, with a temporary pontoon bridge built for pedestrians to use until the new bridge was finished. In September, it was reported that labor strikes, problems with the supply of West Coast timber, and a severe storm caused by remnants of the 1906 Mississippi hurricane all delayed construction of the new bridge.

The new bridge was scheduled to open on February 20, 1907, but the final stages of construction faced unexpected delays. One frustrated resident wrote to the Racine Journal that "the people of the north side have been more than patient, but some day they will rise in their wrath and some one will suffer." The bridge ultimately opened on March 10.

== First bascule bridge, 1928–1996 ==
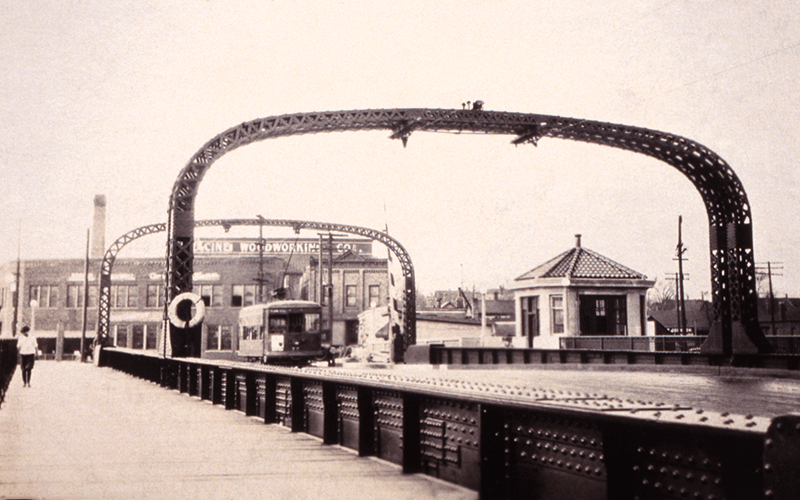
A northbound streetcar passes under the arched trolley wire supports as it crosses Racine's new Main Street drawbridge on May 3, 1928. The car ran up Main Street to High Street, then west to Douglas Avenue. The car returned through downtown, and ran on 14th Street to reach the Racine Junction railroad station on Junction Avenue & 17th Street. This route served neighborhood shopping districts, businesses, and residential areas.

A 1937 aerial image of the bridge, showing the diagonal jog the street made at the bridge's north end.

In the summer of 1926, the city of Racine proposed replacing the existing swing bridge with a bascule bridge. Edward Gillen Construction Company, the Milwaukee contractor which had built the existing bridge twenty years prior, was the lowest bidder, but the bids were later thrown out because city officials believed the bridge could be built more cheaply after the price of structural iron fell. The following year, in March 1927, the city held a new round of bidding, and Gillen was again the lowest bidder, offering to build a bascule bridge in 365 days for $305,227. The bid was accepted and the bridge was closed for demolition on April 7. City officials were unable to build a temporary pontoon bridge replacement as they had in 1906, because federal regulations no longer allowed river navigation to be obstructed in this way, and all traffic was required to detour through the State Street Bridge.

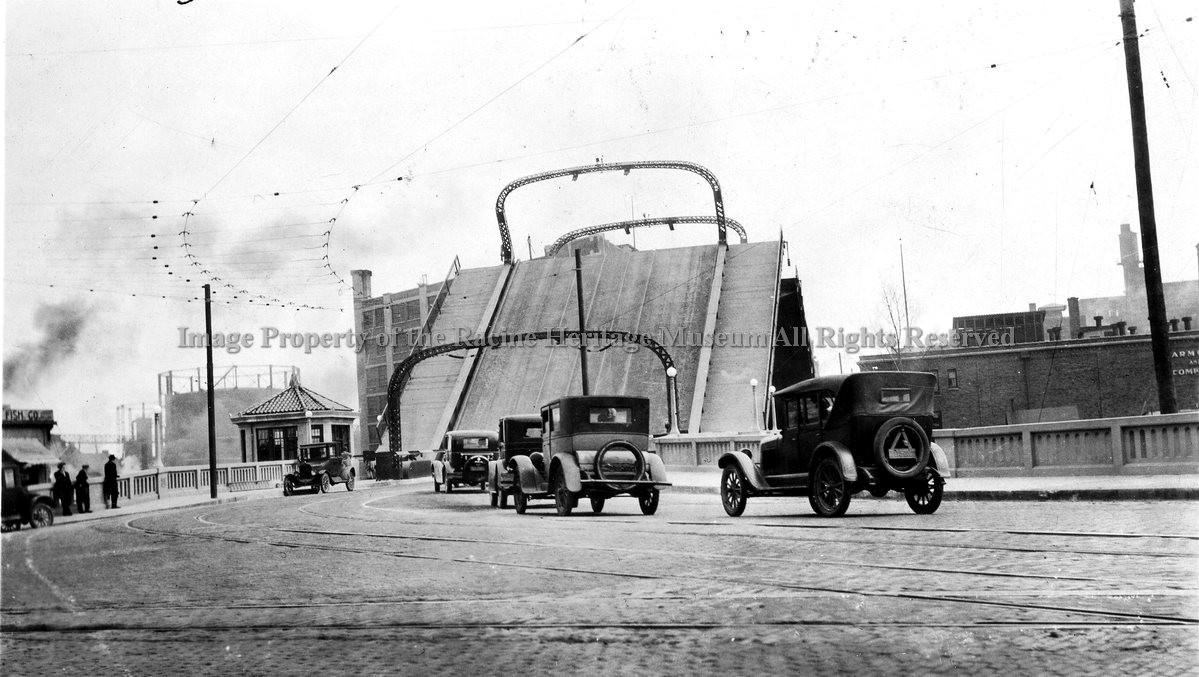
Automobiles stop for traffic at the north end of Racine's new Main Street is lifted up for a boat crossing on May 2, 1928.

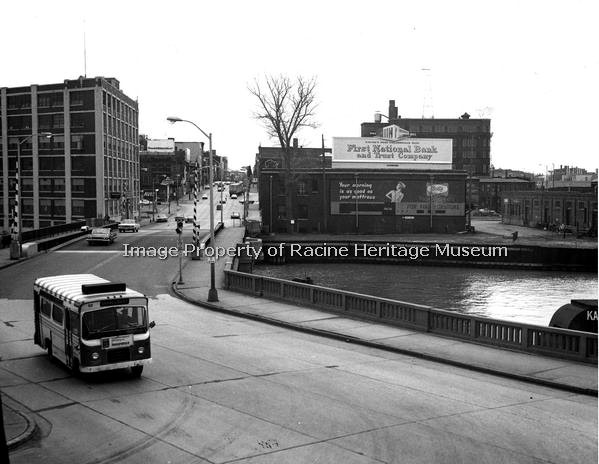
"The Main Street Bridge is the gateway into downtown Racine from the north. Looking south on Main Street from just north of the bridge in 1972, a Racine Belle Urban System "mini" bus is seen in the foreground heading north. The six-story Terminal Building, across the bridge on the left, was built in 1919 and purchased by the Oster Manufacturing Company in 1944."

The leaves of the new bascule bridge were lowered into place on February 1, 1928. Pedestrians were first allowed to cross the bridge on March 11, when the western sidewalk was finished. The first streetcars crossed the bridge on April 2, but it did not open to automobiles until later that month.

In 1929, the bridge was lifted roughly 10 to 12 times per day, or approximately 4,000 times during the year. With only 11 feet (3.4 m) of clearance between the bridge deck and the water, increasing river traffic from larger and taller boats meant that the bridge was opening about 7,000 to 8,000 times each year by the late 1970s, which became a nuisance to motorists in an increasingly car-driven city. Local residents were also frustrated by the narrow width of the bridge, worsening traffic, and the fact that its north end did not line up with North Main Street, requiring a sharp bend in the road. In 1976, the mayor and city council endorsed a proposal to replace the aging bridge, but acknowledged that the state budget was tight and the bridge was not the city's first construction priority. One proposal in 1978 suggested replacing the bridge with a tunnel, eliminating the need for a mechanical lift or a height limit on ships, but it was found to be prohibitively expensive and would have bypassed downtown.

The bridge was long painted dark green, but in August 1981, it was repainted lime green. The paint job, carried out by Olympic Painting and Sheeting Company of Youngstown, Ohio, was intended to make the bridge more visible in fog and use paint the city already had on hand, but was the subject of jokes comparing the new color to pistachio or mint ice cream, especially among Racine public works employees. In 1985, the bridge underwent major repairs costing $222,760 in order to prevent serious damage to failing components of the lift mechanism, and the city stated at the time that it did not intend to replace the bridge within 20 years.

== Second bascule bridge, 1996–present ==
By 1989, however, the state of Wisconsin had placed building a new Main Street bridge on its construction schedule for 1995. The Gaslight Pointe and One Main developments near the south end of the bridge, which were being planned in 1989, were dependent on a new bridge being built, and locals pushed the state to move the construction up to 1992 or 1993. In December 1990, after a push to list the building at 134 Main Street on the National Register of Historic Places, the city reconsidered its plans to demolish the building while rerouting the bridge.

In preparation for the construction of a new bridge, 2 Main Street was demolished in August 1994 and 112 Main Street followed in 1995. The building at 100 Main Street was repurposed as the construction site's field office, and was demolished after construction ended. Since the new bridge would be located half a block west of the one it was replacing, much of it was built before the old bridge needed to be removed. The 1928 bridge permanently closed on July 1, 1996, at about 5:40 p.m. The new bridge, built at a total cost of $12.3 million, was dedicated on November 21, 1996, and first opened to traffic the following day at about 3:45 p.m.

A 50-year-old Racine man died on October 8, 2003, when he attempted to walk across the bridge as it was being raised. He did not attempt to save himself from falling, according to witnesses, and his family said he suffered from mental illness. The bridge closed for repairs and repainting on November 30, 2012, and reopened on March 15, 2013, although two brief closures in April and May of that year were required to complete the work.
