= Jackknife Bascule Bridge =

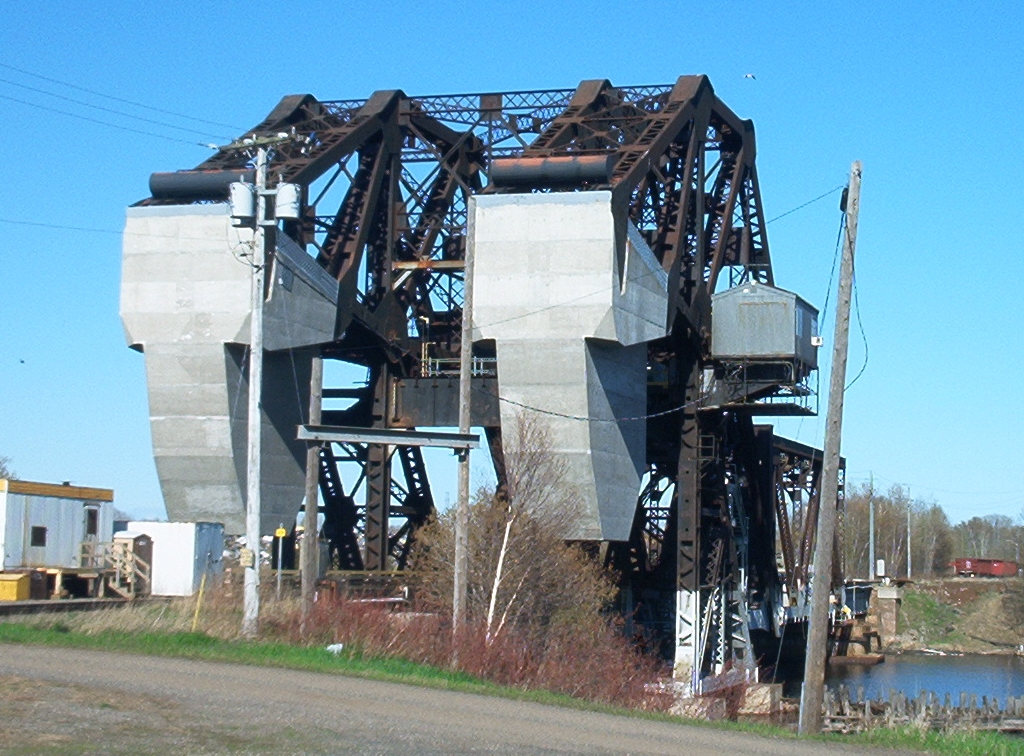
- The Jackknife Bridge in May 2008
- Coordinates: 48°22′21″N 89°14′57″W
- Crosses: Kaministiquia River
- Locale: Thunder Bay, Ontario, Canada
- Maintained by: Canadian Pacific Railway

Characteristics
- Design: Bascule
- Total length: 114 m (374 ft)
- Width: 8.8 m (29 ft)

History
- Opened: April 1913

Location
- Interactive map of Jackknife Bascule Bridge

The Jackknife (or Jack-knife) Bascule Bridge spans the Kaministiquia River at Thunder Bay, Ontario, Canada, to link the city to Mission Island, one of two islands in the Kaministiquia River delta. The bascule bridge was built by the Canadian Pacific Railway between August 1910 and April 1913. The contractor for the abutments and piers was Alexander Charles Stewart (1867–1944). The bridge had two decks, the lower deck for trains and the upper deck for vehicular road traffic.

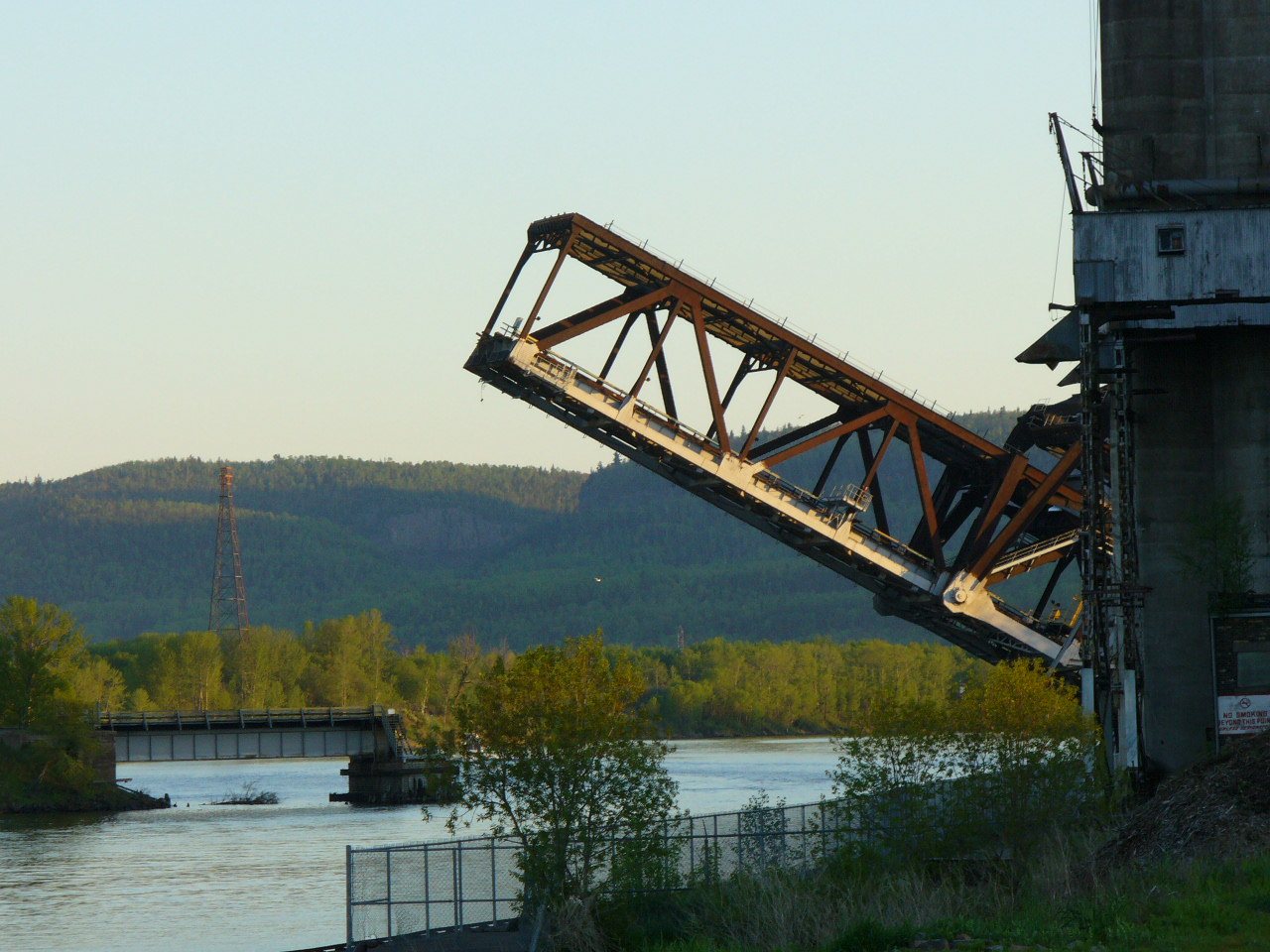
The bridge being opened for a boat in 2013

The vehicular portion of the bridge was replaced by the Island Drive Bridge, which connects neighbouring McKellar Island to the mainland, in 2003. The connecting roadways and upper deck of the Jackknife Bridge were dismantled in 2004, but the lower deck continues to function as the only rail link to the islands.

== General overview ==
The Jackknife Bascule Bridge has a road width of 8.8 metres (29 ft). The length of the entire bridge is 114 metres (374 ft) in size.

== See also ==
- List of bascule bridges
