= Slauerhoffbrug =

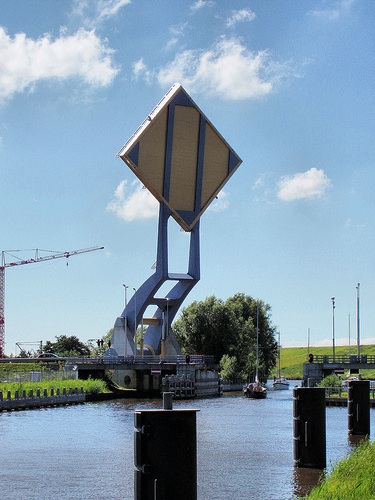
- Bridge raised for river traffic.
- Coordinates: 53.19850°N 5.76583°E
- Carries: Traffic
- Crosses: Harlingervaart
- Locale: Leeuwarden, Netherlands
- Other name: the 'Flying Drawbridge' or Frog Bridge

Characteristics
- Design: Tail bridge
- Material: Iron and steel
- Total length: 15 m (49 ft)
- Width: 15 m (49 ft)

History
- Designer: Van Driel Mechatronica
- Opened: 2000

Location
- Interactive map of Slauerhoffbrug

The Slauerhoffbrug (English: Slauerhoff Bridge) is a fully automatic bascule bridge (aka tail bridge) in the city of Leeuwarden in the Netherlands. It is a road bridge that carries the Slauerhoffweg (named after J. Slauerhoff) over the Harlingervaart. It was completed in 2000.

The bridge uses two arms to swing a 15-by-15-metre (49 ft × 49 ft) section of road in and out of place. The lift arms are oriented diagonally to the road. The bridge is painted in yellow and blue, representative of Leeuwarden's flag and seal. This movable bridge is also known as the “Slauerhoffbrug ‘Flying’ Drawbridge” or Frog Bridge (Dutch: Kikkerbrug), the last because of its shape in the down position. One of the main designers is Emile Asari. A tail bridge can quickly and efficiently be raised and lowered from one pylon (instead of hinges). This allows water traffic to pass while only briefly blocking road traffic.

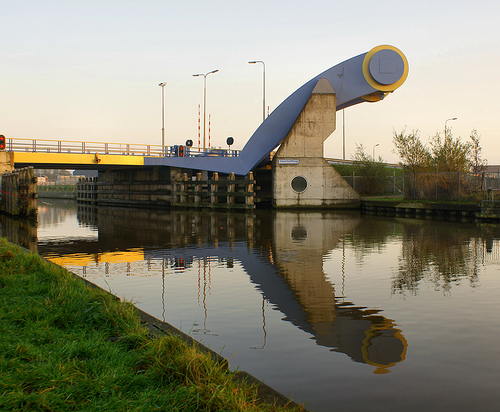
Slauerhoffbrug in down position.

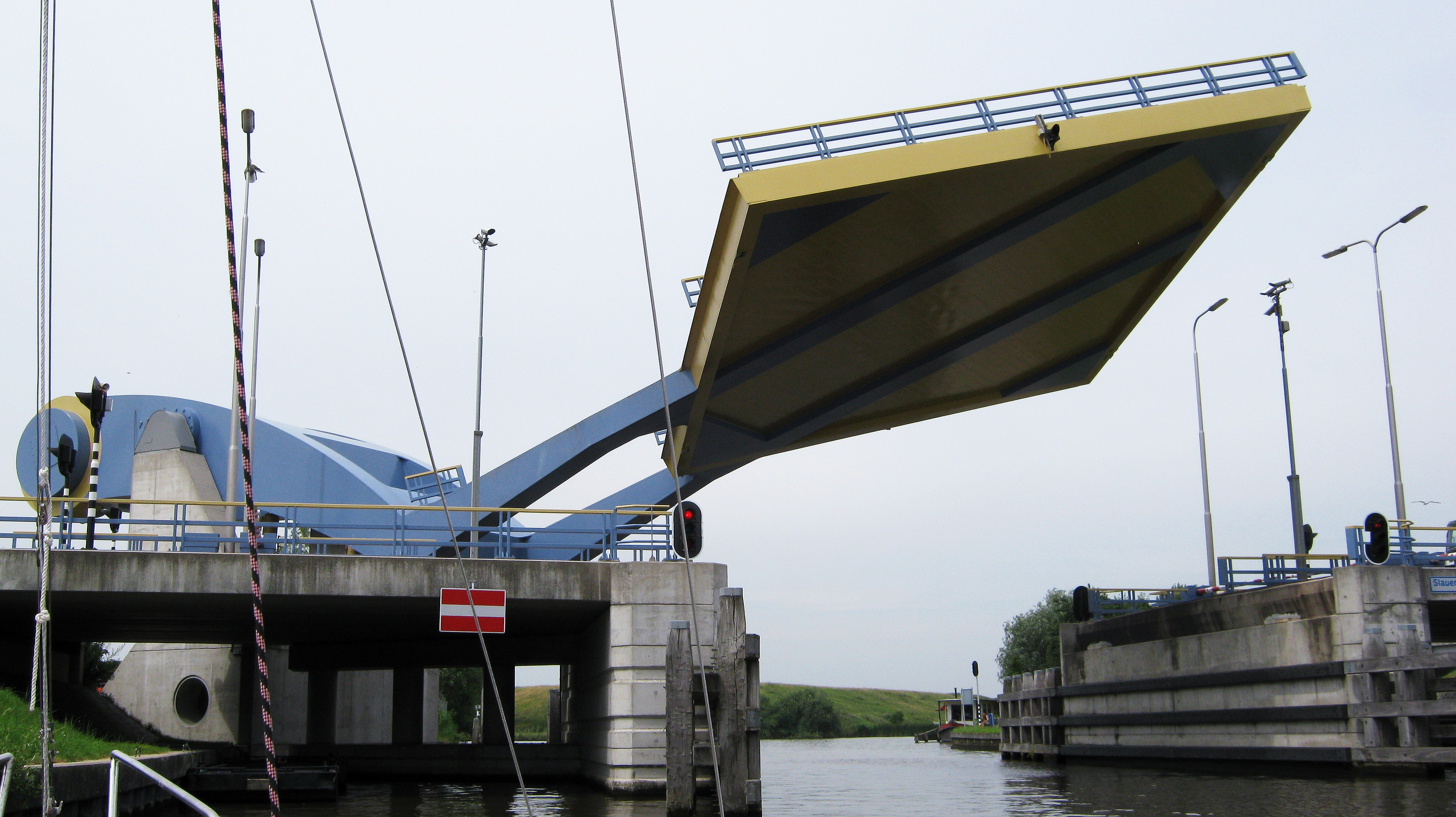
Slauerhoffbrug rising.
