= Causton Bluff =

Coordinates: 32°03′51″N 81°01′44″W

Causton Bluff is a cliff located in Chatham County, Georgia.

The community was named after Thomas Causton, an aide to colonial governor James Oglethorpe. Variant names are "Caustens Bluff" and "Caustons Bluff".
