= Cermak Road Bridge Historic District =

Historic district in Illinois, United States

Cermak Road Bridge
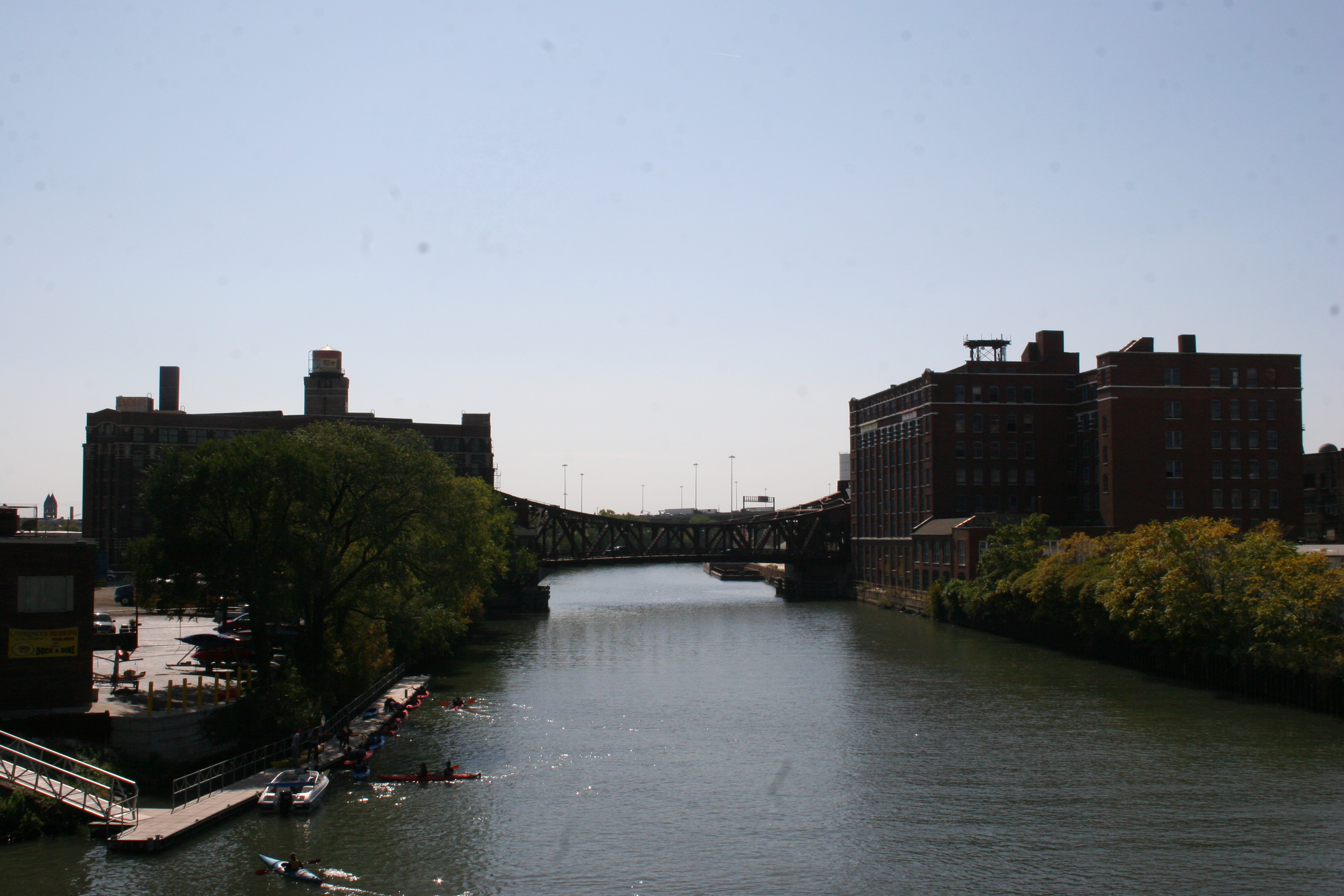
- Coordinates: 41°51′10″N 87°38′26″W
- Locale: W. Cermak Rd. & S. Branch of Chicago R., Chicago, Illinois
- Cermak Road Bridge Historic District
- U.S. National Register of Historic Places
- U.S. Historic district
- Area: 11.5 acres (4.7 ha)
- NRHP reference No.: 12000243
- Added to NRHP: May 1, 2012

Location
- Interactive map of Cermak Road Bridge

The Cermak Road Bridge Historic District is a national historic district in the Lower West Side neighborhood of Chicago, Illinois. The district includes the Cermak Road Bridge, which carries Cermak Road across the Chicago River, and four buildings clustered around the bridge. The bridge opened in 1906 and is Chicago's last remaining double-leaf Scherzer rolling lift bridge. The four buildings, all originally factories or warehouses, represent the growth of industry along the river in the early twentieth century. Sites along the river provided access not only to transportation on the river itself but also to the many railroads in the area.

The district was designated a Chicago Landmark on April 26, 2006, and was added to the National Register of Historic Places on May 1, 2012.

In 2024, the Chicago City Council approved support for a Cook County Class L tax incentive for the W. M. Hoyt Company Building at 465 West Cermak Road.
