= Harrison Street Bridge (Chicago) =

Bridge in Chicago, Illinois, U.S.

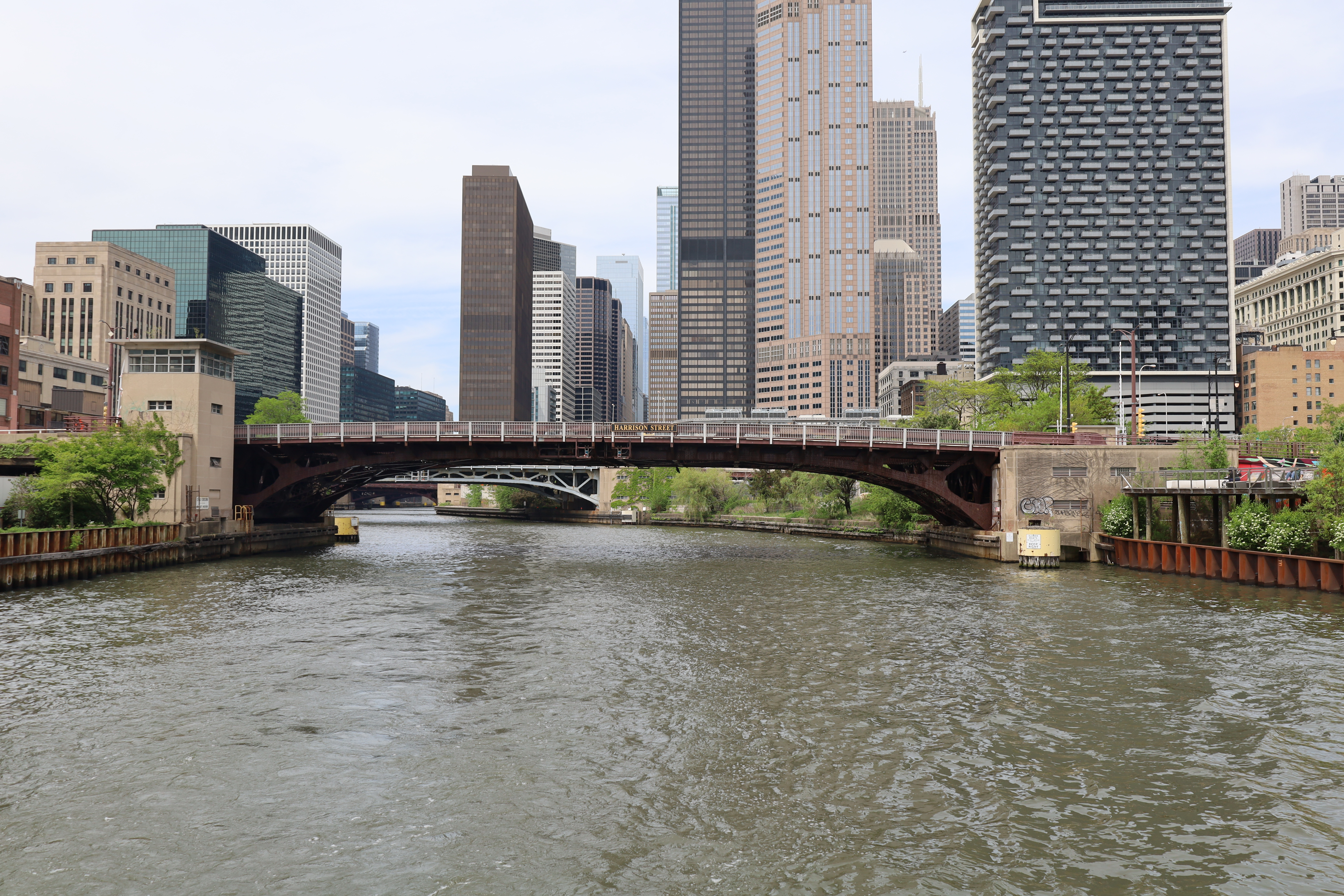
- The bridge in 2023
- Coordinates: 41°52′28″N 87°38′10″W
- Carries: Motor vehicles, bicycles, and pedestrians on Harrison Street
- Crosses: South Branch Chicago River
- Locale: Chicago, Illinois, U.S.

Characteristics
- Design: Fixed-trunnion bascule bridge

History
- Opened: August 23, 1960

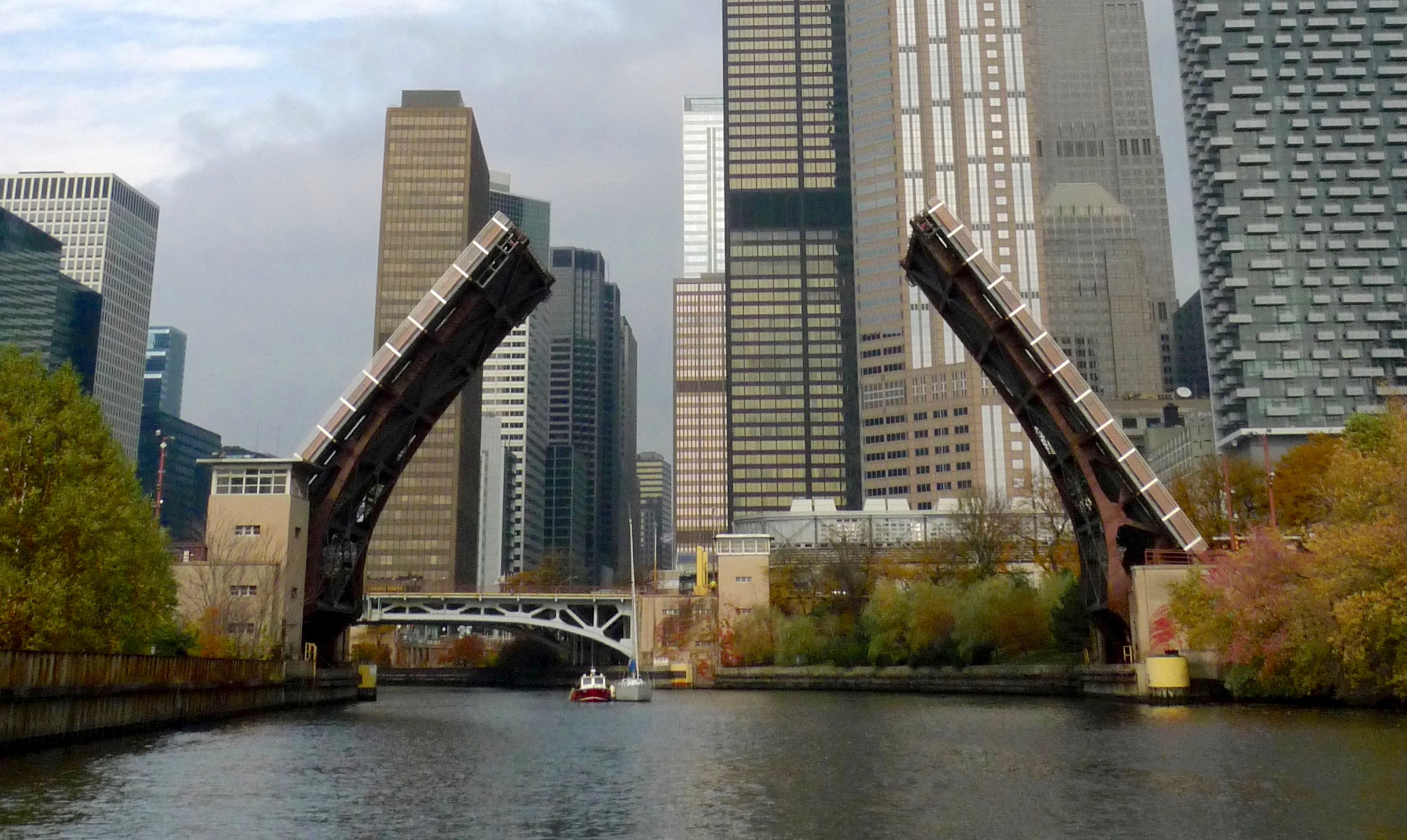
The bridge in its raised state in 2009

The Harrison Street Bridge is a fixed-trunnion bascule bridge in Chicago, Illinois, crossing the South Branch Chicago River.

== History ==
While the current iteration opened in 1960, two previous iterations took the place of the current bridge. The first bridge opened in 1877 as a hand-operated swing bridge after nearby property owners advocated for the crossing. The second bridge, a Scherzer rolling lift bascule bridge, was built from 1901 to 1905; the former swing bridge was dismantled in the process. The "Scherzer" bridge was eventually closed in December 1959 in favor of the current fixed-trunnion bridge, which opened on August 23, 1960.

The bridge was rebuilt from May 2, 2022 to October 3, 2025. The rebuild was originally scheduled to be completed in 1.5 years, but the project was delayed due to the western bridge approach being situated above Chicago Union Station tracks. Another source of delay stemmed from the need to maintain connection to the adjacent United States Postal Service facility and the Old Chicago Main Post Office.
