= Grand Avenue Bridge (Chicago) =

Bridge in Chicago, Illinois, U.S.

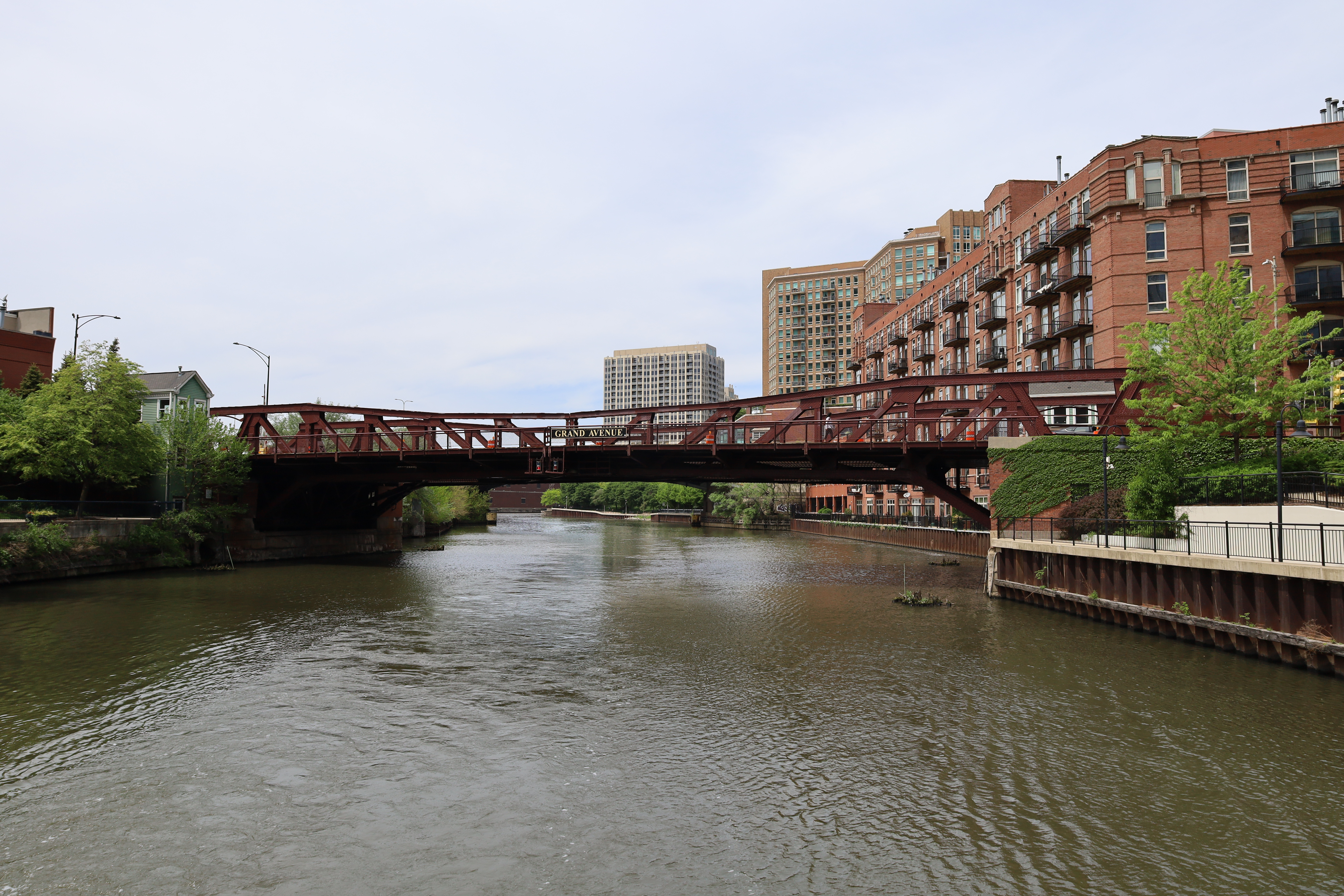
- Grand Avenue bascule bridge, as viewed from the river
- Coordinates: 41°53′29″N 87°38′28″W
- Carries: Motor vehicles, bicycles, and pedestrians on Grand Avenue
- Crosses: North Branch Chicago River
- Locale: Chicago, Illinois, U.S.

Characteristics
- Design: Fixed-trunnion bascule bridge

History
- Opened: December 13, 1913

The Grand Avenue Bridge, formerly Indiana Street Bridge, is a fixed-trunnion bascule bridge in Chicago, Illinois, that crosses the North Branch Chicago River.

== History ==
Before the current bridge opened in 1913, a swing bridge took the place of the current bridge. The wood and iron swing bridge opened in 1869.

The swing bridge was dismantled in favor of a new bascule bridge, which opened on December 13, 1913. Months earlier, on August 15, 1913, Indiana Street was renamed to Grand Avenue as part of a citywide changes of street names.
