= Chicago Avenue Bridge =

Bridge in Chicago, Illinois, U.S.

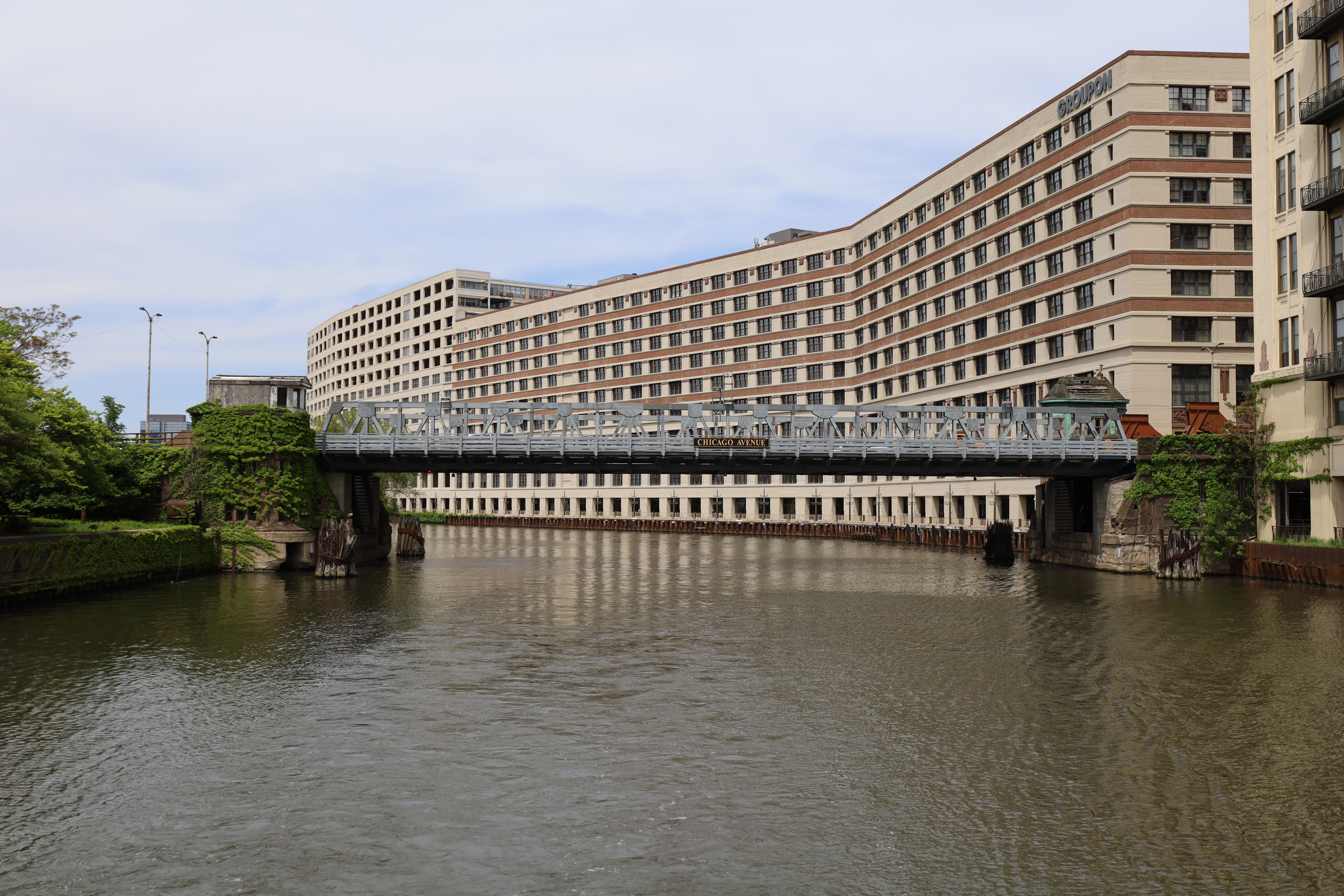
- Chicago Avenue Bridge before replacement, 2023
- Coordinates: 41°53′47″N 87°38′39″W
- Carries: Motor vehicles, bicycles, and pedestrians on Chicago Avenue
- Crosses: North Branch Chicago River
- Locale: Chicago, Illinois, U.S.

Characteristics
- Design: Truss bridge; Tied-arch bridge (future)

Location
- Interactive map of Chicago Avenue Bridge

The Chicago Avenue Bridge is a temporarily closed bridge in Chicago, Illinois, that spans the North Branch Chicago River.

== History ==
The first iteration of the Chicago Avenue Bridge opened in 1849 as a wooden bent bridge. In February 1857, river connection was severed at the bridge due to ice buildup.

The wooden bridge was replaced with a 175-foot-long (53 m) swing bridge in 1867 at the cost of $26,700 (equivalent to $601,000 in 2024). The swing bridge, designed by Fox & Howard, was constructed to be a Howe truss bridge comprising wooden braces and iron chords. The bridge was destroyed by the Great Chicago Fire in October 1871. The bridge was soon rebuilt under the same design firm, which kept the 1867 designs aside from the central pier being made of stone. The rebuild was completed in 1872 at the cost of $20,850 (equivalent to $547,000 in 2024).

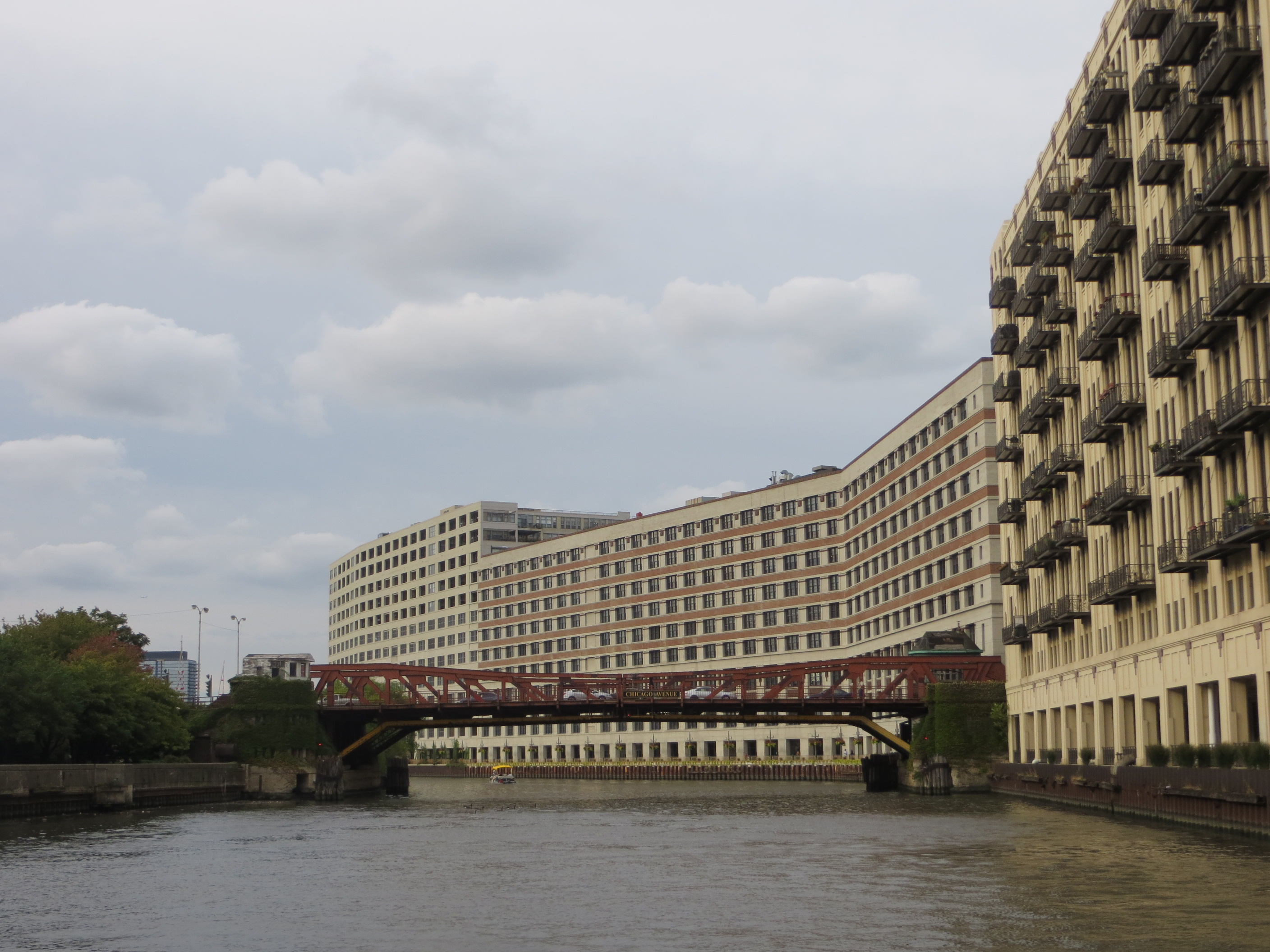
Chicago Avenue Bridge, 2013

The swing bridge was closed in 1911 as part of construction on the new fixed trunnion bascule bridge. Construction was necessitated because swing bridge piers were obstacles to river traffic. During construction, a pontoon bridge was built to minimize impact on bridge traffic. The bascule bridge opened in October 1914, costing $294,827 (equivalent to $9,255,000 in 2024).

In 2018, the Chicago Department of Transportation (CDOT) announced the replacement of the bridge, which was deteriorating through 104 years of service. Because the bridge was eligible for the National Register of Historic Places, CDOT offered to give away the bridge to any parties qualified to move and restore the bridge. Due to the lack of interested parties, the bridge was closed on November 1, 2018, and was dismantled; a new interim bridge opened on February 11, 2019.

The design for a permanent replacement bridge will be a fixed tied-arch bridge. Construction on the new bridge began on September 29, 2025, with the closure of the interim bridge. The project is slated to be completed in December 2026.
