= Van Buren Street Bridge (Chicago) =

Bridge in Chicago, Illinois, U.S.

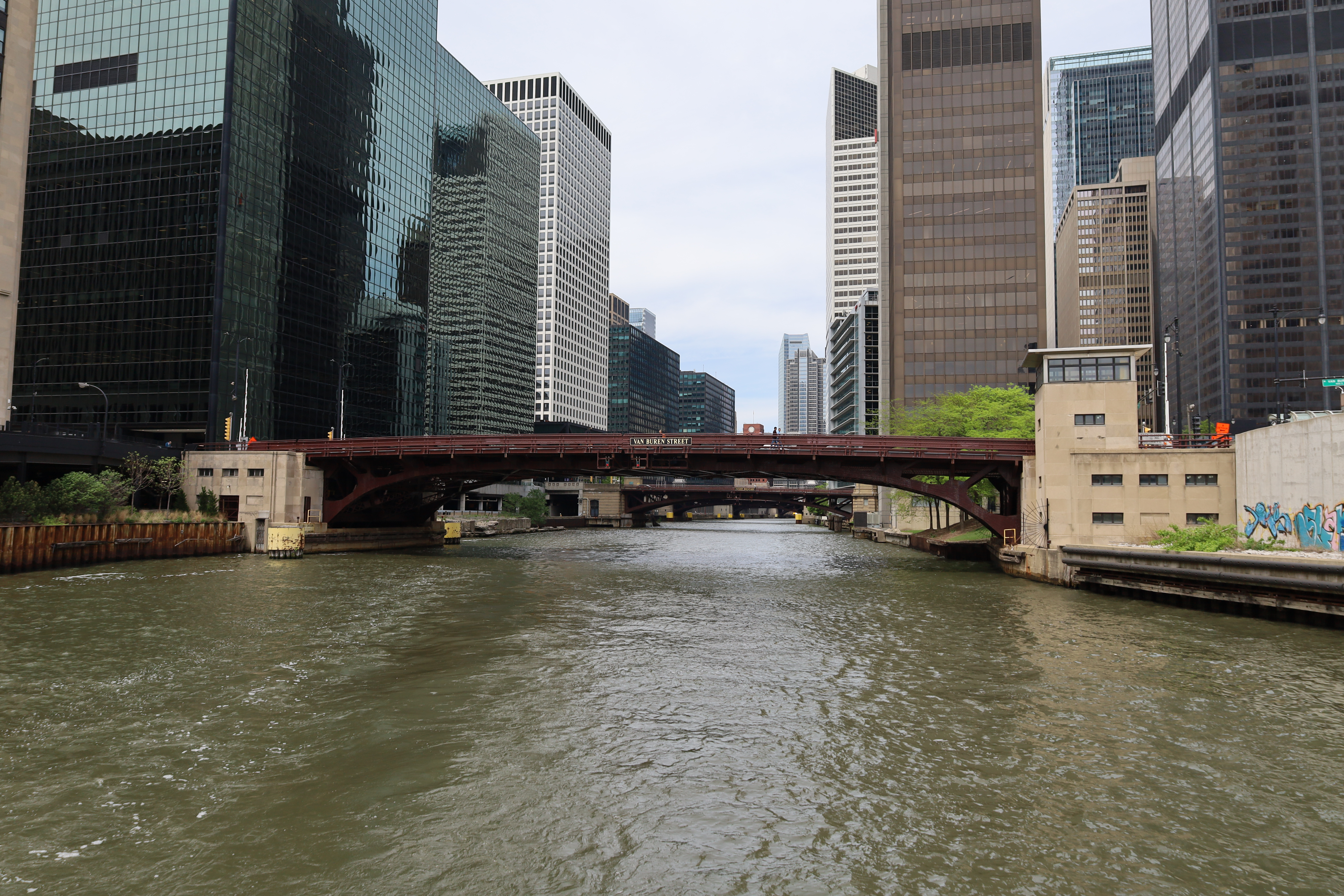
- The bridge in 2023
- Coordinates: 41°52′36″N 87°38′15″W

Location
- Interactive map of Van Buren Street Bridge

The Van Buren Street Bridge is a bascule bridge that spans the Chicago River in downtown Chicago, Illinois, United States. It is the sixth bridge at this location and carrying this name, and was completed in 1956. It replaced an 1895 Rolling Lift-type bascule bridge designed by William Scherzer.
