= Madison Street Bridge (Chicago) =

Bridge in Chicago, Illinois, U.S.

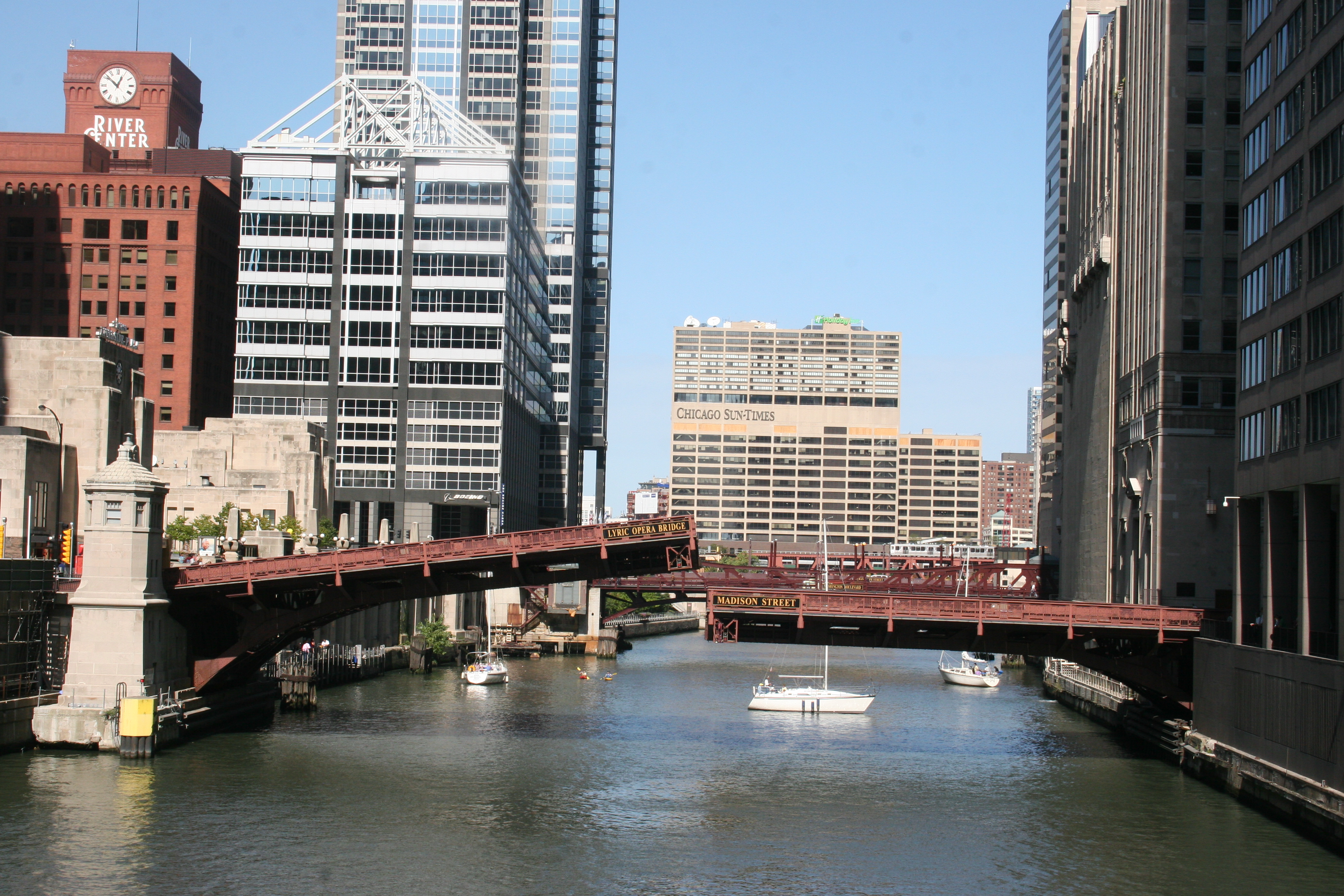
- The bridge with one of its two bascule spans partially raised
- Coordinates: 41°52′55″N 87°38′18″W

Location
- Interactive map of Madison Street Bridge

The Madison Street Bridge, officially christened the Lyric Opera Bridge on January 26, 1989, is a 1922 bascule bridge that spans the South Branch of the Chicago River in downtown Chicago, Illinois, United States.

== Official renaming ==
On January 26, 1989, Chicago Mayor Eugene Sawyer officially designated the Madison Street Bridge as the Lyric Opera Bridge. The symbolic renaming was approved by the Chicago City Council to honor the Lyric Opera of Chicago as it prepared to launch its 35th anniversary season.

The structure directly flanks the Civic Opera House, the historic 45-story skyscraper located at 20 North Wacker Drive that has served as the permanent home of the opera company since 1954. The dedication ceremony featured an outdoor celebration during which 2,200 silver balloons were released over the Chicago River while Richard Wagner's "Ride of the Valkyries" was broadcast over loudspeakers. Despite the formal civic dedication, the structure continues to be widely referred to by its geographical location as the Madison Street Bridge in local media, public transit maps, and municipal traffic reports.
