= Randolph Street Bridge =

Bridge in Chicago, Illinois, U.S.

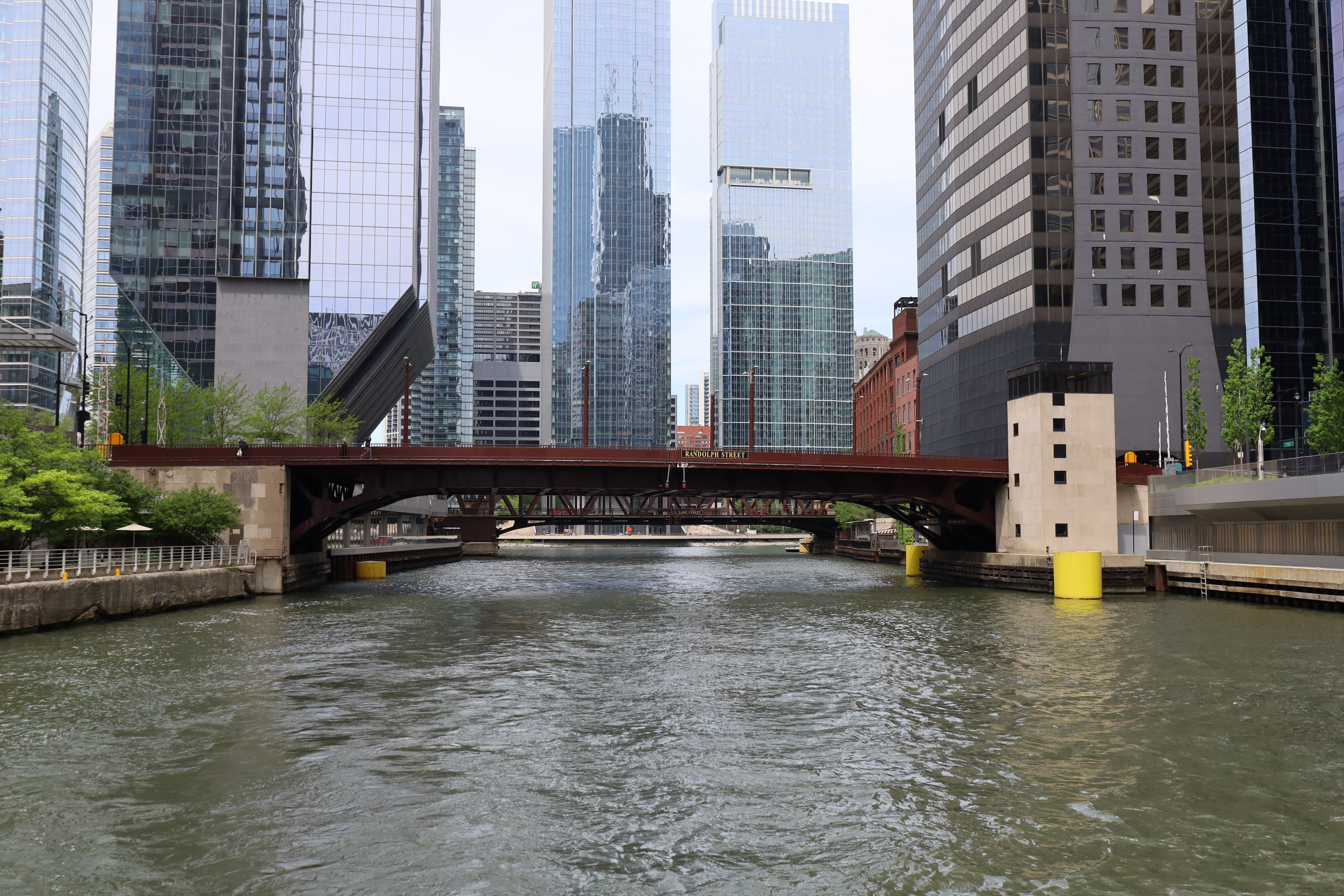
- The bridge in 2023
- Coordinates: 41°53′4″N 87°38′17″W
- Crosses: Chicago River
- Locale: Chicago, Illinois, U.S.

Location
- Interactive map of Randolph Street Bridge

The Randolph Street Bridge is a bridge that crosses the Chicago River in downtown Chicago, Illinois.
