= Washington Boulevard Bridge =

Bridge in Chicago, Illinois, U.S.

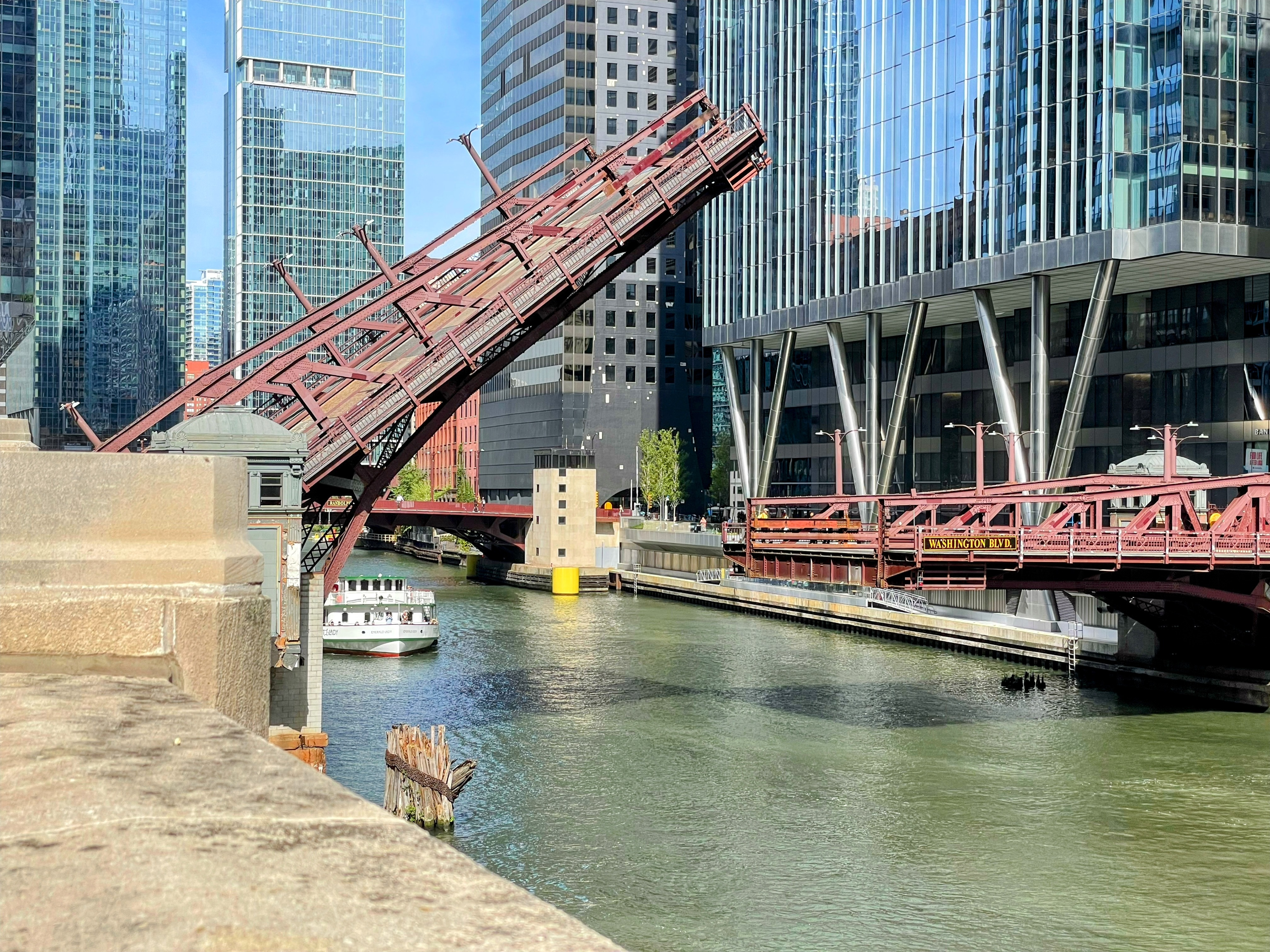
- The bridge with one leaf open in 2025
- Coordinates: 41°52′59″N 87°38′17″W

The Washington Boulevard Bridge is a bridge that spans the Chicago River in downtown Chicago, Illinois, United States.
