= Bascule bridge =

Moveable bridge type

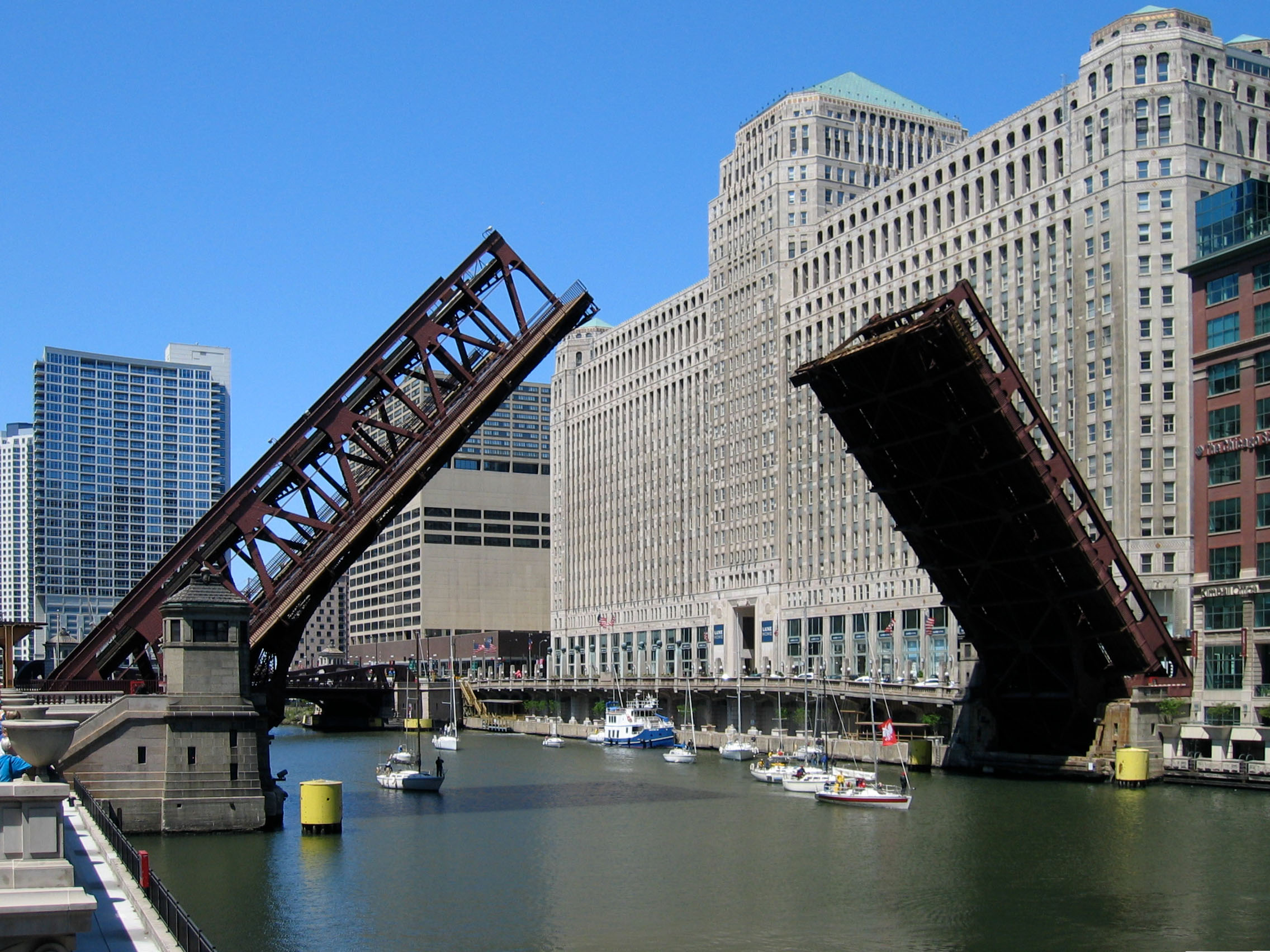
- The Wells Street Bridge (Chicago), a double-leaf fixed-trunnion bascule bridge
- Span range: Short
- Material: Steel
- Movable: Yes
- Design effort: Medium
- Falsework required: Site and prefabrication specific

A bascule bridge (also referred to as a drawbridge or a lifting bridge) is a moveable bridge with a counterweight that continuously balances a span, or leaf, throughout its upward swing to provide clearance for boat traffic. It may be single- or double-leafed.

The name comes from the French term for balance scale, which employs the same principle. Bascule bridges are the most common type of movable span because they open quickly and require relatively little energy to operate, while providing the possibility for unlimited vertical clearance for marine traffic.

== History ==
Bascule bridges have been in use since ancient times, but until the adoption of steam power in the 1850s, very long, heavy spans could not be moved quickly enough for practical application.

== Types ==
A road sign indicating a bascule bridge (or other moveable bridge) ahead

There are three types of bascule bridge and the counterweights to the span may be located above or below the bridge deck.

The fixed-trunnion (sometimes a "Chicago" bascule) rotates around a large axle that raises the span(s). The Chicago bascule name derives from the location where it is widely used, and is a refinement by Joseph Strauss of the fixed-trunnion. There are 44 movable bridges in Chicago, however 12 are not in operation. The Jackknife Bascule Bridge in Fort William, Ontario (now Thunder Bay, Ontario) was the first double-decked bascule bridge in the world, accommodating rail on the bottom and road/foot traffic on top. It was designed by Joseph Strauss for the Canadian Pacific Railway.

The rolling lift trunnion (sometimes a "Scherzer" rolling lift), raises the span by rolling on a track resembling a rocking-chair base. The "Scherzer" rolling lift is a refinement patented in 1893 by American engineer William Donald Scherzer.

The rarer Rall bascule consists of a trunnion integral to the bascule leaf which moves horizontally away from the channel along a track. A pivotally connected strut links the leaf to a fixed point in the structure, constraining the motion of the leaf. As the trunnion travels along the track, this linkage causes the leaf to rotate about the trunnion, converting horizontal motion into angular motion. It was patented in 1901 by Theodor Rall. One of the few surviving examples is the Broadway Bridge (1913), in Portland, Oregon, though it is driven through the pivotal link rather than a motor on the trunnion.

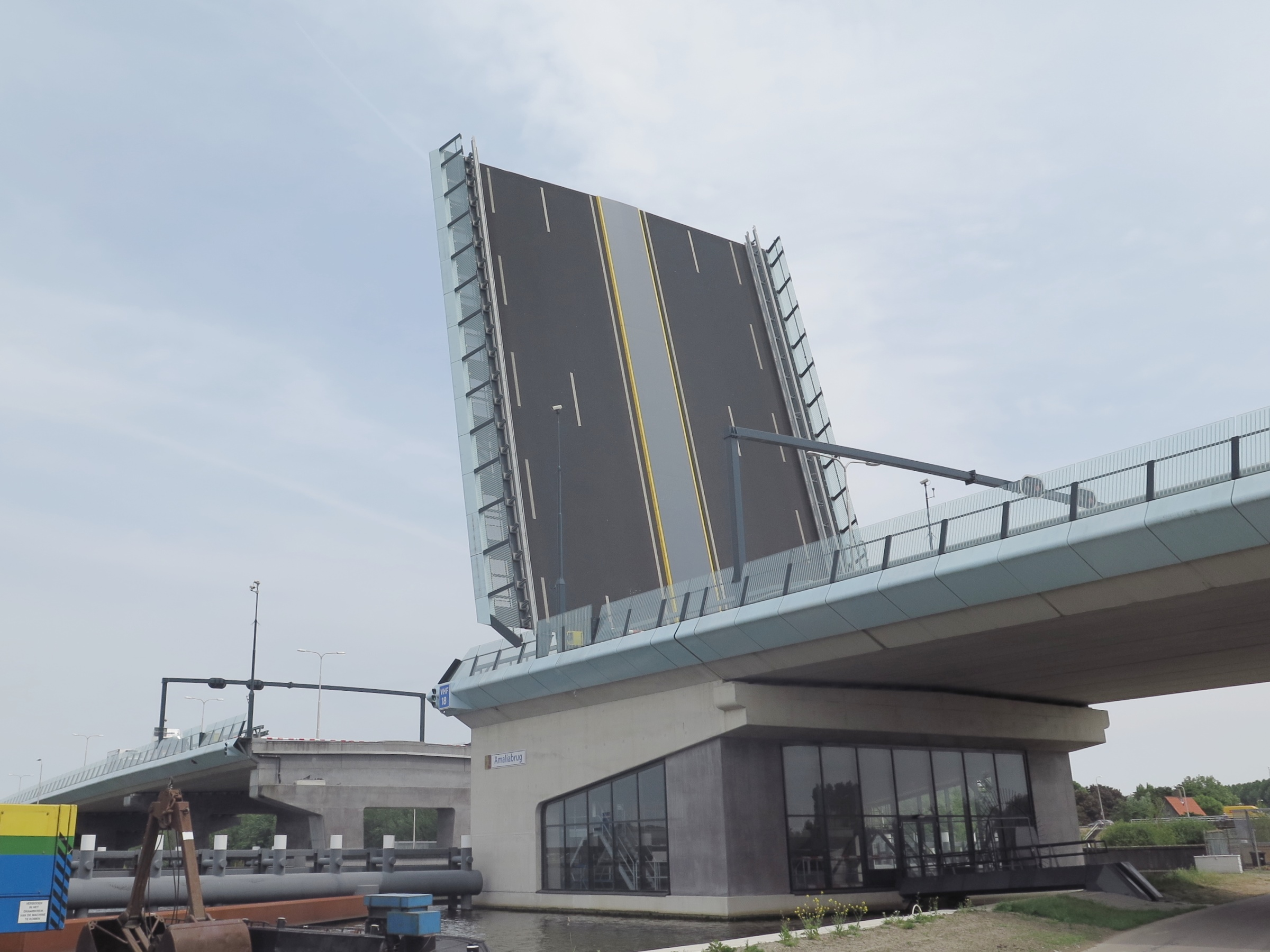
The counterweight is often hidden below the road surface in the bridge abutment.

Animation of a double-leaf Strauss fixed-trunnion bridge (based on engineering drawings from the Henry Ford Bridge)

Animation of a rolling lift bridge (such as the Pegasus Bridge)

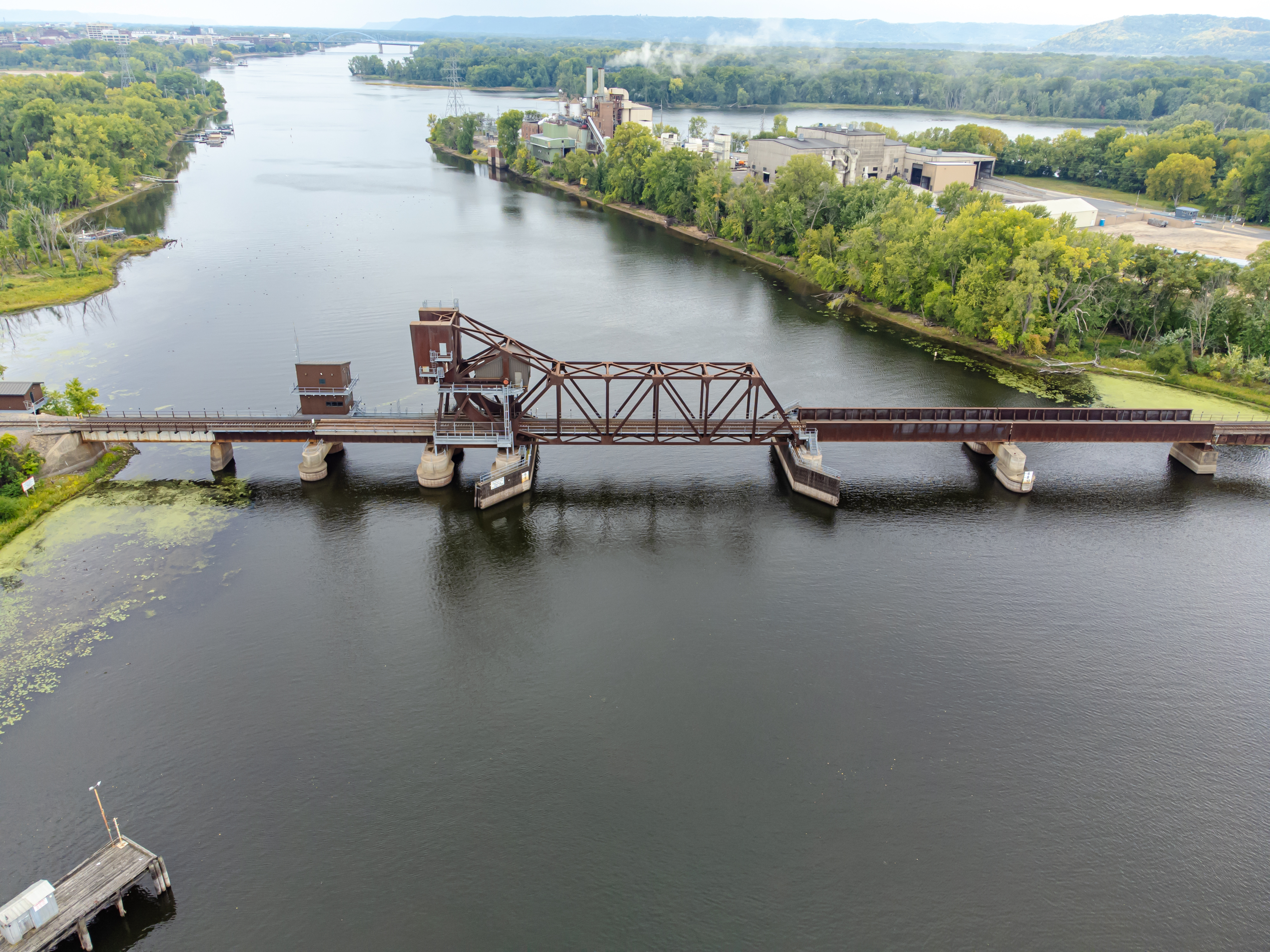
A rolling-lift bascule bridge in the down position

== See also ==
- Double-beam drawbridge
- Drawbridge
- Johnson Street Bridge
- List of bascule bridges
- Moveable bridges for a list of other movable bridge types
- Straussbrug (in Dutch)
