= Dave Matthews Band bus incident =

2004 environmental incident in the Chicago River

Coordinates: 41°53′21″N 87°38′22″W

Dave Matthews Band's tour bus stopping at the Kinzie Street Bridge to empty its blackwater tank

On August 8, 2004, a tour bus belonging to the American rock group Dave Matthews Band dumped an estimated 800 pounds (360 kg) of human waste from the bus' blackwater tank through the Kinzie Street Bridge in Chicago onto an open-top passenger sightseeing boat sailing in the Chicago River below. The incident has been referred to as "Poopgate" in retrospective assessments.

The members of Dave Matthews Band were not on or near the bus during the incident. After weeks of investigation, during which the band claimed that all of their tour buses were accounted for, a Dave Matthews Band bus was deemed to be the culprit. The band's bus driver, Stefan Wohl, initially denied dumping the waste. He was later determined to be the only person on the bus during the incident; in April 2005, he pleaded guilty to the dumping, and the band fired him without pay.

As part of the band's 2005 legal settlement with the state of Illinois, in exchange for the band not admitting guilt to the incident in court, its members agreed to pay a $200,000 fine to fund environmental protection efforts and other related causes. They also donated a combined $100,000 to two groups that protect the river and the surrounding area.

== Background ==
Dave Matthews Band had booked rooms at the Peninsula Hotel on 108 E. Superior Street for a two-night show at Alpine Valley Music Theatre in East Troy, Wisconsin. The incident occurred between the first and second nights of the concert. The band booked five buses for its show; Stefan Wohl drove the bus of the band's violinist Boyd Tinsley.

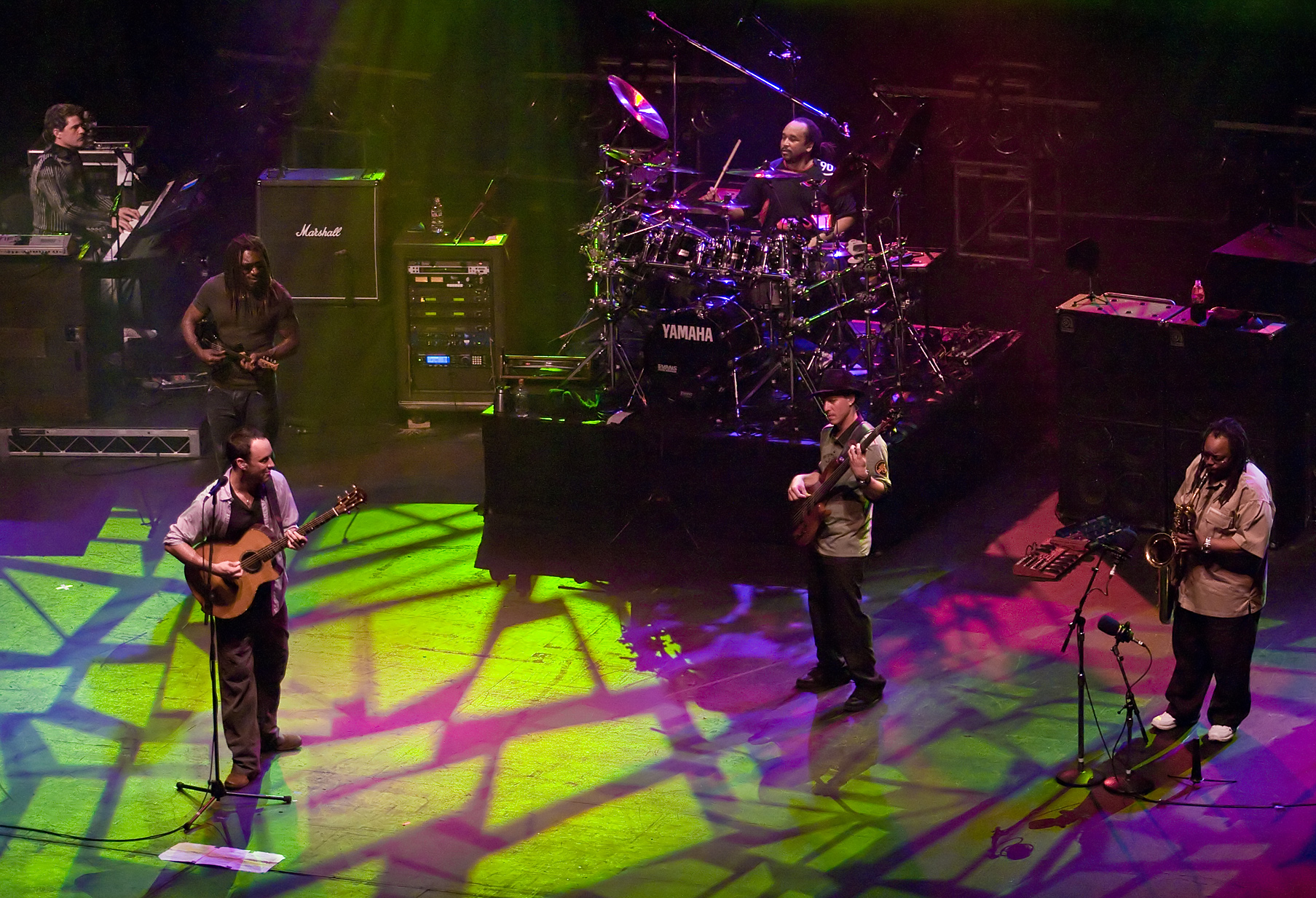
Dave Matthews Band performing in 2005

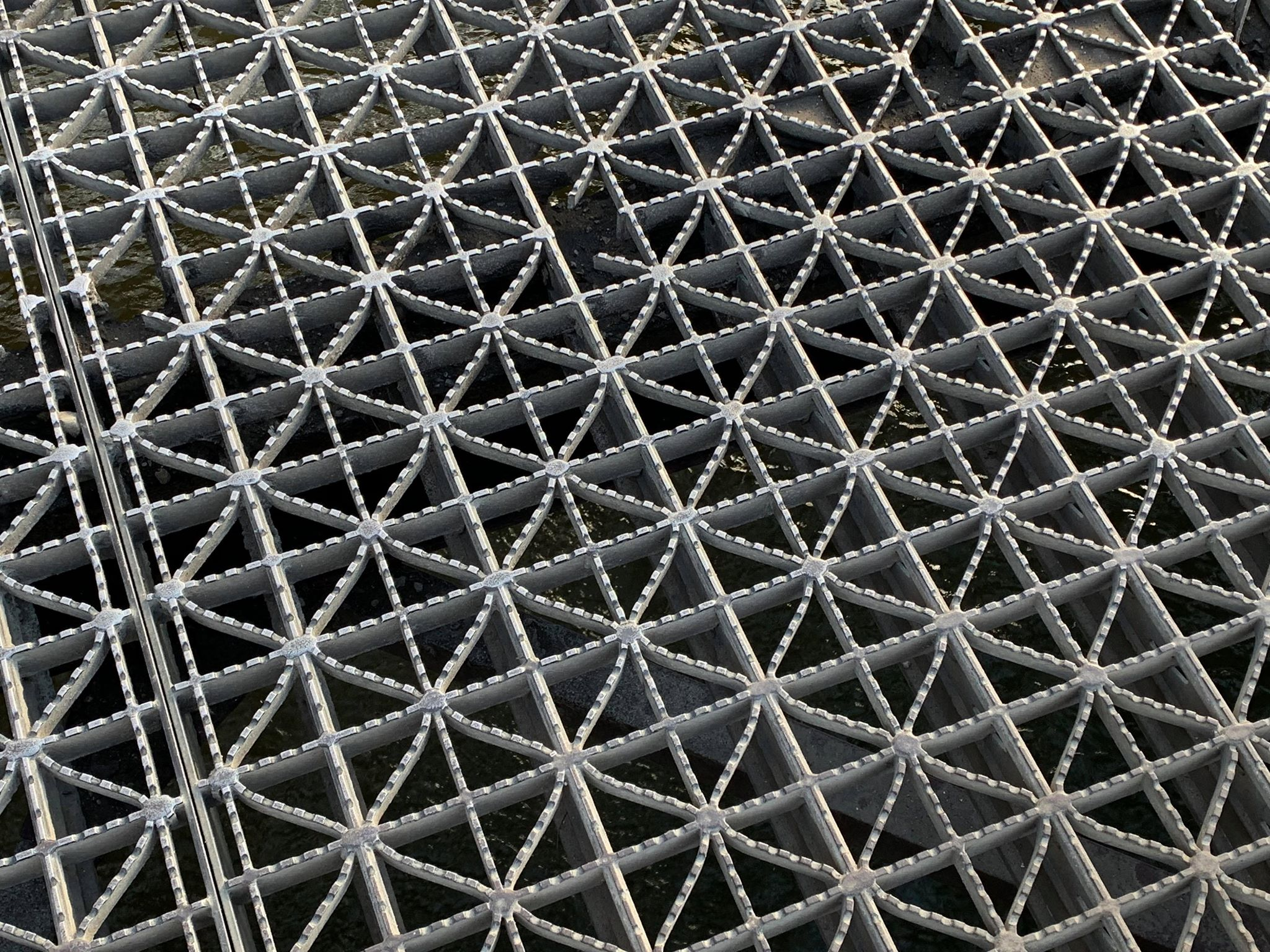
The welded grate above the Chicago River

During warm months, the Chicago Architecture Center offers a boat tour of buildings along the Chicago River. The boats have open-roof seating, where passengers sit during the tour.

Most of Chicago's bridges feature welded grating, which is used for its strength and anti-slip properties. Welded grating allows rain, snow, and other liquids to pass through, removing the need for complicated drainage systems or salting the bridge deck during snow and assuring it does not ice over in wintry weather.

== Incident ==
On August 8, 2004, Wohl was alone in Tinsley's bus and driving to a downtown hotel when he emptied the bus' blackwater tank as it crossed the metal grates of the Kinzie Street Bridge.

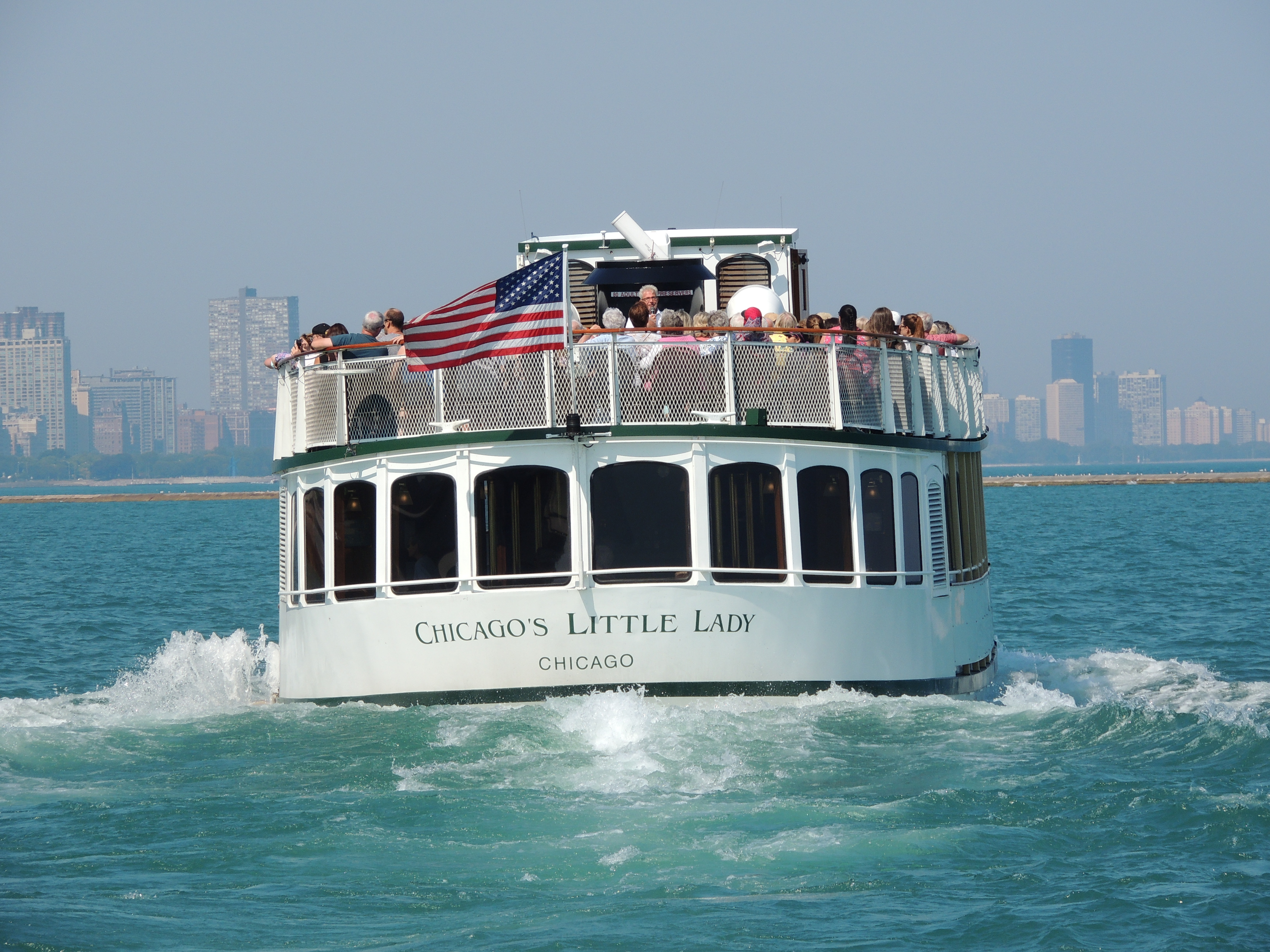
Chicago's Little Lady, the boat involved in the incident

Passenger boat Chicago's Little Lady was hosting the 1:00 PM Chicago Architecture Foundation tour of the Chicago River. While passing under the bridge, the boat received the full contents of the tank on the seats of its open-roof terrace. Roughly two-thirds of the 120 passengers aboard the tour boat were soaked. The boat immediately returned to its dock, where all passengers were issued refunds. Five passengers were taken to Northwestern Memorial Hospital for testing. According to the Illinois Attorney General, passengers aboard included people with disabilities, the elderly, a pregnant woman, a small child, and an infant. The filing describes the incident:

The liquid waste was brownish yellow in color, and had a foul, offensive odor. The liquid human waste went into passengers' eyes, mouths, hair, and onto clothing and personal belongings, many of which were soaked. Some of the passengers suffered nausea and vomiting as a result of exposure to the human waste.

The boat's deck was swabbed by its crew, and service was resumed for its scheduled 3:00 PM tour.

== Investigation ==
Immediately following the incident, the Chicago Police Department said it was investigating but did not yet consider the incident a crime. On August 9, the Chicago Architecture Foundation stated that a witness had recorded license-plate information, which they submitted to the police as evidence. On August 10, bus driver Jerry Fitzpatrick, who drove for the band, was identified as the owner of the bus's license plate. In a phone interview, Fitzpatrick denied to a Chicago Tribune reporter that he dumped the waste, asserting that he was parked in front of the band's hotel at the time. A publicist for the Dave Matthews Band issued a statement saying the band's management had determined that all of its buses were parked at the time of the incident.

Fitzpatrick, who was in Effingham, Illinois, at the time, instructed Sgt. Paul Gardner of the Effingham Police Department to inspect the bus's septic tank to prove that he could not have emptied it. Gardner reported to the Chicago Tribune over Fitzpatrick's cell phone that he inspected the tank and it was nearly full.

State prosecutors worked with nearby fitness gym, the East Bank Club, to identify the offending bus from the gym's security videotapes. On August 24, Illinois Attorney General Lisa Madigan filed a $70,000 lawsuit against Stefan Wohl, alleging that he was responsible for the dumping. Wohl denied dumping the waste and was supported by the band. On August 25, the mayor of Chicago Richard M. Daley held a press conference in which he released the videotape used as evidence. Daley, himself a fan of the band, expressed his belief that the dumping was "absolutely unacceptable".

In March 2005, Wohl pleaded guilty to reckless conduct and discharging contaminants to cause water pollution. He was sentenced to 150 hours of community service, fined $10,000 to be paid to Friends of the Chicago River, an environmental organization, and received 18 months probation. The Dave Matthews Band donated $50,000 to the Chicago Park District and $50,000 to Friends of the Chicago River and paid the State of Illinois a settlement of $200,000. The band agreed to keep a log of when its buses empty their septic tanks.

== Legacy ==
No passenger suffered long-lasting physical health effects from having the waste dumped on them. In a 2009 interview with WTMX, Dave Matthews said that he'd "apologize for [the incident] as long as [he has] to". Satirical website The Onion published an article about the incident in 2018 containing an edited image supposedly depicting it. On August 8, 2023, the Riot Fest Historical Society attached a plaque to the Kinzie Street Bridge commemorating the 19th anniversary of the incident.

On August 7, 2024, in anticipation of the incident's 20th anniversary, many previously unknown passengers and crew from the incident spoke publicly about their experience, including the captain of Chicago's Little Lady, Sonja Lund. Most passengers reported that, though originally disgusted and upset by their experience, they began to find it humorous over time. On August 8, 2024, a documentary film entitled The Crappening was announced with the goal of finding and recording first-hand witness accounts of the event.
