= Shirley Dyke =

American civil and mechanical engineer

Shirley J. Dyke is an American civil and mechanical engineer, the Donald A. and Patricia A. Coates Professor of Innovation in Mechanical Engineering and a professor of civil engineering at the Purdue University College of Engineering and a former editor-in-chief of Engineering Structures. Her research has focused on structural dynamics and earthquake engineering including the seismic safety of buildings and bridges, problems in control theory involving tuned mass dampers and magnetorheological dampers, and the use of computer vision in bridge inspection.

== Education and career ==
Dyke majored in aeronautical and astronautical engineering at the University of Illinois Urbana-Champaign, graduating in 1991. She continued her studies in civil engineering in the Notre Dame College of Engineering at the University of Notre Dame, where she completed her Ph.D. in 1996.

From 1996 to 2009 she was a faculty member at Washington University in St. Louis, eventually becoming Edward C. Dicke Professor in the departments of civil engineering and mechanical engineering there. She took her present position at Purdue University in 2009. At Purdue, she directs the Resilient ExtraTerrestrial Habitat Institute, and the Intelligent Infrastructure Systems Lab.

== Recognition ==
Dyke was a 1998 recipient of the Presidential Early Career Award for Scientists and Engineers, "for excellence in mitigating structural damage from seismic events using semi- active control systems, and providing hands-on experiences for graduate, undergraduate and K-12 students". She was elected as an ASME Fellow in 2025.
