= Anti-slip grating =

Metal surface

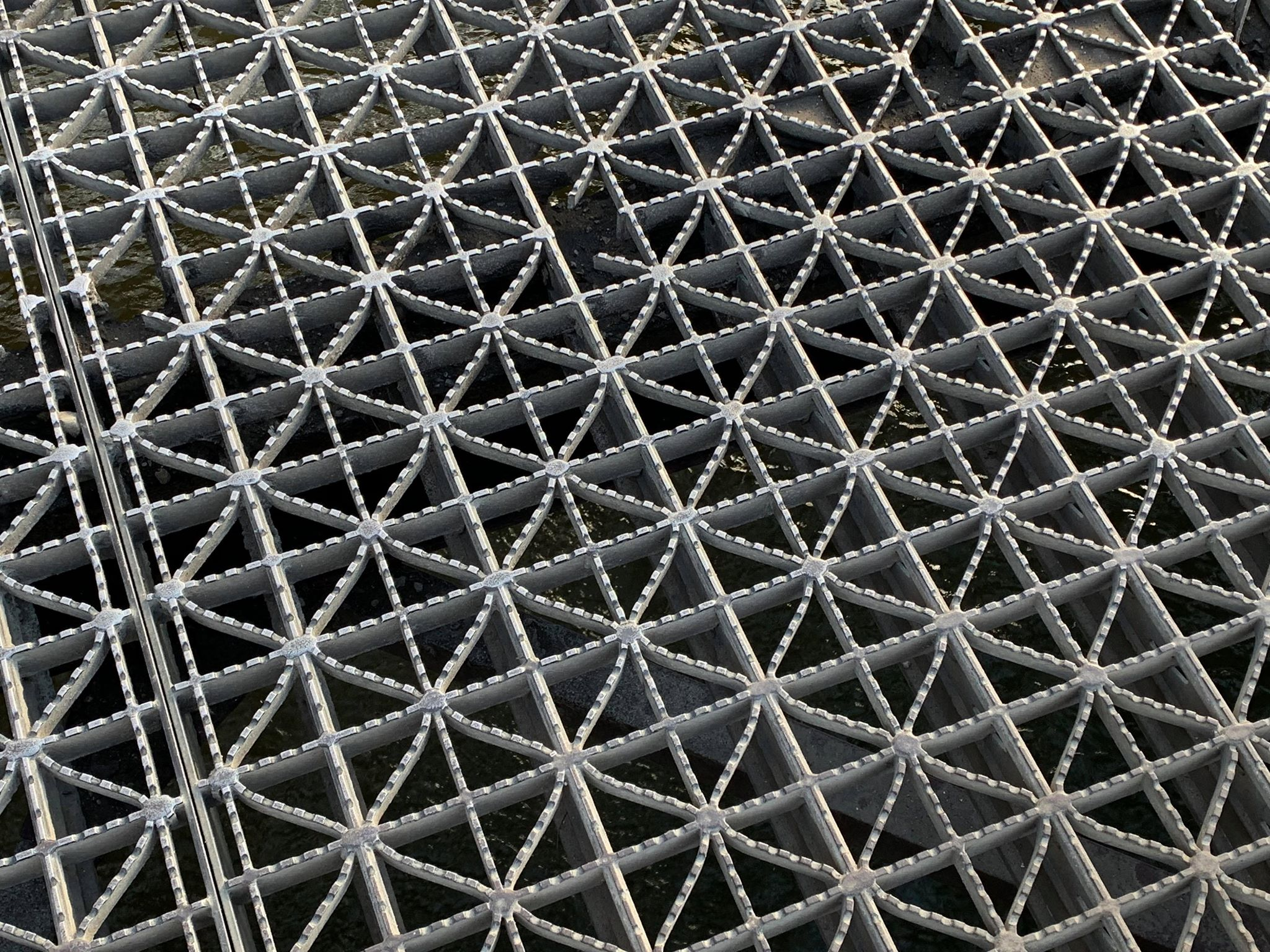
Grating on the Kinzie Street Bridge in Chicago, Illinois

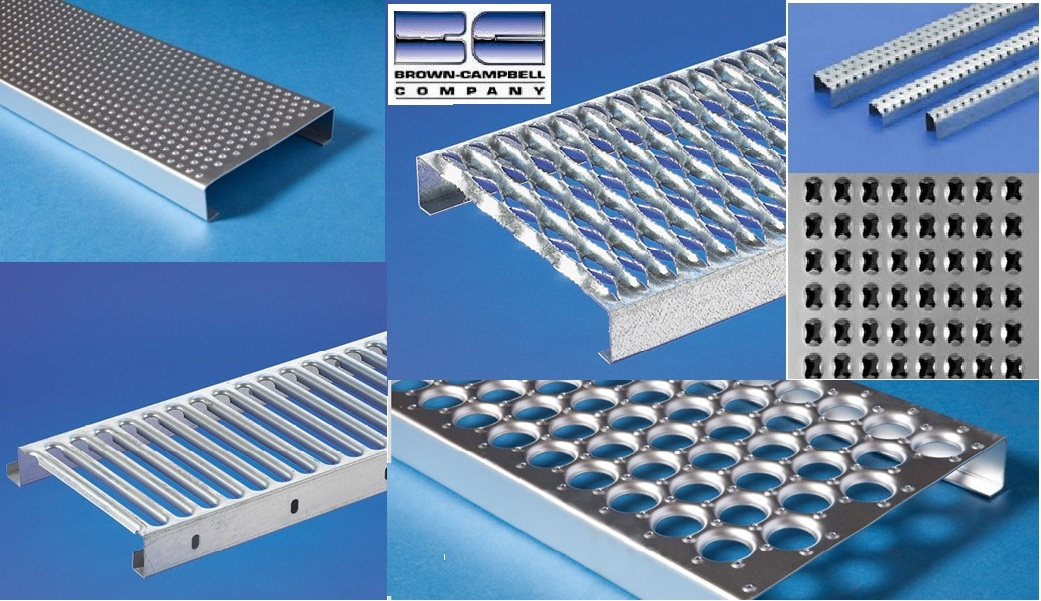
Safety Grating

Anti-slip gratings (more correctly known as slip-resistant grating or safety grating) are grating products used to provide grip on steps, running boards, walkways, platforms, and ladder rungs.

Anti-slip gratings are produced by stamping perforations or serrations into sheet metal. Bar gratings, expanded metal, and diamond plate (or checker plate) are technically not safety gratings. Independent testing of these products demonstrate very little slip resistance compared to true safety grating.

While metal gratings are most common, some can also be made using fiberglass reinforced plastic.

== Types ==
Stamped sheet metal safety gratings

- Diamond-shaped serrated perforated sheet metal. Examples of trade names are Grip Strut, Diamond Grip, Ry, Diamond, Grip Span, Deck Span, GripTrac.
- Round hole perforated sheet metal. Examples of trade names are Perf-o-grip, Safety-grip, Shur Grip, Ry-Grip, Open Grip and Grate Lock.
- Raised dimple perforated sheet metal. Examples of trade names are Traction Tread, Safety Tread, Shur Step, Ry-Tread and Tread Grip.
- Bar grating is a heavy-duty grating product best suited for heavy loads such as vehicles. Bar grating is often supplied in a serrated or non-serrated condition.

== Effectiveness ==
A 2015 study found that diamond weave patterns were the most effective variety of anti-slip gratings. However, anti-slip gratings are less effective at preventing slips on inclines greater than 10° or in environments with a lot of ice, grease or water.

Effectiveness of anti-slip gratings also varies based on the metal used to create it.

== Uses ==
Common uses for these products are steps, running boards, walkways, platforms, and ladder rungs.
