= Chicago Tunnel Company =

Narrow gauge underground railway

Coordinates: 41°52′45″N 87°37′45″W

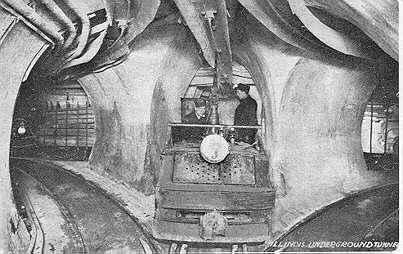
- Under the streets of Chicago, pre-1906

Overview
- Headquarters: Chicago
- Locale: Illinois
- Dates of operation: 1906–1959
- Successor: abandoned

Technical
- Track gauge: 2 ft (610 mm)
- Length: 60 miles (97 km)

The Chicago Tunnel Company was the builder and operator of a 2 ft (610 mm) narrow-gauge railway freight tunnel network under downtown Chicago, Illinois. This was regulated by the Interstate Commerce Commission as an interurban even though it operated entirely under central Chicago, did not carry passengers, and was entirely underground. It inspired the construction of the London Post Office Railway.

== History ==
=== Initial tunnels ===
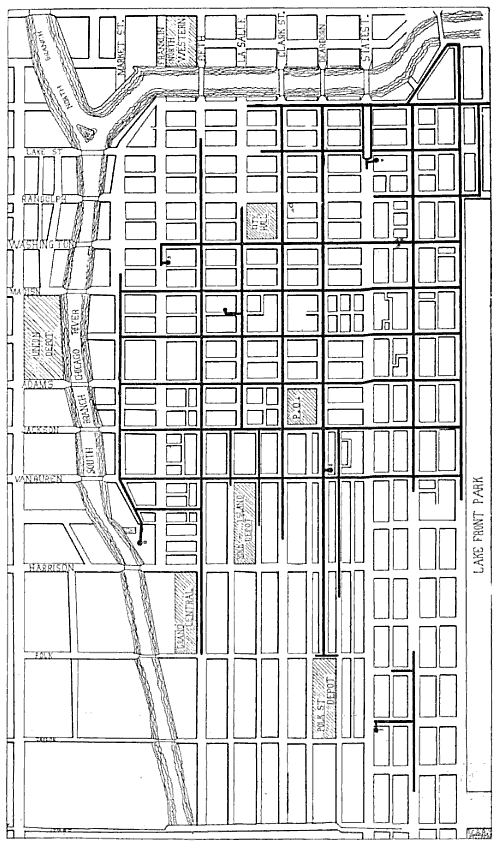
1902 system map, tunnels shown in black. Construction shafts are dots to the side of the tunnels.

The city of Chicago granted the newly formed Illinois Telephone and Telegraph company the rights to construct utility tunnels under the streets of Chicago in 1899 to carry its planned network of telephone cables. Initial plans for the tunnels called for filling them with phone cables, leaving a 6-foot (183 cm) by 14-inch (36 cm) passage for maintenance. When the city refused to permit manholes through which cable could be unreeled into the tunnels, the plans were changed to include rails for hauling cable spools through the tunnels. The city was largely unaware of the nature of the tunneling, and the first 16 miles (26 km) of tunnel were excavated somewhat covertly, working from the basement of a saloon and carting away the spoil after midnight.

Initially, the intended purpose of the narrow gauge railroad below the telephone cables was limited to hauling out excavation debris and hauling cable spools during the installation of telephone lines, but in 1903, the company renegotiated its franchise to allow the use of this railroad for freight and mail service. On February 10, 1904, a banquet for 1,200 Press Club members celebrated the tunnel system's opening in a freight tunnel 40 feet (12 m) below ground. In early 1905, the system was taken over by the Illinois Tunnel Company. By this time, 26 miles (42 km) of a projected 60 miles (97 km) of tunnel had been completed. The actual construction work was subcontracted to the Illinois Telephone Construction Company, under the management of George W. Jackson (1861–1922).

=== Refinancing ===
By 1904, the first round of financing for tunnel system construction had largely been spent. A second round of financing was arranged by James Stillman of the National City Bank of New York City, with public support from E. H. Harriman, Jacob H. Schiff, and Patrick A. Valentine, all directors of that bank. With this financing, the Chicago Subway Company, incorporated in New Jersey, became a new holding company for the tunnel system.

The Chicago Warehouse and Terminal Company was an affiliate, formed in 1904 to construct and operate terminal facilities for interchanging freight with railroads and other carriers.

The Illinois Tunnel Company continued to expand the tunnel system and serve a growing customer base until 1908, when the employees moved to join the Amalgamated Association of Street and Electric Railway Employees. The tunnel company refused to recognize the union and began firing union members. Despite the intervention of Congressman William Lorimer, all 260 employees went on strike on May 9. The company hired strikebreakers and refused to rehire any of the strikers.

The Tunnel Company ran into a problem with a part of its planned expansion. In November 1906, the Chicago Board of Local Improvements announced it was considering widening Halsted Street between Chicago Avenue and 22nd Street. 300 property owners on Halsted Street, represented by the Law Firm of Adler & Lederer (now known as Arnstein & Lehr, LLP), opposed the widening of the street because it would interfere with their business and the cost would result in burdensome assessments. Attorney Charles Lederer charged that there was graft connected with the proposition to widen the street and that if this was done the scheme was then to utilize the street to connect the tunnel with the Chicago Stockyards so that it would have access to the railroads.

=== Bankruptcy and reorganization ===
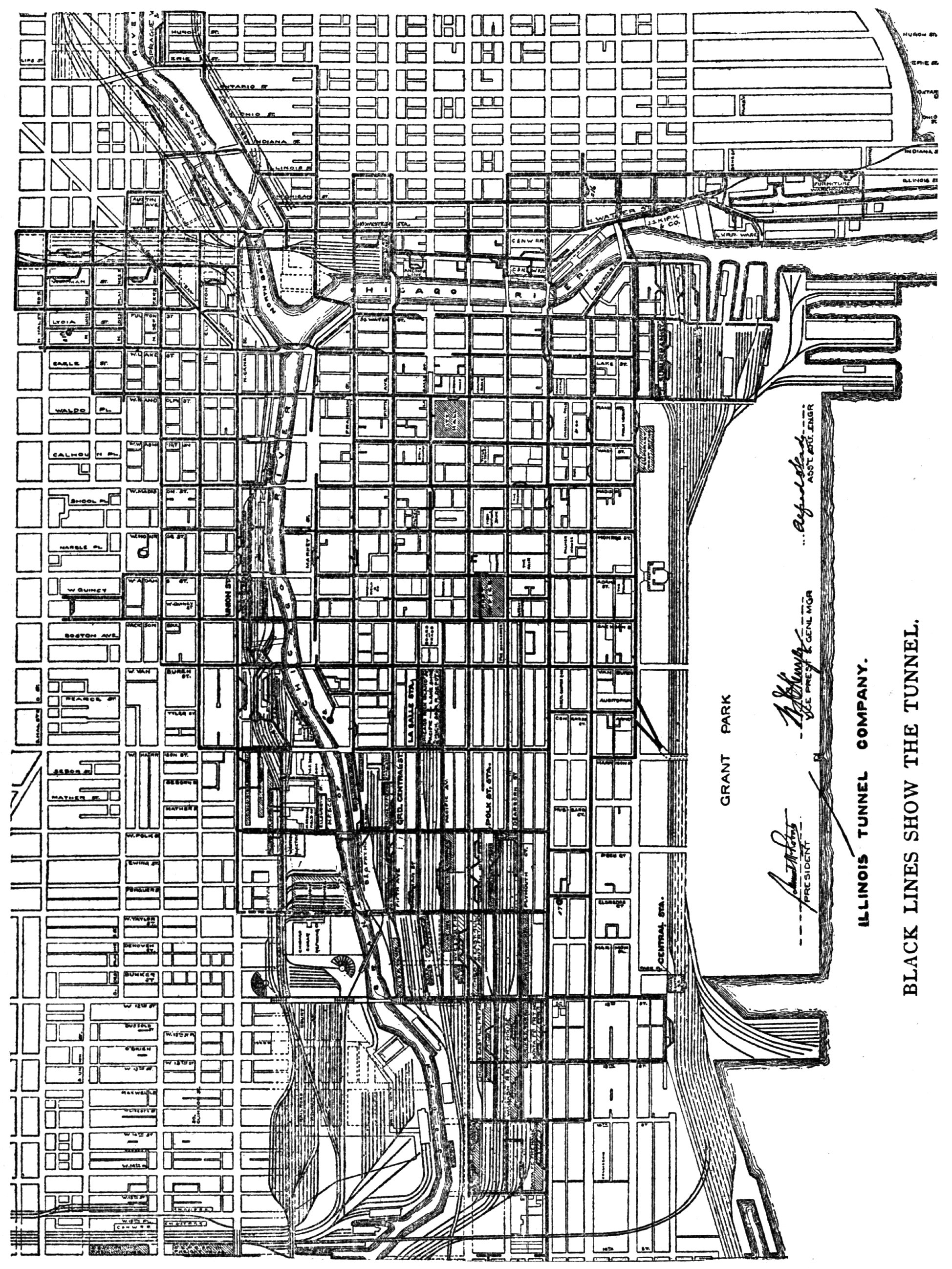
1910 system map, tunnels shown in black. Close to 60 miles (97 km) of tunnel had been built by this time.

By 1909, the cost of construction had bankrupted the Illinois Tunnel Company. By this time, it was estimated that $30,000,000 had been spent on building and operating the tunnel. The receiver's sale was completed in 1912, with the Chicago Tunnel Company, a wholly owned subsidiary of the Chicago Utilities Company, acquiring all assets of the former company and its affiliates, the Chicago Warehouse and Terminal Company and the Illinois Telephone and Telegraph Company. In 1913, the Chicago Tunnel Company agreed to sell its telephone operations to American Telephone and Telegraph Company, although regulatory approval delayed the actual sale until 1916. By 1920, all telephone cables had been removed from the tunnels.

By 1914, about 60 miles (97 km) of tunnel had been constructed, typically 7 feet 6 inches (2.3 m) high and 6 feet (1.83 m) wide, with 2 ft (610 mm) gauge track. 19 elevators connected the tunnel with customers, and five elevators served universal public stations where freight could be dropped off or picked up by the public. The railroad operated 132 electric locomotives, typically 30 to 50 horsepower (22 to 37 kW) each, and had 2,042 merchandise cars, 350 excavating cars and 235 coal and ash cars. In 1914, the tunnel company handled 609,320 short tons (544,036 long tons; 552,766 t) of freight, 275,218 short tons (245,730 long tons; 249,674 t) of which were merchandise. The remainder was presumably coal, ash and excavation debris.

From 1912 into the 1930s, the tunnel company was managed by Sherman Weld Tracy. It was never very profitable, but it avoided receivership, with most of the stock held by J. Ogden Armour, E. H. Harriman and their heirs.

=== Conflict with the subway ===
Plans for passenger subway service in Chicago date back to the turn of the 20th century, and the original permits to dig the freight tunnels allowed for future cut-and-cover subway development above the tunnels. In the 1930s, when the Chicago Rapid Transit Company and the city finalized the design of the State Street and Dearborn Street subways, plans called for the tunnels to be dug through the blue clay along the line originally followed by the freight tunnels. Excavation debris from the new subway tunnels was hauled away by the Chicago Tunnel Company as the subway replaced the freight tunnels along their route.

=== Company failure ===
The Chicago Tunnel Company went bankrupt and applied for voluntary reorganization in 1956. The tunnel company attempted to sever itself from the bankrupt holding company, claiming it could operate at a profit, but by 1959, the tunnel asked for abandonment permission. The Interstate Commerce Commission consented to abandonment that July, and the tunnel assets were sold at auction for $64,000 in October.

=== Tunnel flooding ===
In late 1991 near the Kinzie Street Bridge, a new set of pilings (collectively known as a "dolphin") were driven into the riverbed to prevent barges from bumping into the bridge. As the pillars were installed, a miscalculation was made that caused severe damage to the tunnel directly below the river.

The risk of flooding was well understood by George W. Jackson, the chief engineer who built the tunnel system. In 1909, Jackson received a patent on a portable bulkhead that could be used to seal off flooded tunnel sections. The tunnel developers were also concerned by the flooding risk posed by firefighting efforts in buildings connected to the tunnels. Should a building catch fire, immense quantities of water could pour into the tunnels through elevator shafts and basement connections. To deal with this risk, watertight fire doors were fitted into all building connections. Small leaks in the tunnels under the Chicago River had become commonplace by 1913; to deal with them, the tunnel company drilled holes in the tunnel wall and pumped grout at high pressure into the soil outside the tunnel in the vicinity of the leak.

The 1992 flood was not the first time that a contractor's action threatened to flood Chicago by puncturing the tunnel. In 1959, an excavation punctured the tunnel, leading to a dramatic and successful fight to prevent disaster.

In 1992, a cable television employee in the tunnel underneath the Chicago River videotaped mud and water oozing in where the bottom of the wooden pilings had cracked the tunnel wall. The pilings making up the dolphin had been driven only a few feet from the side of the tunnel, and the wooden pilings were visible through the collapsed tunnel wall where wet clay had slumped away from the wood into the tunnel.

Official response to the reported leak was slow; no emergency measures were deemed necessary, and a formal bidding process began for the contract to repair the damage. On April 13, some six months later, the slow oozing of wet clay opened a clear passage from the riverbed, allowing the river to pour directly into the tunnel. In what became known as the Chicago Flood, the entire system was quickly flooded. The Merchandise Mart was the first victim, declaring a water emergency at 5:57 am. City Hall began to flood by 6:02 am, the Federal Reserve Bank at 8:29 am, finally, the Chicago Hilton and Towers at 12:08 pm. The long delay before some buildings were flooded was the result of closure of some sections of the tunnel system in 1942 when the passenger subways were built. Many businesses had not realized that they were still connected to the tunnel complex, as the openings were boarded up, bricked up, or otherwise closed off—but not made watertight.

At that point, government agencies belatedly responded. The leak was stopped and the tunnels were emptied within days at great cost. The tunnels are still used for power and communication cables. They have been popular with urban exploration groups who would sometimes sneak in to have a look around, but since the Joseph Konopka terrorism scare in the early 2000s, all access to the tunnels has been secured.

The accident shut down the entire downtown area for days, causing considerable economic losses. Insurance battles lasted for years, the central point being the definition of the accident, i.e., whether it was a "flood" or a "leak." Leaks were covered by insurance, while floods were not. Eventually it was classified a leak, which is why some have called it the "Great Chicago Leak."

=== Recent incidents ===
On October 14, 2009, workers pumping concrete into the tunnel under the Kennedy Expressway caused the roadway to buckle, shutting down all but one lane of the westbound expressway.

== Design and construction ==
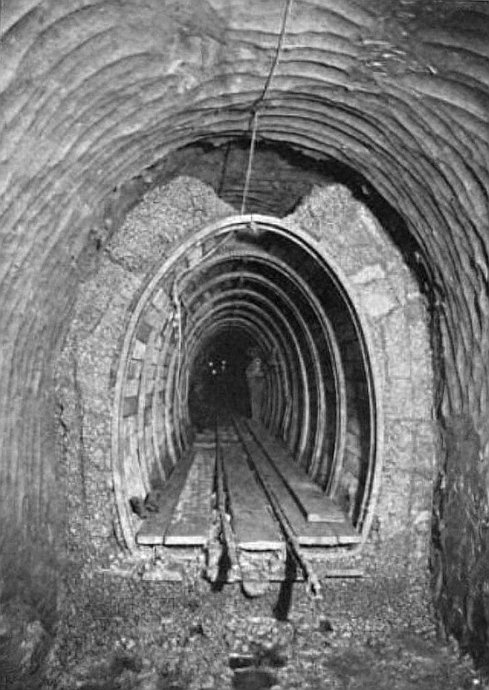
Tunnel under construction in 1902. The freshly cut clay ahead of the concrete work shows clear knife marks.

The standard tunnel was egg-shaped, 7 feet 6 inches (2.29 m) high and 6 feet (1.83 m) wide, with tunnel walls 10 inches (25 cm) thick and a floor 14 inches (36 cm) thick. Some trunk-line tunnel segments were built larger, 14 feet (4.27 m) high by 12 feet 9 inches (3.89 m) wide. The tunnels were built through a layer of soft blue clay, and tunneling was done by cutting the clay with modified draw knives. Parts of the tunnel were pressurized to 10 pounds per square inch (69 kPa) during tunneling, while other parts were tunneled at atmospheric pressure. The tunnel was lined with coarse concrete and then waterproofed with a Portland-cement limestone-dust plaster. George W. Jackson was granted a patent on the system of forms used in making the concrete tunnel lining.

The city asked that the tunnel be built no shallower than 22 1/2 feet (6.86 m) below the pavement in order to allow room for a future streetcar subway.

During construction, temporary 14 in (356 mm) gauge tracks were laid. The 6-foot (1.83 m) tunnel was wide enough for double tracks with this small size. The tunnel company had 900 small cars built specifically to run on this track. The cars had a box with a capacity of only 0.47 cubic yards (0.36 m^{3}), and were pulled by mules from the tunnel headings to hoists that removed the spoil to the surface or later to points where the spoil could be transferred to 2 ft (610 mm) gauge cars for haulage to the Grant Park disposal station. Tunneling work continued around the clock, 24 hours a day, completing an average of 2 miles (3.2 km) of tunnel per year per heading during the first few years of development

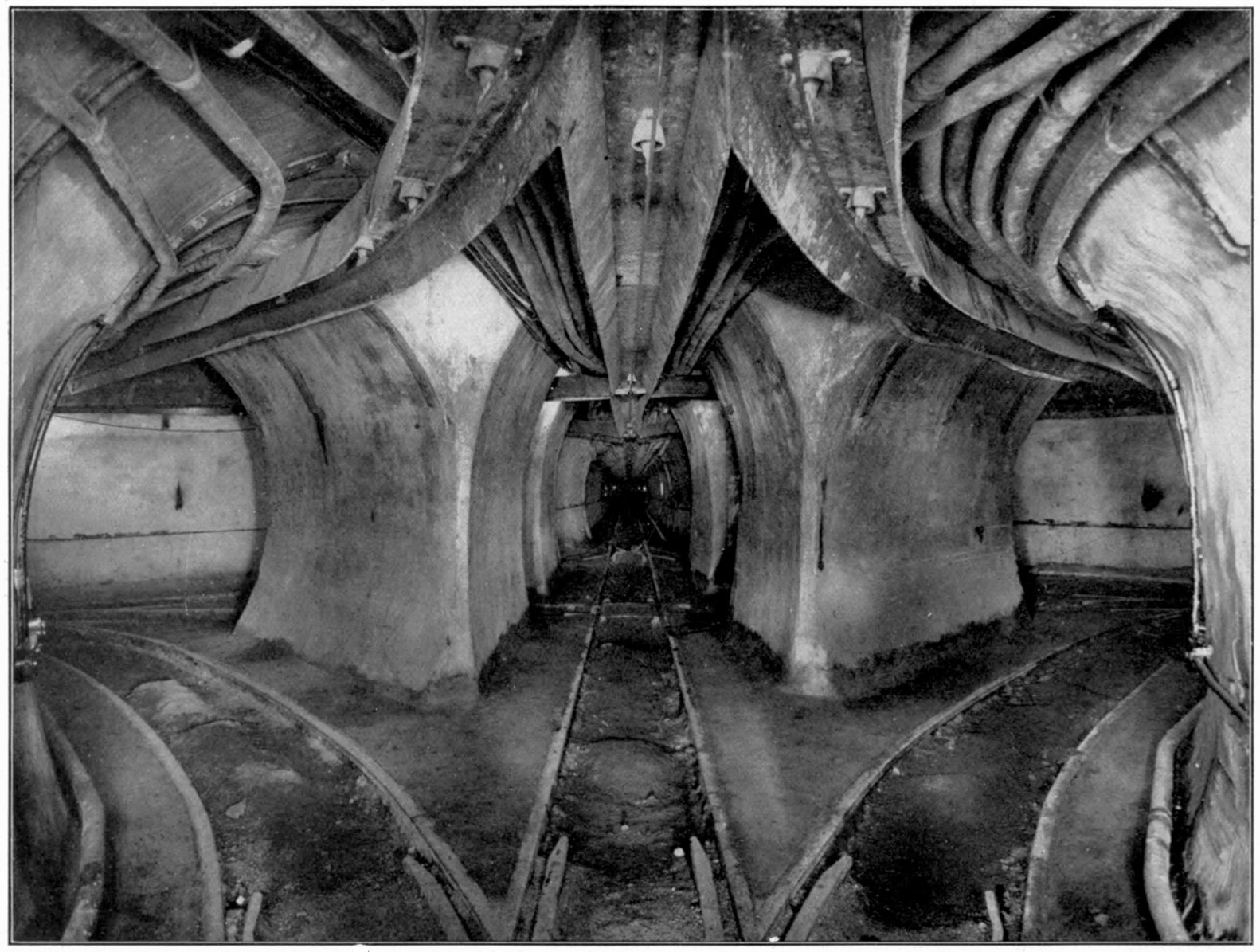
Trackwork in a typical grand union where two tunnels intersected, photographed before 1906

The 2 ft (610 mm) gauge track was laid in the tunnels, using rails 4 1/4 inches (110 millimetres) high (56 pounds per yard or 27.8 kilograms per meter). Crossties were not used. Instead, rails were mounted on chairs embedded in the concrete tunnel floor. Frogs and crossings were built on steel plates that were then embedded in the concrete floor.

Curves in the tunnels were very tight. Mainline curves were as little as 16-foot (4.88 m) radius, and the grand unions under street intersections were built to a 20-foot (6.1 m) radius. Grades in the tunnel system were limited to 1.75 percent, except for the lines up to the Grant Park disposal station, which climbed at a 12 percent grade.

The tunnel, 40 feet (12.19 m) below street level, was drained by 71 electric pumps. There was very little seepage into the tunnels, a natural consequence of excavation in clay, but any water that did find its way in was quickly pumped up to the sewers above. Ventilation was natural, relying primarily on the piston effect of trains pushing through the tunnels to circulate the air.

While buildings with deep subbasements could connect directly to the tunnel, connections to surface level and shallow basements were by elevator shafts. George W. Jackson, the contractor who built the tunnel system, received several patents related to building such shafts.

== Equipment ==
=== Motive power ===
The first test trains were run a few years after the start of construction. Most of the tunnel system was operated using overhead lines and trolley poles for power. Between 1903 and 1904, the Illinois Telephone Construction Company purchased 22 class L. M. locomotives from General Electric. These weighed 5 short tons (4.54 t; 4.46 long tons) and had two 20-horsepower (15-kilowatt) traction motors. Most of the engines used in the tunnels were standard mine haulage locomotives made by the Jeffrey Manufacturing Company. These weighed 6 short tons (5.44 t; 5.36 long tons) and had two 18-horsepower (13-kilowatt) traction motors each. Commonwealth Edison provided the electric power at 250 volts.

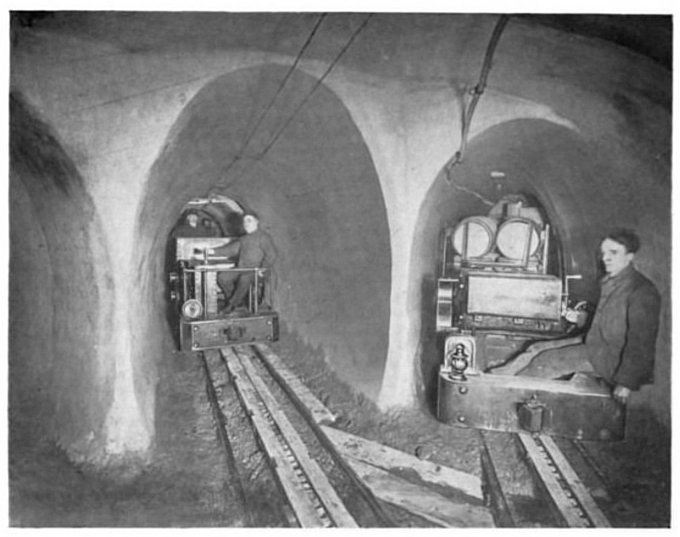
Two Morgan Locomotives posed for a publicity photo in 1904 at State and Randolph. Superintendent George W. Jackson is at the controls on the left.

On the grades leading up from the tunnel to the Grant Park disposal station, the Morgan system sold by the Goodman Equipment Mfg. Co. was used. Morgan locomotives used a central third rail for power and also as a rack for traction. This system was also widely sold to the mining industry and was particularly valuable where mines had steep grades. Temporary Morgan third-rail was installed in the tunnels during installation of the telephone cables on the tunnel ceiling, but after construction was completed, the Morgan system was only used in the context of the grade to the Grant Park disposal station and its use ceased with the closure of that disposal station.

Between 1906 and 1908, the tunnel company purchased a number of Baldwin engines. One of these, number 508, was recovered from the tunnel leading to the Field Museum in 1996, when the rebuilding of the Outer Drive past the museum uncovered the old Grant Park Disposal Station elevator shaft. While not functional, this engine and cars is now on display in the collection of the Illinois Railway Museum.

By 1914, the tunnel company was operating two gasoline powered locomotives built by Baldwin Locomotive Works on the surface trackage in Grant Park. These engines weighed 7 short tons (6.35 tonnes; 6.25 long tons) and were 12 feet (3.7 meters) long, 4 feet 8 inches (1.4 meters) wide and 7 feet 6 inches (2.29 m) high. The 4-cylinder engines were coupled to the driving wheels through a jackshaft and side rods. These machines had a two-speed transmission with a top speed of 10 miles per hour (16 km/h).

=== Freight cars ===
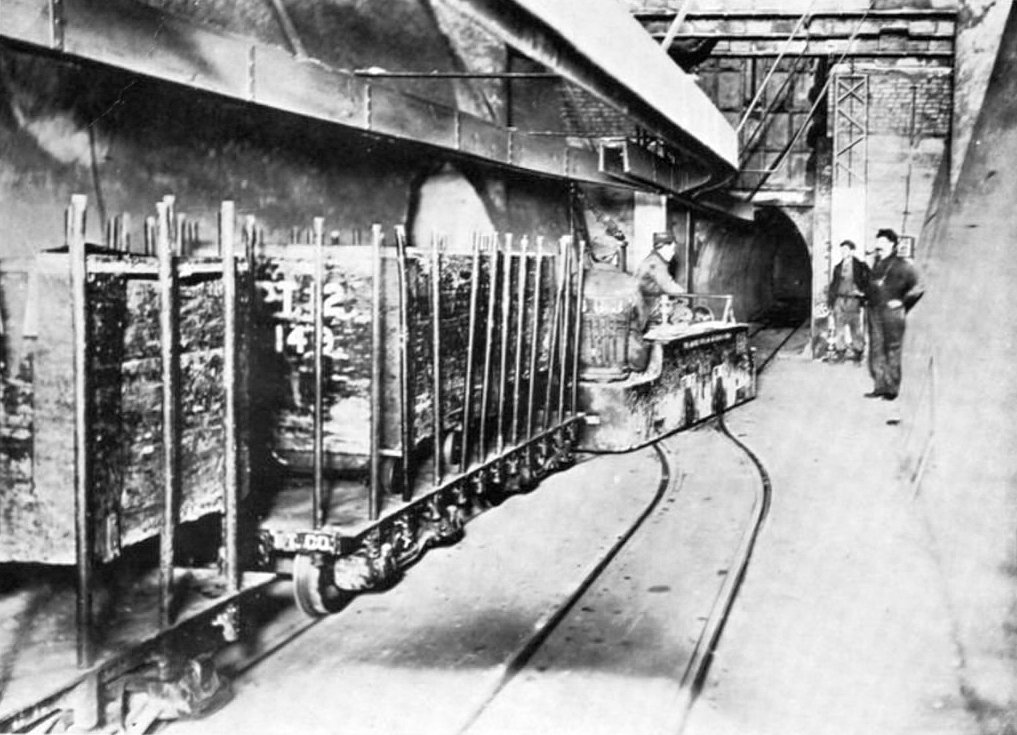
A train pulls out of the basement of Marshall Field's into the tunnel. The freight cars are made by Kilbourne & Jacobs.

The standard freight cars on the tunnel were 12 feet 6 inches (3.81 m) long and 3 feet 11 inches (1.2 meters) wide, running on two 4-wheel trucks and designed to operate on curves with a 15-foot (4.57-meter) radius. Cars were equipped with National Steel Castings Co. "Sharon" 1/2 size MCB Couplers, and were of all steel and iron construction.

The tunnel bought hundreds of Bettendorf flat cars that could be converted to gondolas and had a capacity of 30,000 pounds (14,000 kg) or 15 short tons (14 t; 13 long tons). Bettendorf's patents include several pertaining to cars that match this description.

Ash and excavation debris removal cars were equipped with the Newman patent dump box with a 3.5 cubic yards (2.7 m^{3}) capacity. Newman, who was in charge of excavation spoil removal during the early phase of construction, developed this dump box because the clay removed during tunnel excavation was so sticky that it was difficult to dump from conventional side-dump cars.

Additional cars were built by Kilbourne & Jacobs. These were simple metal flat cars 4 feet (1.22 m) wide by 10 feet 6 inches (3.2 m) long with closely spaced stake pockets to restrain the cargo.

== Operation ==
Revenue service in the tunnels officially began on August 15, 1906, with a 2-mile (3.2-kilometer) 16-minute run. By that time, 45 miles (72 kilometers) of track were in place, with connections to four railroads and 40 on-line customers. A total of 67 locomotives and 400 freight cars were on hand. In fact, coal delivery by subway began on October 13, 1905, when several carloads of coal were delivered from the Chicago and Alton Railroad coal chutes.

In 1915, most tunnel operation occurred between 7 am and 5 pm, with limited night operation primarily serving excavation spoil removal and coal and ash service. In a typical 10-hour work day, there were 500 to 600 train movements, all conducted under the authority of a telephone-based dispatching system. Dial telephones were installed at every street intersection so that engineers could easily remain in contact with the dispatcher. In 1914, the tunnel employed 568 people, including 116 motormen, 57 elevator men, 59 truckers, 74 clerks and three dispatchers. A 1916 survey showed that the tunnel carried 18 percent of the freight traffic in the Chicago loop.

In 1929, it was estimated that the tunnels handled between 200 and 300 train movements a day, with 10 to 15 cars per train. At the time, the tunnel had 150 locomotives, 2,693 merchandise cars, 151 coal cars and 400 excavation and ash cars.

In 1954, the tunnel was carrying 500 carloads of freight and 400 carloads of cinders and debris daily. There were 83 locomotives, 1,609 freight cars, 55 trucks and 272 semi trailers on hand. Surface trucking was an important part of the business, required to reach customers located outside the loop. The workforce had declined considerably from the tunnel's heyday, with just 30 motormen operating the trains. The tunnel workforce was so dominated by attrition that someone with 25 years of experience in the tunnel was viewed as a newcomer.

=== Merchandise ===
In 1914, the tunnel had direct connections for freight interchange (by elevator) with 26 railroads and two boat lines. In addition, there were four public tunnel stations where shippers could drop or pick up merchandise, and 36 industries had direct tunnel connections, including Chicago's big department stores, Marshall Field's, Carson Pirie Scott and Rothchild's. In 1913, the tunnel carried 544,071 carloads or 617,891 short tons (560,541 t; 551,688 long tons) of merchandise. Of this, 231,585 carloads were sent from public stations, 177,743 carloads from industrial customers served by the tunnel, and 134,743 carloads from railroad freight terminals.

=== Mail ===
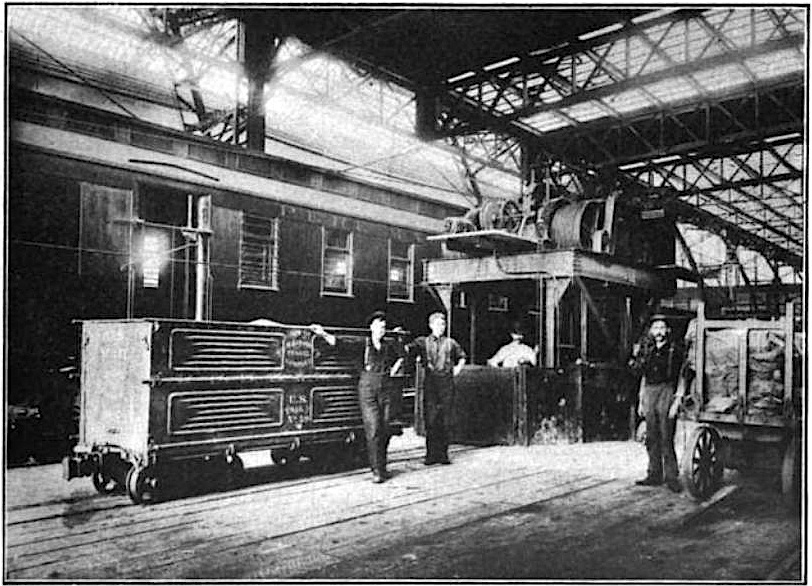
A tunnel mail car, on the platform in Grand Central Station, in front an elevator leading down to the freight tunnels. The tunnel car was one of hundreds of convertible cars built by Bettendorf.

The Illinois Tunnel Company built connections to post offices and passenger stations specifically for mail service. Tunnel mail service began in September 1906 at a contracted rate of $172,600 per year. Within six months, it became apparent that the Tunnel Company was having difficulty with timely delivery, and the post office threatened to abrogate its contract. Mail service through the tunnels was terminated at the end of the two-year contract.

In 1953, the tunnel company again explored getting into the mail business. Aside from brief experiments, this went nowhere.

=== Coal ===
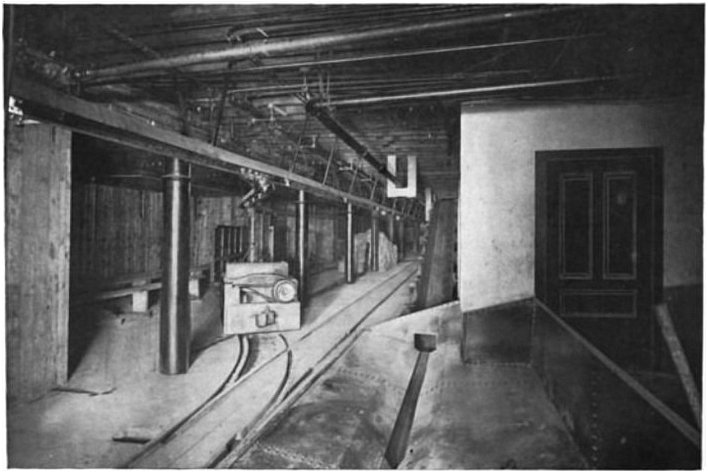
Newly built tunnel sidings in a building basement, with a bin to receive coal deliveries and a conveyor up to the boiler room.

In 1914, 22 buildings had tunnel connections for coal delivery, including the First National Bank of Chicago, several hotels, Marshall Field's, City Hall and the County Building. A total of 16,414 carloads or 57,906 short tons (52,531 t; 51,702 long tons) of coal were handled in 1913.

The tunnel had two coal receiving stations in 1915 for loading coal onto tunnel trains. One was served by the Chicago and Eastern Illinois Railroad, the other by the Chicago and Alton Railroad. Surface railroad cars dumped coal into bins under the track, from which chutes led down to the tunnel. A tunnel car could be loaded with a full load of 3 1/2 short tons (3.18 t; 3.13 long tons) of coal in two seconds.

Coal was carried in side-dump cars, from which it was dumped into a hopper below each customer's boiler room. A conveyor then carried the coal up from the trackside hopper to the customer's boiler room. The details of the latter connection depended on the depth of the building's basement. Chicago's new City building on the corner of Washington and LaSalle had a subbasement 38 feet (11.58 m) below sidewalk level, so the tunnel connection was made by a 10-foot-deep (3.05 m) trench. The Commercial National Bank's coal bins were under the sidewalk on Clark Street. There, coal was lifted from the tunnel by a vertical bucket conveyor running in a small shaft.

Before the 1940s the tunnels were used to deliver coal to downtown buildings, and to remove ash or clinkers. Trucks began to siphon off significant amounts of business, however, and by the late 1940s, customers began to switch from coal to natural gas to heat their buildings. The ones that kept burning coal switched to delivery by truck because unloading from the surface was easier, and a complex conveyor system was not required.

=== Excavation debris and ashes ===
Early operation in the tunnels was dominated by removal of excavation debris from the tunnel itself, and once tunnel service reached various areas, several construction contractors found that it was less expensive to dump excavation debris down into tunnel trains than it was to haul it out through the congested streets of the Chicago Loop. As a result, excavation debris continued to make up a significant part of tunnel traffic after the tunnel system was completed. Ash from coal-fired furnaces was freely mixed with this stream of debris.

In the early days of tunneling, excavation debris was hauled to the surface through small construction shafts and then to the lakefront by horse and wagon. By 1903, some excavation debris was being dumped onto scows for disposal in the lake. In 1904, tunnels sloping up at a 9 percent grade to the Grant Park disposal station were opened, and the vast majority of excavation debris and ash was hauled out to fill Grant Park. A derrick with a 65-foot (19.81 m) boom picked the dump boxes off the cars and swung them out over the lake to dump the fill.

The new Cook County Courthouse was among the construction sites that disposed of excavation debris through the tunnel system. Before the digging of the freight tunnels, shallow spread foundations were common using iron grillage to spread the heavy weight where tall buildings were involved. Deep foundations became almost universal with the construction of the tunnel system because the tunnel threatened to undermine shallow foundations, access to the tunnel made it practical to remove large volumes of excavation spoil, and deep basements permitted easy access to the tunnel for coal delivery and ash removal.

In 1908, further dumping of refuse on the lake front was prohibited, and the Tunnel Company responded by building a new disposal station on the Chicago River. Here, elevators lifted tunnel cars to the surface where they were dumped into self-propelled catamaran "dump scows" with a capacity of 1,000 cubic yards (760 cubic metres). The scows then took the debris out into the lake for dumping in deep water. George W. Jackson, the Tunnel's chief engineer, filed a patent on a scow fitting this description.

Filling on the lakefront began again in 1913, with the construction of a tunnel extension to a new disposal station on the lake shore beyond what was then the south end of Grant Park. Here, twin elevators lifted the cars to the surface. Fill from this disposal station created the land under the Field Museum of Natural History and the Century of Progress Exposition (Now the site of Soldier Field and McCormick Place).

In 1913, the tunnel system handled 51,685 carloads of excavation debris and 14,605 carloads of cinders and other refuse. Excavation debris and ash were billed per carload, so the tonnage is not available. A 1929 estimate put the average combined excavation and ash traffic at 75,000 carloads per year. Immense amounts of fill were hauled by tunnel to the lake during construction of Chicago's new main post office adjacent to Union Station in the early 1920s.

Even though coal deliveries were made with trucks, it was still more efficient to remove ashes by tunnel. This basically left the company in the ash removal business for the last ten years of operation.

=== Secondary businesses ===
The tunnel company had a curious secondary business, namely air conditioning, which was accomplished by selling naturally cool tunnel air to theaters above the tunnels. The McVickers, Rialto and four other theaters owned by the same company used tunnel air. Tunnel air was also utilized in the winter, as heating this air required less energy than heating the often much colder outside air. They estimated that they used less than one-third the coal they would have used without the tunnel connection. The tunnel air was a constant 55 °F (13 °C) year round.

In 1933, the tunnel company sought financing from the Reconstruction Finance Corporation to diversify into district heating, using the tunnels to carry steam pipes from a central steam plant to various customers. At the time, an estimated ten percent of Chicago's loop businesses already used district heating services provided by the Illinois Maintenance Company, formerly part of Insull Utilities Investment Inc.
