= Splitter tour bus =

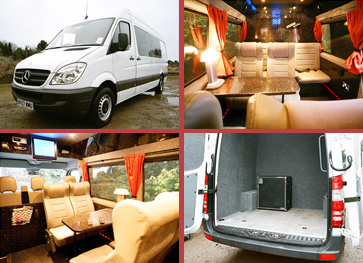

Mercedes-Benz Sprinter
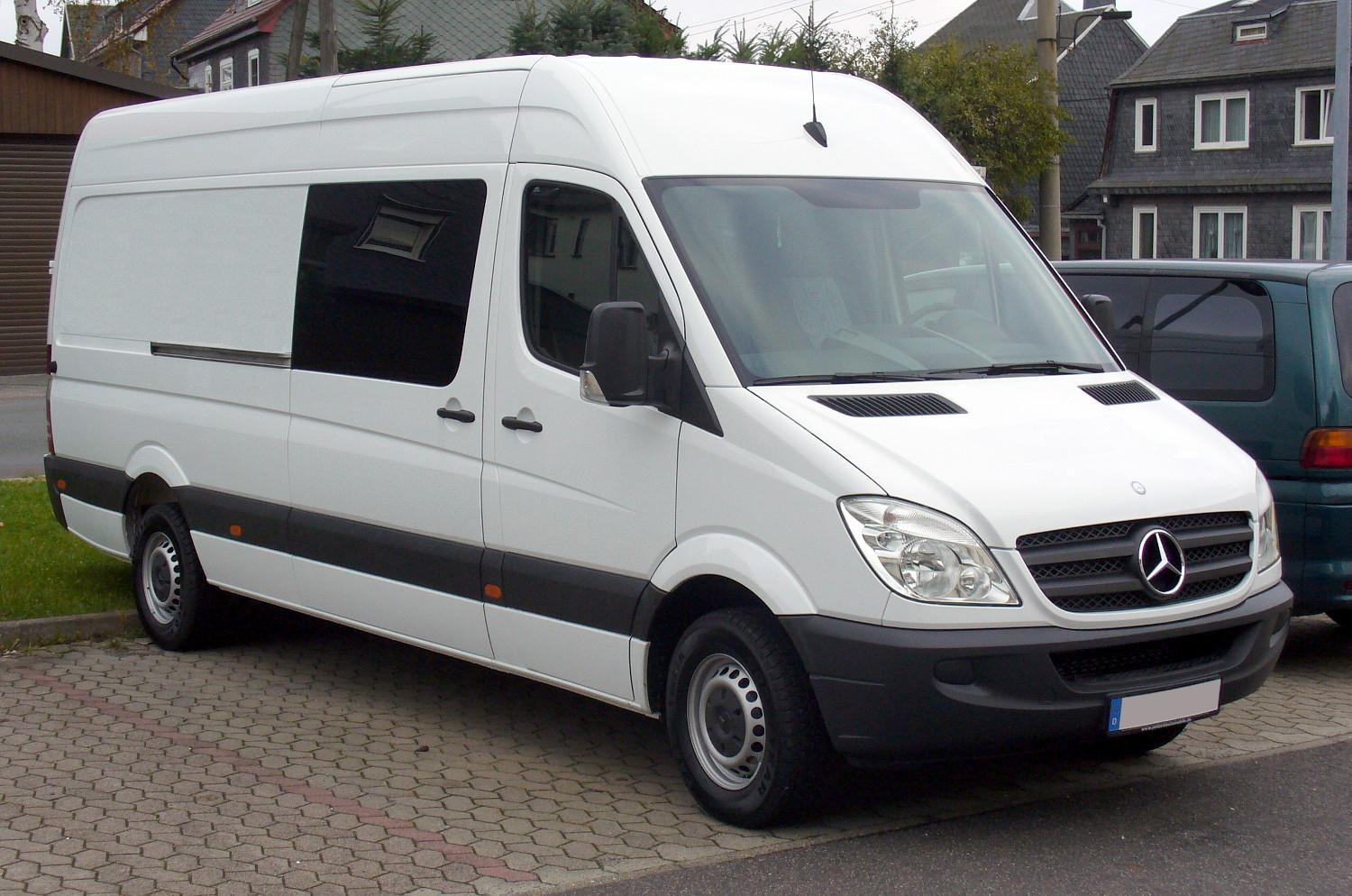

Splitter tour buses (also known as splitter vans or splitter buses) are specially converted vehicles commonly used by bands to travel on tour. Their principal defining feature is a bulkhead placed halfway down the vehicle, in front of which are situated seats for carrying passengers and behind which is an area for storing equipment. Splitter buses tend to be built on normal van chassis and the most common base vehicle used is the Mercedes-Benz Sprinter.

Splitter buses are very common in Europe where, along with sleeper coaches, they provide transportation for most professional touring acts. They are less common in North America, where the combination of minibus and trailer is favoured. The largest splitter bus fleet in Europe is operated by a company called Vans For Bands Ltd.

In Europe splitter buses tend to be configured to carry the driver plus eight passengers due to driving license laws within the European Union which restrict holders of a normal car license from driving vehicles over 3.5 tons in weight or with over eight passenger seats. Larger splitters do exist, however, with some vehicles configured to carry up 11 or 12 passengers.

More expensive splitters commonly come with entertainment packages in the passenger area that may include DVD players, game consoles, CD stereos and MP3 Player docks, or mobile internet access. Splitter buses are not produced in the factory by vehicle manufacturers, but rather, they are built by specialist coach builders. Since 2011 it has been a legal requirement in the UK and the rest of the EU to have all new splitter van conversions (whether on second hand vehicles or brand new) tested for safety by the relevant vehicle standards agency through the IVA system. All components used in the build must meet strict EU safety requirements.

== Features ==
- A seating area in the front of the vehicle
- A storage area at the rear of the vehicle, separated from the seating area by a fixed bulkhead
- Often the passenger area in the vehicle resembles the interior of a minibus
- More expensive vehicles often have entertainment systems including DVD players, games consoles, CD stereos and MP3 Player docks
- tinted windows

== Also known as ==
- Splitter Van
- Splitter Bus
- Band Van
- Splitter
- Touring Van
- Conversion Van
