= Chicago flood =

Accidental disaster in 1992

Coordinates: 41°53′20″N 87°38′21″W

The Chicago flood occurred on April 13, 1992, when repair work on a bridge spanning the Chicago River damaged the wall of an abandoned and disused utility tunnel beneath the river. The resulting breach flooded basements, facilities and the underground Chicago Pedway throughout the Chicago Loop with an estimated 250 million US gallons (1,000,000 m^{3}) of water. The remediation lasted for weeks, and cost about $2 billion in 1992 dollars, equivalent to $4.59 billion in 2025. The legal battles lasted for several years, and disagreement over who was at fault persists to this day.

== Cause ==
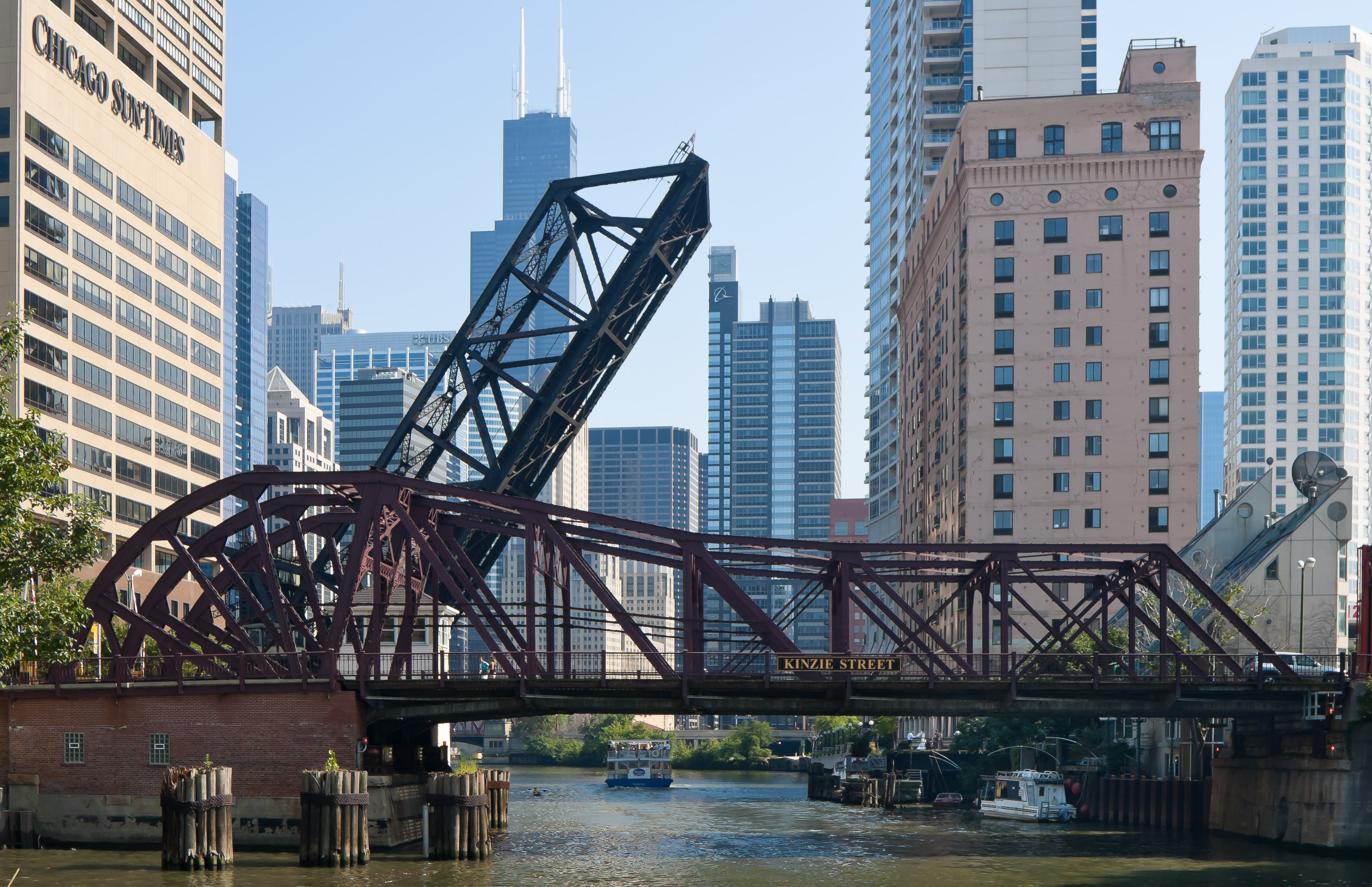
Kinzie Street Bridge

Rehabilitation work on the Kinzie Street Bridge crossing the Chicago River required new pilings. However, when the City of Chicago specified that the old pilings be extracted and replaced by the new ones, the Great Lakes Dredge and Dock Company reported back that the old pilings were too close to the bridge tender's house, preventing proper removal without risking damaging or destroying the house. The City of Chicago then gave permission to install the new pilings 3.5 feet (1.1 m) south of the old pilings. The crew members who began work at the site did not know that beneath the river was an abandoned Chicago Tunnel Company (CTC) tunnel that had been used in the early 20th century to transport coal and goods. One of the pilings on the east bank was driven into the bottom of the river alongside the north wall of the old tunnel. The pilings did not punch through the tunnel wall, but clay soil displaced by the piling eventually breached the wall, allowing sediment and water to seep into the tunnel. After some weeks, most of the clay between the water and the breach had liquefied, which rapidly increased the rate of flooding in the tunnel. The situation became problematic because the flood doors had been removed from the old tunnels after they fell into disuse.

== Discovery of the leak ==
A skilled telecommunications worker inspecting a cable running through the tunnel discovered the leak while it was still passing mud and forwarded a videotape to the city, which did not see anything serious and began a bid process to repair the tunnel. The CTC tunnels were never formally a public responsibility, as most of them had been dug clandestinely, many violated private property and the collapse of the operator had failed to resolve ownership and maintenance responsibilities. Meanwhile, the mud continued to push through until the river water was able to pour in unabated, creating an immediate emergency.

== Effects ==
The water flooded into the basements of several Loop office buildings and retail stores and an underground shopping district. The Loop and financial district were evacuated, and electrical power and gas were interrupted in most of the area as a precaution. Trading at the Chicago Board of Trade Building and the Chicago Mercantile Exchange ended in mid-morning as water seeped into their basements. At its height, some buildings had 40 feet (12 m) of water in their lower levels. However, at the street level there was no water to be seen, as it was all underground.

At first, the source of the water was unclear. WMAQ radio reporter Larry Langford reported that city crews were in the process of shutting down large water mains to see if the water flow could be stopped. Monitoring police scanners, Langford heard security crews from Chicago's Merchandise Mart (near the Kinzie Street Bridge) report that the water in their basement had fish. Langford drove to the Merchandise Mart, then reported over the air that water was swirling near a piling in a manner similar to water going down a bathtub drain. Within minutes emergency services were converging on the bridge.

== Repair and cleanup ==
Workers attempted to plug the hole, by then about 20 feet (6.1 m) wide, with 65 truckloads of rocks, cement and old mattresses. In an attempt to slow the leak, the level of the Chicago River was lowered by opening the locks downstream of Chicago, and the freight tunnels were drained into the Chicago Deep Tunnel system. The leak was eventually stopped by placing a specialized concrete mixture supplied by Material Service Corporation (MSC) and placed by Kenny Construction. The concrete was designed by Brian Rice of MSC and was to set so quickly that the concrete delivery trucks were provided police escorts. The concrete was placed into drilled shafts into the flooded tunnel near Kinzie Street and formed emergency plugs.

== Aftermath ==
It took three days before the flood was cleaned up enough to allow business to begin to resume and cost the city an estimated $1.95 billion (equivalent to $3.9 billion in 2024). Some buildings remained closed for a few weeks. Parking was banned downtown during the cleanup and some subway routes were temporarily closed or rerouted. Since it occurred near Tax Day, the IRS granted natural disaster extensions to those affected.

Eventually, the city assumed maintenance responsibility for the tunnels, and watertight hatches were installed at the river crossings. Great Lakes Dredge and Dock Co. sued the City of Chicago arguing that the city had failed to tell it about the existence of the tunnels.

Insurance battles lasted for years, the central point being the definition of the accident, i.e., whether it was a "flood" or a "leak". Leaks were covered by insurance, while floods were not. Eventually it was classified as a leak, which is why many residents still call it the "Great Chicago Leak".

== Court cases ==
In the lawsuits that followed, Great Lakes Dredge and Dock Co. was initially found liable but was later cleared after it was revealed that the city was aware the tunnel was leaking before the flood and the city had also not properly maintained the tunnel.

In addition the case went to the United States Supreme Court in Jerome B. Grubart, Inc. v. Great Lakes Dredge & Dock Co., 513 U.S. 527 (1995) which ruled that since the work was being done by a vessel in navigable waters of the Chicago River, admiralty law applied and Great Lakes's liability was greatly limited.
