= Patricia J. Culligan =

Dean of Engineering

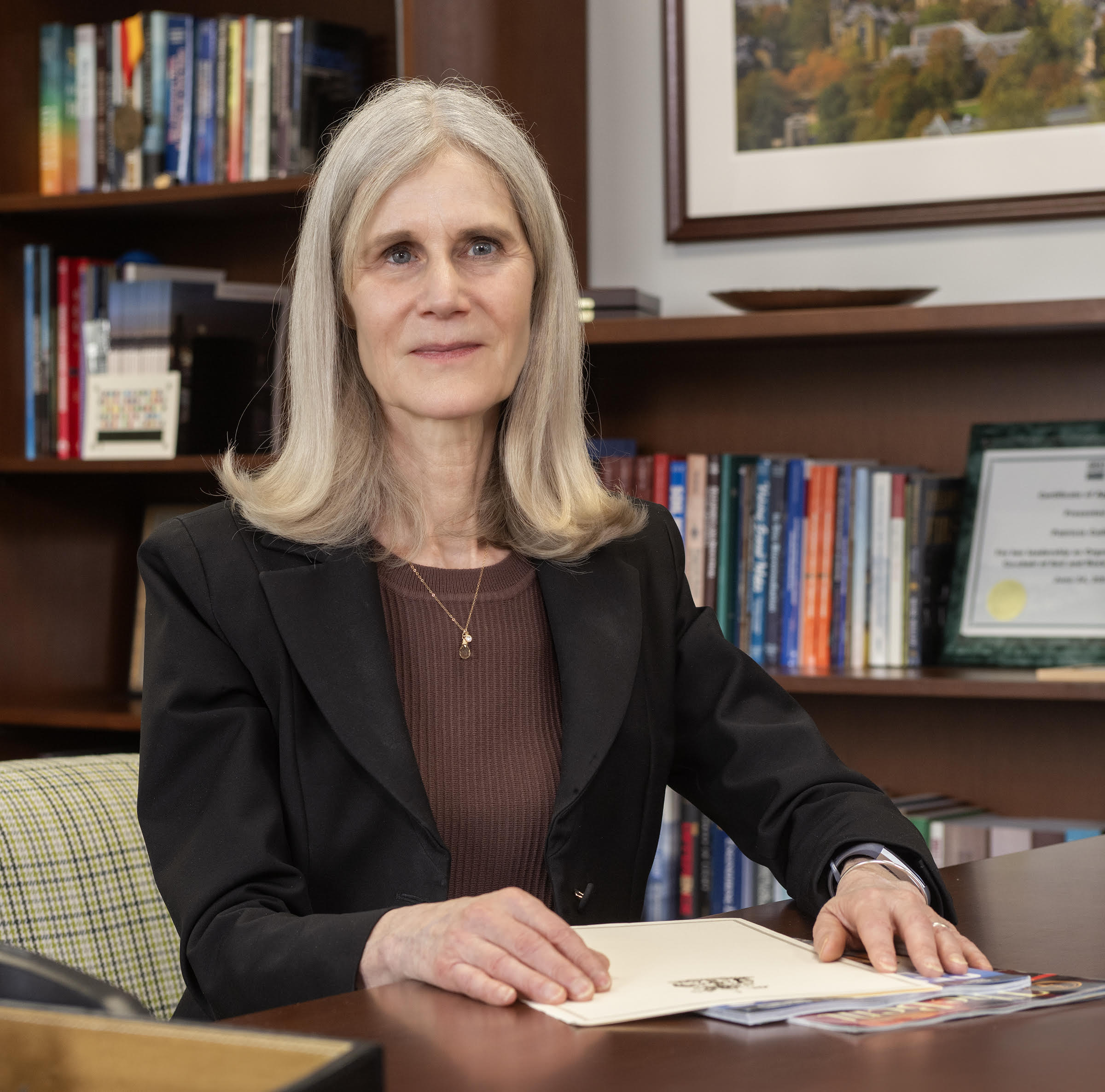
- Occupations: Dean, professor

Academic background
- Education: University of Leeds; University of Cambridge
- Doctoral advisor: Andrew N. Schofield

Academic work
- Discipline: Geoenvironmental Engineering
- Institutions: University of Notre Dame; Columbia University; Massachusetts Institute of Technology
- Main interests: Civil engineering

Patricia J. Culligan is the Matthew H. McCloskey Dean of the College of Engineering at the University of Notre Dame and a professor of Civil Engineering. She is a former Chair of the Department of Civil Engineering and Engineering Mechanics at Columbia University, and also served on the faculty of the Department of Civil and Environmental Engineering at Massachusetts Institute of Technology. She specializes in Geo-environmental Engineering, with an emphasis on water management and resources. Her most recent work is focused on issues related to urban sustainability.

== Education ==
Culligan studied Civil Engineering at the University of Leeds, graduating with a first class BSc (Hons). Following graduation, she worked for several years with consulting engineers C.H. Dobbie & Partners, now owned by Jacobs, before pursuing an M.Phil and PhD at the University of Cambridge under the advisory of Professor Andrew Schofield. Her graduate research involved heat and contaminant transport in soils. Her PhD work made use of centrifuge modeling to investigate the underground transport of pollutants. After receiving her PhD, Culligan undertook post-doctoral work at the University of Perth, Western Australia, following which she obtained a Diplome de Langue, Litterature et Civilization (avec Mention) from the Université d’Aix-Marseille III.

== Academic career ==
In 1994, Culligan started as an assistant professor in MIT's Department of Civil and Environmental Engineering. In 2003, she joined the faculty of Columbia University's Department of Civil Engineering and Engineering Mechanics, first as an associate professor, then promoted to full professor in 2005. At Columbia, Culligan served as Vice Dean for Academic Affairs for the Fu Foundation School of Engineering and Applied Science, was the inaugural associate director of Columbia University's Data Science Institute, and also served as the Chair of the Department of Civil Engineering and Engineering Mechanics. Culligan was also a faculty member of Columbia University's Earth Institute. In January 2020, Culligan was appointed dean of Notre Dame College of Engineering, the first woman to hold this role. She joined the University of Notre Dame in August 2020, where she is also a Professor of Civil Engineering.

Culligan has published more than 180 papers in refereed journals and conferences, as well as multiple books, book-chapters and other technical articles. She is a Fellow of the American Society of Civil Engineers, and is a Fellow of the British Institute of Civil Engineers. She is a Chartered Engineer (C.Eng) with the UK Engineering Council. In 2021, she was awarded the H. Bolton Seed Medal for expanding the boundaries of geo-environmental and sustainability engineering.In 2024 she was honored as an ASCE Distinguished Member for her contributions to geoenvironmental and sustainability engineering through research that advances sustainable solutions to water, energy, and environmental management. She has been featured as a GeoLegend. Columbia University established the Patricia J. Culligan Academic Achievement Award in recognition of her contributions to data science education.

Culligan’s initial work involved geotechnical centrifuge modeling and she developed many of the scaling laws used for geotechnical centrifuge modeling of contaminant transport in soils. Culligan’s more recent work focuses on issues of urban sustainability including the role of green infrastructure in supporting urban sustainability and climate adaptation, as well as challenges associated with building energy usage.

Culligan served on the National Academies Nuclear and Radiation Studies Board from 2008 to 2013. From 2011 to 2014 she also served on the board of Governors of the ASCE’s Geo-Institute. From 2014 to 2016 she chaired the National Academies Standing Committee on Geological and Geotechnical Engineering. Culligan has been appointed to seven National Academies of Science, Engineering and Medicine (NASEM) study committees. From 2017 to 2019, she chaired a congressionally mandated NASEM committee charged with conducting an Independent Assessment of Science and Technology for the Department of Energy’s Defense Environmental Cleanup.

Culligan has given the following named lectures in her field: Norma Slepecky Memorial Lecturer Syracuse University (2014); 15th G.A. Leonards Lecturer, Purdue University (2017); Ardaman-Wisa Lecture, University of Florida (2020); 23rd Sowers Lecturer, Georgia Institute of Technology (2021); 18th Arthur Casagrande Memorial Lecturer, Boston Society of Civil Engineers Section (2022); Stanley D. Wilson Memorial Lecturer, Shannon Wilson and the University of Washington (2023). In 2026, she was elected to serve as Chair of the AAAS Engineering Section (M).

== Research ==
Culligan is a researcher in the fields of water resources, urban sustainability, and environmental management. Her current interdisciplinary work focuses on the development of innovative solutions to urbanization challenges, particularly in New York City. Culligan’s research explores the potential of green infrastructure, social networks, and advanced measurement and sensing technologies to enhance urban water, energy, and environmental management.

Culligan is the co-director of the Sustainable Healthy Cities Network a research network established by a $12 million grant from the National Science Foundation, which is exploring integrated infrastructure solutions-across sectors and scale-connecting biophysical and social systems, to advance urban sustainability, health, and livability.

As the founding associate director of Columbia University’s Data Science Center, Culligan played a key role in furthering research on the application of data science to urban infrastructure. She helped establish a unique, wireless instrumented green infrastructure network in New York City consisting of green roofs, rain gardens, roof top farms and urban lawns, and combined more than a decade of data from this network with field observations and surveys to develop models to predict stormwater capture by green infrastructure. Her work also demonstrated the positive benefit of urban green spaces on human health and well-being.

Culligan has made significant contributions to the study of energy consumption patterns in cities. She is the lead author of several studies on the impact of COVID-19 lockdowns on electricity usage in Manhattan, specifically examining how work-from-home arrangements have affected energy consumption in multi-family residential buildings. Her research has revealed sustained increases in electricity usage due to remote work, while also highlighting changes in household energy consumption patterns over time.

As a faculty member of the Earth Institute at Columbia University, her research has significantly impacted the fields of geo-environmental engineering and public health. Through collaborations with environmental scientists and microbiologists, she helped develop relationships between commonly used fecal indicators and harmful bacterial and viral pathogens to enable better use of fecal indicators to identify contaminated groundwater.

== Selected publications ==
- Alornyo, Sonia; McGillis, Wade; Culligan, Patricia (2026-07-09). "From Sensors to Simulations: How AI Is Transforming Water Monitoring, Management, and Policy". Water. 18 (14): 1664. Bibcode:2026Water..18.1664A. doi:10.3390/w18141664. ISSN 2073-4441.
- Jewell, Christopher M.; Hensley, P.J.; Barry, D.A.; Acworth, Ian (2026), "Site investigation and monitoring techniques for contaminated sites and potential waste disposal sites", Geotechnical Management of Waste and Contamination (1 ed.), London: CRC Press, pp. 3–37, doi:10.1201/9781003761112-2, ISBN 978-1-003-76111-2
- Zhao, Haokai; Mailloux, Brian J.; Cook, Elizabeth M.; Culligan, Patricia J. (2023-11-07). "Change of urban park usage as a response to the COVID-19 global pandemic". Scientific Reports. 13 (1) 19324. Bibcode:2023NatSR..1319324Z. doi:10.1038/s41598-023-46745-1. ISSN 2045-2322. PMC 10630328. PMID 37935778.
- Shetty, Nandan; Wang, Mark; Elliott, Robert; Culligan, Patricia (2022-07-14). "Examining How a Smart Rainwater Harvesting System Connected to a Green Roof Can Improve Urban Stormwater Management". Water. 14 (14): 2216. Bibcode:2022Water..14.2216S. doi:10.3390/w14142216. ISSN 2073-4441.
- Fan, Wei; Kam, Kevin A.; Zhao, Haokai; Culligan, Patricia J.; Kymissis, Ioannis (2022). "An Optical Soil Sensor for NPK Nutrient Detection in Smart Cities". 2022 18th International Conference on Intelligent Environments (IE). pp. 1–4. Bibcode:2022ie...conf...24F. doi:10.1109/IE54923.2022.9826759. ISBN 978-1-6654-6934-0.
- El-Sadr, Wafaa M.; Wasserheit, Judith; Wiener, Bryan; Howard, Andrea; Hankins, Catherine; Culligan, Patricia J.; Harripersaud, Katherine (2021), Detels, Roger; Abdool Karim, Quarraisha; Baum, Fran; Li, Liming (eds.), "Implementation science and translational public health", Oxford Textbook of Global Public Health (7 ed.), Oxford University PressOxford, pp. 409–418, doi:10.1093/med/9780198816805.003.0052
- Zhao, Haokai; Kam, Kevin A.; Kymissis, Ioannis; Culligan, Patricia J. (2021). "A LoRaWAN-Based Environmental Sensor System for Urban Tree Health Monitoring". 2021 IEEE Sensors. IEEE. pp. 1–4. doi:10.1109/SENSORS47087.2021.9639788. ISBN 978-1-7281-9501-8.
- Axelsson, Charles; Giove, Silvio; Soriani, Stefano; Culligan, Patricia J. (2021-09-04). "Urban Pluvial Flood Management Part 2: Global Perceptions and Priorities in Urban Stormwater Adaptation Management and Policy Alternatives". Water. 13 (17): 2433. Bibcode:2021Water..13.2433A. doi:10.3390/w13172433. ISSN 2073-4441.
