= Notre Dame College of Engineering =

College at University of Notre Dame

Coordinates: 41°41′58.0″N 86°14′13.7″W

College of Engineering
- College of Engineering at the University of Notre Dame
- Type: Private
- Established: 1873
- Parent institution: University of Notre Dame
- Accreditation: ABET
- Dean: Patricia J. Culligan
- Academic staff: 200
- Undergraduates: 1,860
- Postgraduates: 600
- Location: Notre Dame, Indiana, United States
- Website: Official website

The College of Engineering is a college within the University of Notre Dame. The Dean of the College of Engineering is Patricia J. Culligan, Ph.D. Its graduate school for Engineering is ranked #47 in the USA and #15 for undergraduate.

== Departments ==
- Aerospace and Mechanical Engineering
- Chemical and Biomolecular Engineering
- Civil & Environmental Engineering & Earth Sciences
- Computer Science and Engineering
- Electrical Engineering

== Facilities ==
The College of Engineering has facilities in Cushing and Fitzpatrick Halls, Stinson-Remick Hall, McCourtney Hall, Hessert Laboratory for Aerospace Research and Hessert at White Field, the Multidisciplinary Research Building, and other locations on campus.

Cushing Hall was built in 1933 thanks to a donation from John F. Cushing, president of the Great Lakes Dredge and Dock Company. Cushing graduated in 1906 with an engineering degree, but had almost dropped out due to financial reasons. President Andrew Morrissey forgave his tuition and in recognition for his kindness, Cushing later donated the $300,000 needed for the new building. The hall was designed by Kervick and Fagan in collegiate Gothic style, and its exterior is decorated with the names of great scientists and engineers on the outside, and with engineering themed mosaics and frescoes on the inside. In 1977, Fitzpatrick Hall was built directly south of Cushing. Built by Ellerbe Associates, it was financed thanks to Edward B. Fitzpatrick, a New York construction executive and 1954 civil engineering graduate. Fitzpatrick's 184,960 square-feet were added to Cushing Hall's 104,898 square feet, more than doubling the school's space. Today, with its high-tech laboratories, Fitzpatrick Hall is the primary research, teaching, and computer center for the college, while Cushing is primarily used for office space. Cushing-Fitzpatrick are also home to the newly built Engineering Innovation Hub (EIH), which features state of the art machinery for engineering design and manufacturing, with machinery including automated mills and lathes, 3-D printers, robotics, metrology, computing resource, assembly spaced, water jet cutters and more. The EIH is a part of the university's iNDustry Labs program, designed to offer the school's technology, facilities, and expertise to local industry and business and to foster collaboration.

Stinson-Remick Hall of Engineering, built in 2009, is a $70 million and 160,000-square-foot building that hosts some of the most advanced facilities of the college. These include a nanotechnology research center, which include an 8,500-square-foot semiconductor processing and device fabrication cleanroom, which features industry-grade tools for production of integrated circuits and medical devices with nanometer-sized features. The Aerospace and Mechanical Engineering Fabrication laboratory is a 2,000-square-feet offers workspace, equipment, and training for designing and building prototypes for class activities, competitions, service projects, and the like. The Makerspace 3D Print Lab, the university's Energy Center, and the McCourtney undergraduate interdisciplinary learning center (a combination of computer cluster, design studio, laboratory reference center, multimedia presentation area, and study space)are also hosted in the building. Stinson-Remick Hall is LEED Gold certified.

The Hessert Laboratory for Aerospace Research and Hessert Laboratory at White Field offer a combined 84,000-square-feet of research space for aerospace research. Combined, they house 19 major high-speed wind tunnels to provide near-flight conditions for research related to innovations in flight and flight speed, jet engines fuel-efficiency, and other projects for commercial use, national defense, and space exploration. Hessert houses the facilities of the Institute for Flow Physics and Control (FlowPAC), one of the world's largest research projects focused on fluid mechanics. Other facilities are also dedicated to in aero-acoustics, aero-optics, multiphase flow, fluid-structure interaction, general flow control, hypersonics, gas-turbine propulsion, wind energy, and sensor and flow actuator development.

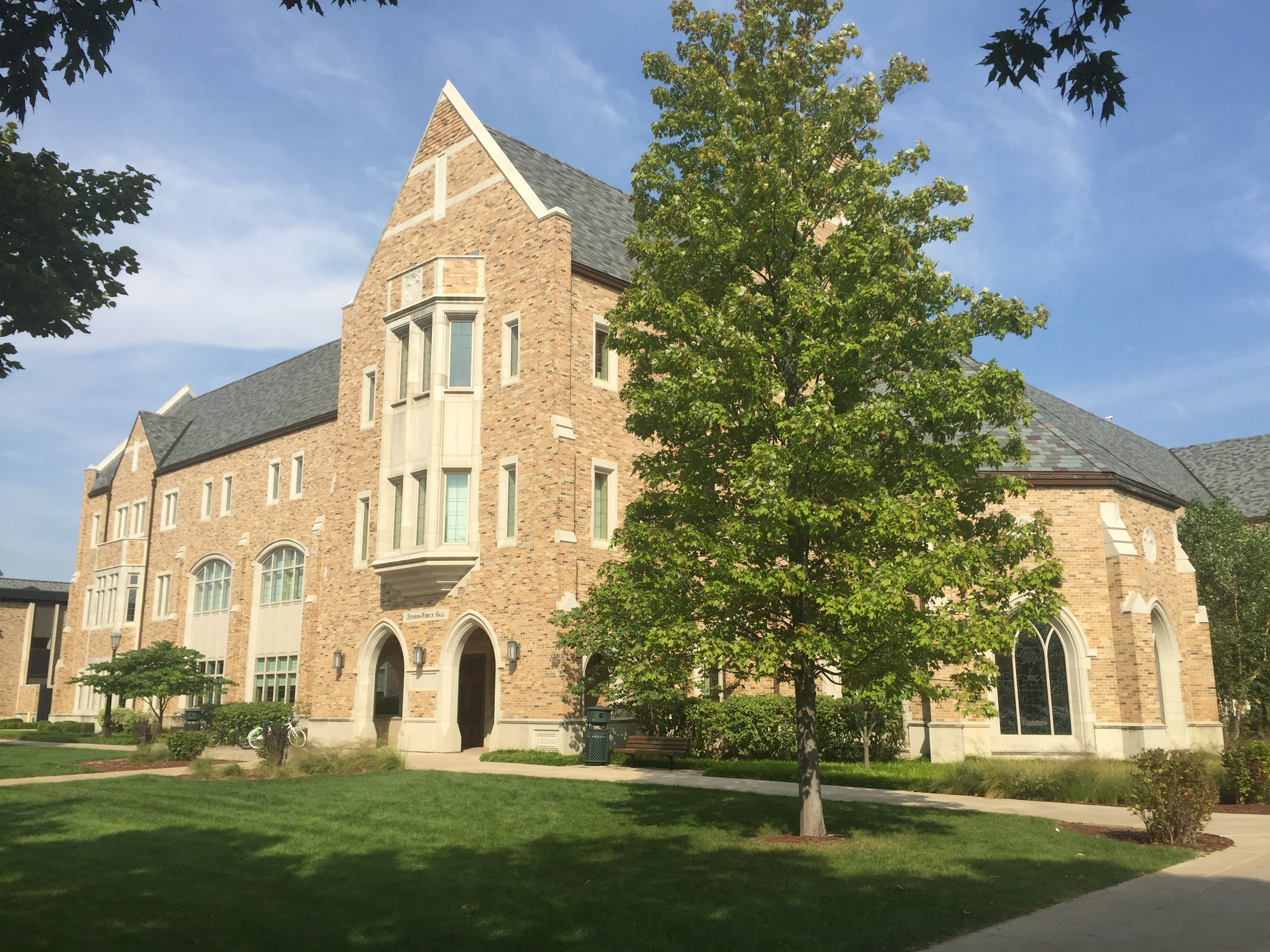
Stinson Remick hall

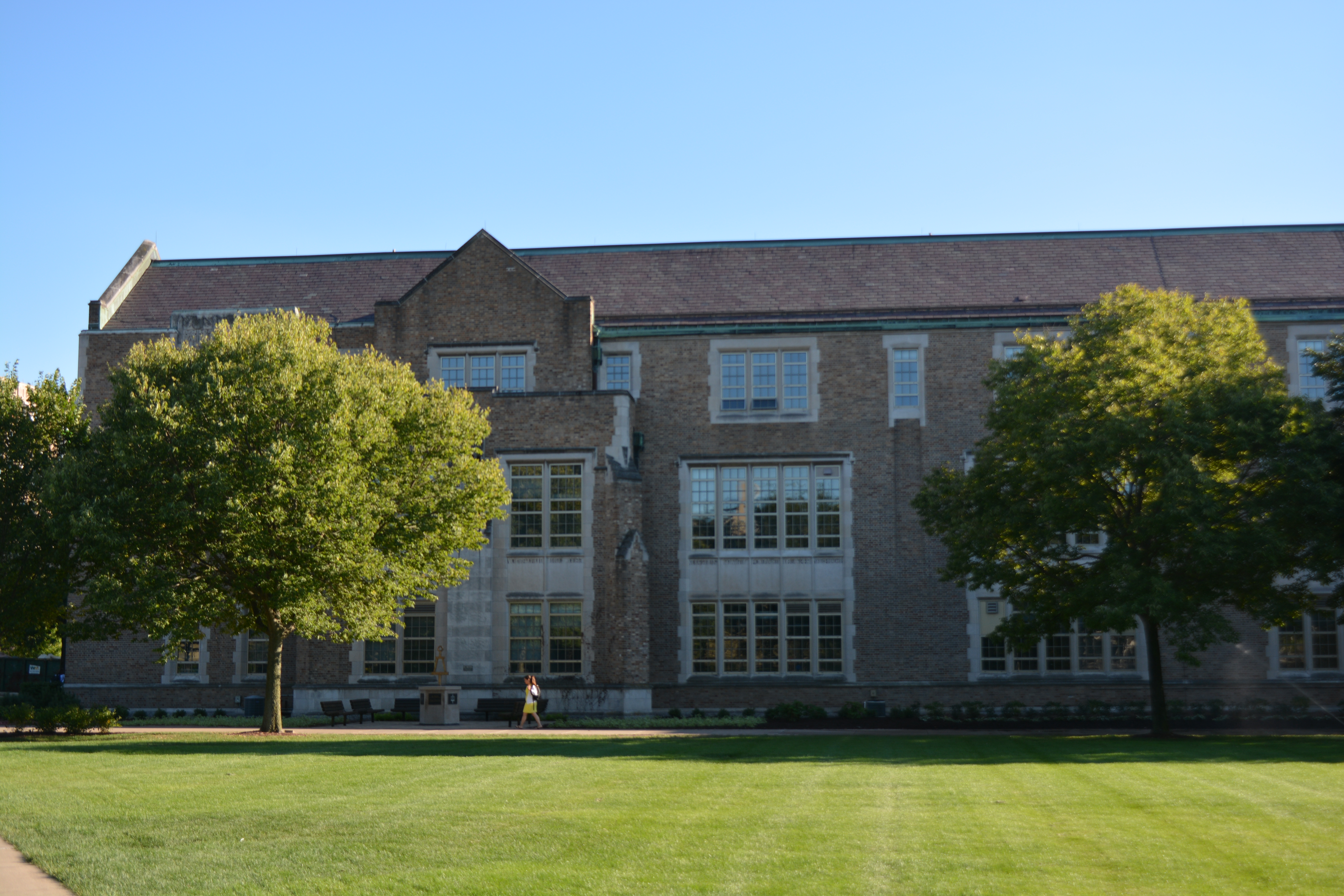
Fitzpatrick Hall

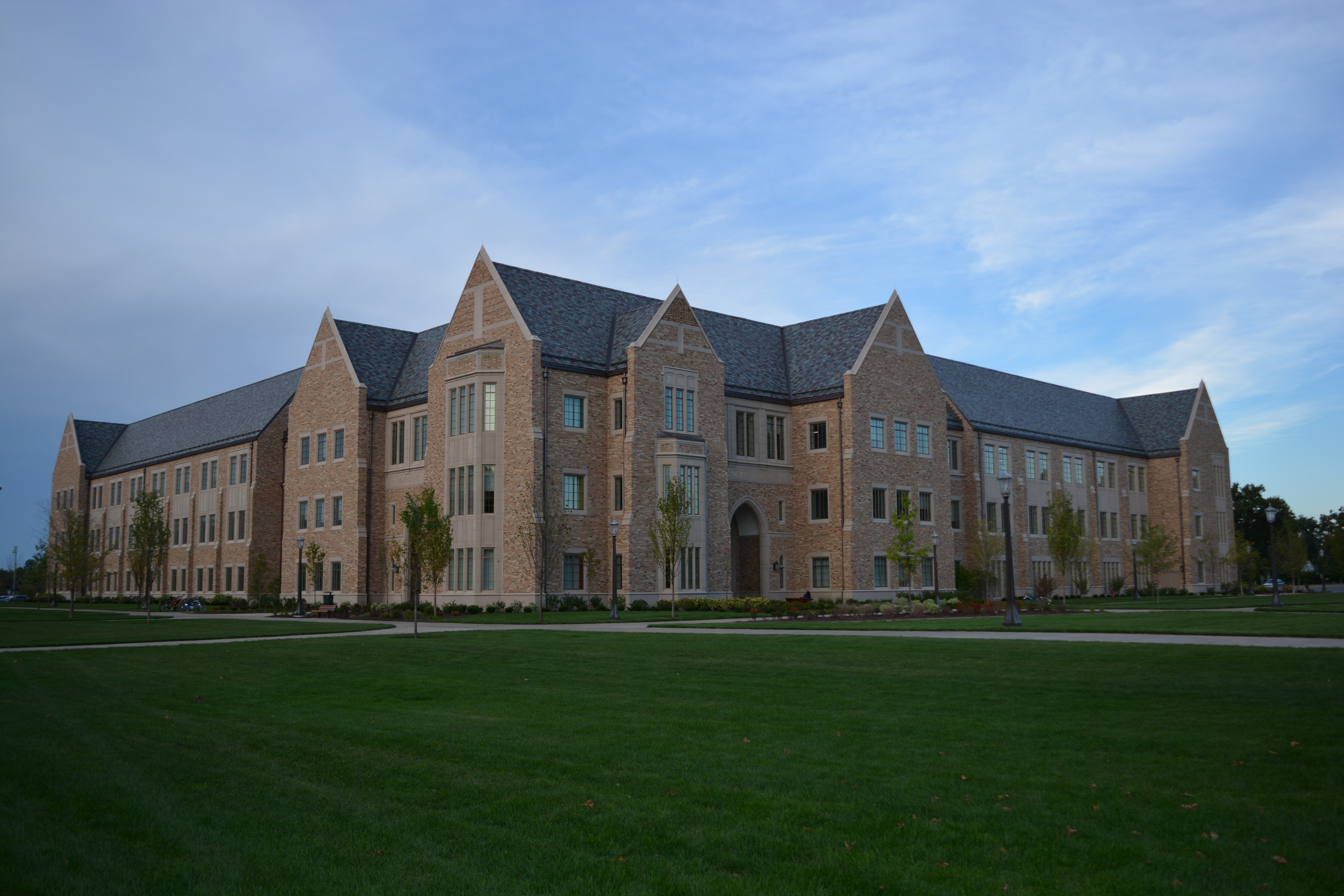
McCourtney Hall, bioengineering
