= Great Lakes Dredge and Dock Company =

American construction services company

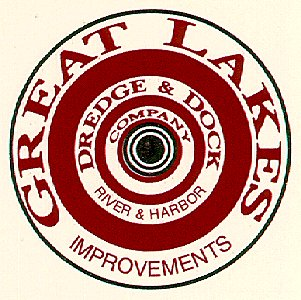
- Type: Public
- Traded as: Nasdaq: GLDD; Russell 2000 Component
- Industry: Heavy Construction Contractor
- Founded: 1890; 136 years ago
- Headquarters: Houston, Texas, United States
- Area served: Worldwide
- Services: Dredging, Land reclamation, Demolition
- Revenue: ▲$731.41 million USD (2013)
- Operating income: ▲$51.4 million USD (2013)
- Net income: ▲$19.9 million USD (2013)
- Website: www.gldd.com

Great Lakes Dredge and Dock Company is an American company providing construction services in dredging and land reclamation, currently the largest such provider in the United States. GLD&D operates primarily in the United States but conducts one-quarter of its business overseas. The company was based in Oak Brook, Illinois, but in October 2020 relocated its corporate headquarters to Houston, Texas.

== History ==
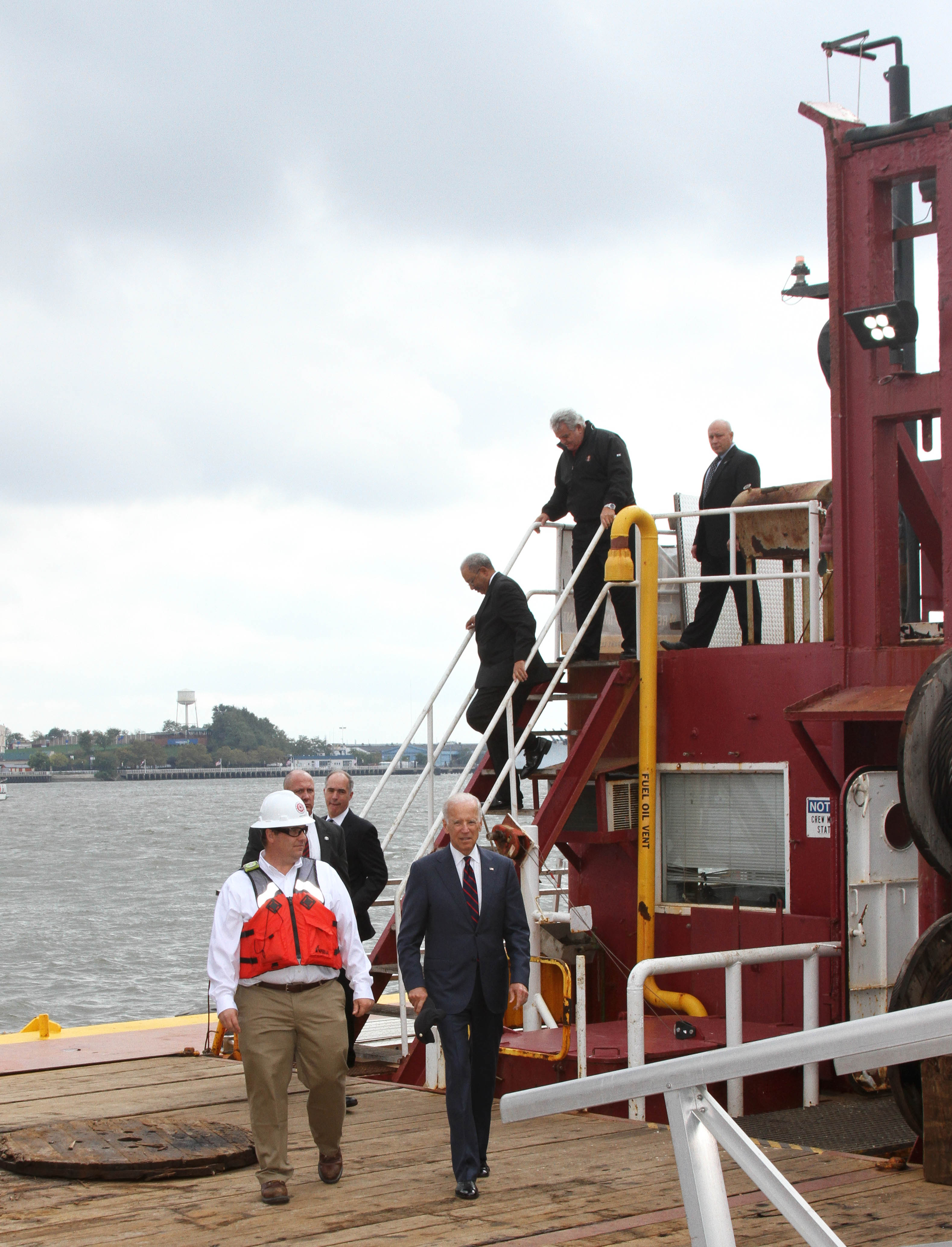
US Vice President Joe Biden aboard Dredge 54 on the Delaware River in Philadelphia, 2014

The company was founded in 1890 as the partnership of William A. Lydon & Fred C. Drews and was named Lydon & Drews dredging company. Early projects included the shoreline structures for the Chicago's Columbian Exposition. The company soon had satellite operations throughout the Great Lakes. It was renamed the Great Lakes Dredge and Dock Company (GLD&D) in 1905. Between 1900 and 1950, GLD&D undertook major projects such as the Sabin Lock, straightening of the Chicago River west of the Chicago Loop, the Michigan Avenue Bridge, foundation landfill and reclamation of the area where the Adler Planetarium & Astronomy Museum, Soldier Field, Meigs Field and Field Museum of Natural History stand today in Chicago and harbor work for the Naval Station Great Lakes.

During the Second World War, GLD&D constructed the MacArthur Lock. After the Second World War, GLD&D participated in extensive oil-related dredging in the Gulf of Mexico. In 1979, Great Lakes International Inc. (GLI) was included as a holding company for GLD&D. From 1985 to 1998, GLI was acquired by several companies to include ITEL Corporation, Blackstone Dredging Partners and Vectura Holding Company (Citigroup) until being purchased by Madison Dearborn Partners in 2003 for $340 million. It was spun off a publicly traded company on NASDAQ in 2006 after the Madison's special-purpose acquisition company Aldabra Acquisition Corp merged with it. Aldabra in turn changed its name to Great Lakes Dredge and Dock. Madison sold the last of its shares in 2009.

== Operations ==
Great Lakes Dredge and Dock conducts most of its operations within the United States and 25% of its operations abroad, particularly in the Middle East. GLD&D dredging operations consist of deepening and maintaining waterways, shipping channels, and ports; creating and maintaining (re-nourishing) beaches; excavating new harbors; reclaiming land in the water or improving low-lying land areas; restoring aquatic and wetland habitats and excavating pipeline, cable and tunnel trenches.

In 1990, GLD&D renewed its overseas efforts and created a foreign division. By 1993, GLD&D was awarded significant projects in the Middle East. Soon projects in Europe, Africa, Mexico and South America would begin as well. GLD&D also provided excavation and reclamation for the Oresund Bridge connecting Denmark and Sweden.

In 2003, GLD&D performed dredging of the Umm Qasr Port in Iraq. GLD&D also constructed a port in Hidd, Bahrain around the same time.

In June 2010, GLD&D under the Shaw Environmental and Infrastructure Group began constructing sand berms off the Louisiana coast to limit the amount of approaching oil in the Gulf of Mexico from the Deepwater Horizon Oil Spill.

A Great Lakes Dredge & Dock excavator at work on the Manasquan Inlet to Barnegat Inlet beach replenishment project, Bay Head, New Jersey, at night in July 2025

In December 2014, the company was hired to build dunes and berms along 22 miles of the Jersey Shore that had been damaged by Hurricane Sandy. Funding for the $185 million project was provided through the Super Storm Sandy Supplements Appropriations Bill.

== Legal controversies ==
=== 1992 Chicago flood ===
In 1992, a barge operated by GLD&D was driving new pilings for the Kinzie Street Bridge in Chicago when it accidentally punched into an unused service tunnel passing beneath the river at that point. The tunnel flooded, in turn flooding the basements of many buildings in downtown Chicago; the event is commonly known as the Chicago Flood. Work on the bridge was actually completed the prior year October, 1991. In February 1992 local cable company technicians discovered the breach and reported it to city officials. GLD&D was never made aware of the breach until April 1992 after severe leakage into the tunnel system had begun.

The work performed on the Kinzie Street Bridge conformed to specifications and did pass City inspection upon completion in 1991.

In the lawsuits that followed Great Lakes was initially found liable but was later cleared after it was revealed that the city was aware the tunnel was leaking before the flood and the city had also not properly maintained the tunnel.

In addition the case went the United States Supreme Court in Jerome B. Grubart, Inc. v. Great Lakes Dredge & Dock Co., 513 U.S. 527 (1995) which ruled that since the work was being done by a vessel in navigable waters of the Chicago River, Admiralty law applied and Great Lakes liability was greatly limited.

=== 2008 Liberian tanker collision ===
In January 2008, GLD&D's 117-foot mechanical dredge 'New York' was struck by a 669-ft Liberian-flagged orange juice tank vessel named the Orange Sun in Newark Bay. Newark Bay had to be closed for five hours by the U.S. Coast Guard until damages to the GLD&D dredge were mitigated. The dredge had begun to take on water and a diving crew was sent in order to make repairs. In December 2009, the National Transportation Safety Board issued a report that blamed the Orange Sun for the accident. The Orange Sun's master had not informed the captain or crew about the ship's tendency to deviate from its course.

=== 2016 Bay Long Oil Spill ===
On September 5, 2016, a marsh excavator operated by GLD&D tracked over pipeline while performing restoration activities in Bay Long, an active restoration site for the Deepwater Horizon oil spill, discharging approximately 5,300 gallons of crude oil into the Gulf of Mexico and oiling about 200 birds.

After the spill, separate criminal cases were brought against GLD&D and the subcontractor that physically caused the spill for violations of the Clean Water Act. The subcontractor pleaded guilty to violating the Clean Water Act on March 18, 2021 in the case brought against him. GLD&D also pleaded guilty to violating the Clean Water Act in the case brought against it and, on June 14, 2022, was sentenced and ordered to pay a $1 million fine.

=== 2022 Dredging 'Misdump' in the Gulf of Maine ===
On November 13, 2023, the U.S. Environmental Protection Agency (EPA) announced that it reached a settlement with GLD&D for violations of the Marine Protection, Research, and Sanctuaries Act (commonly known as the Ocean Dumping Act) relating to dredging GLD&D was hired to do for the Portsmouth Harbor Federal Navigation Project under authorizations issued by the U.S. Army Corps of Engineers. The EPA alleged that dredged material was dumped outside the authorized disposal site specified in the project's dredged material permit, located in the Gulf of Maine near Isles of Shoals, New Hampshire. Under the terms of the settlement, GLD&D agreed to pay a penalty of $92,500 and undertake mitigation projects that are estimated to cost more than $100,000 and are designed to prevent future "misdumps."
