= Lake Street Bridge (Chicago) =

Bridge in Chicago, Illinois, U.S.

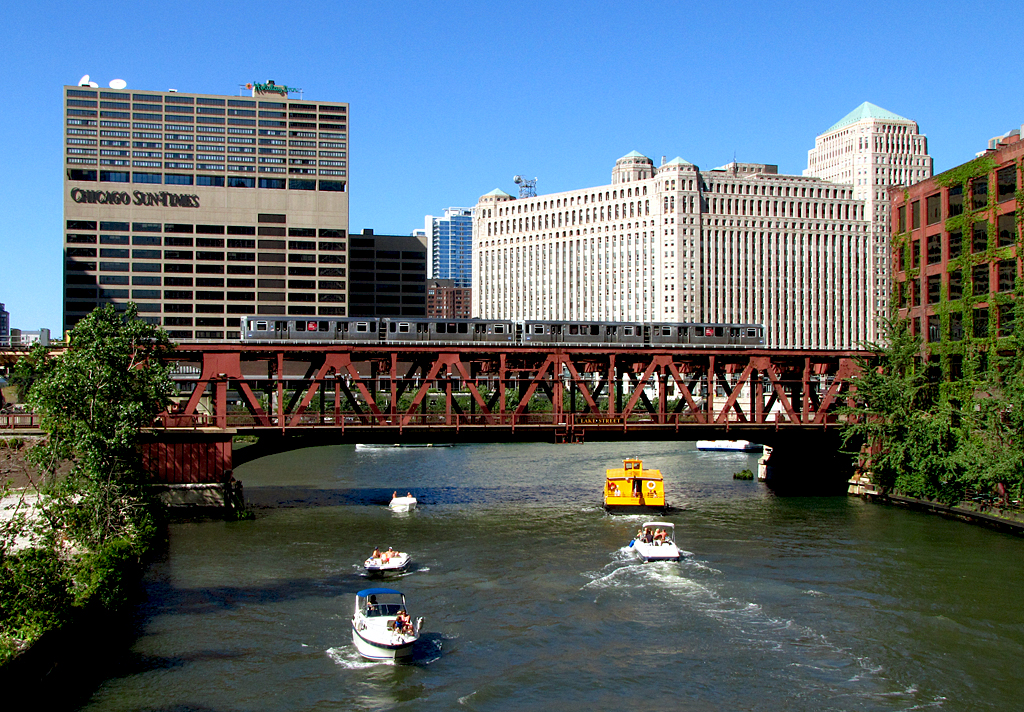
- A Pink Line "L" train crosses the bridge in 2010
- Coordinates: 41°53′09″N 87°38′16″W
- Carries: Automobiles; Pedestrians; Green Pink
- Crosses: Chicago River
- Locale: Chicago, Cook County, Illinois

Rail characteristics
- No. of tracks: 2
- Track gauge: 4 ft 8 1/2 in (1,435 mm) standard gauge
- Electrified: Third rail, 600 V DC

Location
- Interactive map of Lake Street Bridge

The Lake Street Bridge is a double-deck, double-leaf, trunnion-style bascule bridge that spans the South Fork of the Chicago River in downtown Chicago, Illinois, United States. The lower deck carries road traffic, including Chicago Transit Authority (CTA) busses and pedestrians, while the upper deck carries the Lake Street Elevated, on which runs the CTA's Green Line and Pink Line rail services to and from the Loop.

Originally opened in 1916, the bridge began a $138 million rehabilitation and modernization project in the Fall of 2025 with expected completion scheduled for January 2028. In Fall 2026, the west leaf was replaced, with the east leaf scheduled to be swapped out in the Spring of 2027. This allows half of the bridge to be raised as needed to maintain navigation beneath by larger vessels is as required by the U.S. Army Corps of Engineers.
