= Fiberglass reinforced plastic grating =

Composite building material

Fiberglass reinforced plastic grating (also known as FRP grating, glass reinforced plastic grating or fiberglass grating) is a composite material manufactured by combining a matrix of resin and fiberglass. Fiberglass grating does not corrode like steel grating and is therefore used in corrosive environments to reduce maintenance costs. It is used in a variety of applications including walkways and overhead platforms. FRP grating is a structural product that can be weight-bearing between spans.

== Types ==
Molded FRP grating is composed of alternating directional layers of continuous glass fiber for strength, with resin to consolidate the fibers and provide the shape and corrosion-resistance. Due to its bidirectional strength, molded grating can tolerate cutouts in the panel to allow pipe or equipment penetrations without requiring additional support around the opening. Molded grating has very high impact tolerance, as well as the highest chemical resistance of any fiberglass grating. It can be made slip-resistant by adding grit to the surface.

Pultruded FRP grating consists of continuous glass strands encased in resin and wrapped in a surfacing veil which protects the fibers and allows resin to saturate the outermost part of the bar as well as penetrate between the glass fibers. This ensures a smooth and corrosion-resistant surface, with a higher glass/resin ratio than molded products. The individual bars are then assembled using cross bars and epoxy to mechanically join the load bars. Pultruded grating has unidirectional strength, with its much higher glass content resulting in a greater span capability than molded products. This product is usually specified in applications requiring larger spans or heavier loading.

FRP/GRP Composite materials are replacing conventional materials and major asset-owners are fostering innovation and steadily increasing the use in so many applications. By combining fibreglass rovings with a thermosetting resin, these are proven to withstand the effects of corrosion and are highly impact resistant, and each day newly found applications are discovered. They meet the same specified load requirements as steel and are more resistant to impact.

Many resin types may be used in pultrusion including polyester, polyurethane, vinylester epoxy, isophthalic polyester, orthophthalic and phenolics.

== Applications ==
Fiberglass grating is often used when there are safety concerns due to liquids or oils on the floor and more corrosive environments needing chemical resistance.

Many applications can benefit from fiberglass grating, such as: walkways, platforms, protective shielding, machinery housings, raised floors and stairways.

In addition, Industries that use molded fiberglass grating can include bottling lines, food processing plants, lift stations, commercial aquariums, lube oil facilities, plating shops, beverage canning facilities, chemical plants and pulp and paper plants.

== FRP technology ==
Stair tread panels can also be manufactured using FRP technology. Molded stair treads provide corrosion resistance, durability, and ease of fabrication and maintenance.
