= Sleeper bus =

Long-distance coach with passenger beds

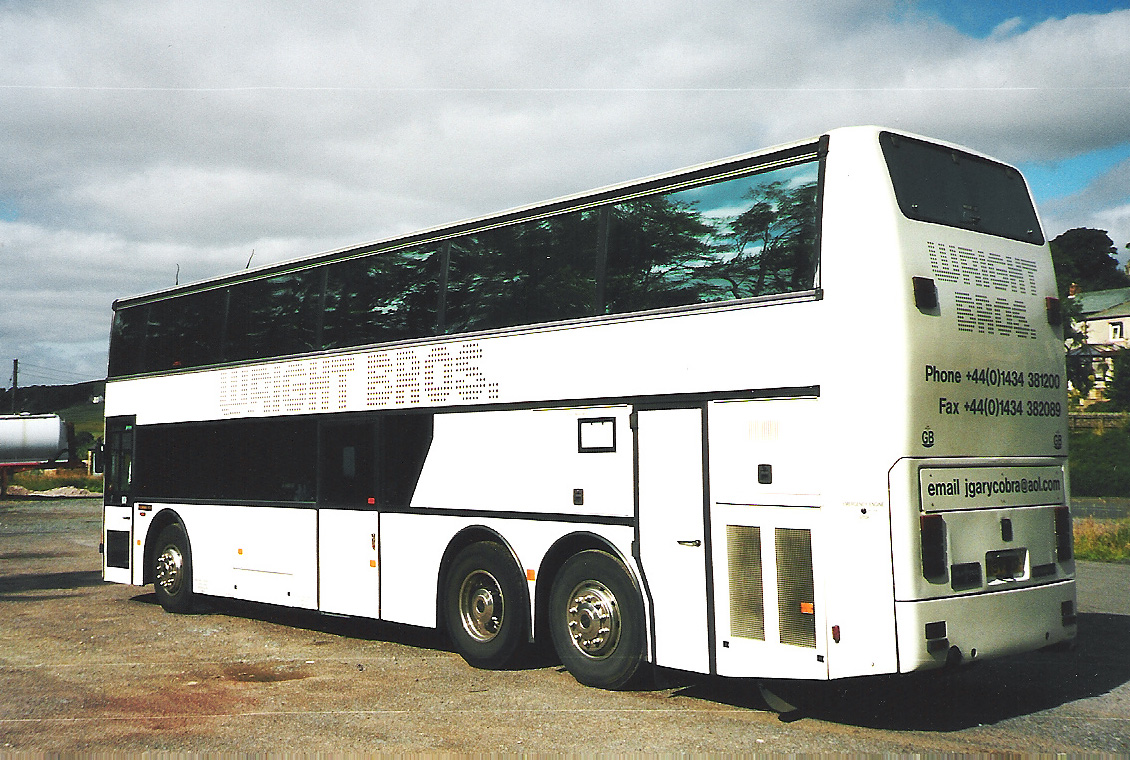
A Van Hool sleeper bus in Britain. Upstairs are 14 bunks and a lounge area; downstairs is the galley and a second lounge area.

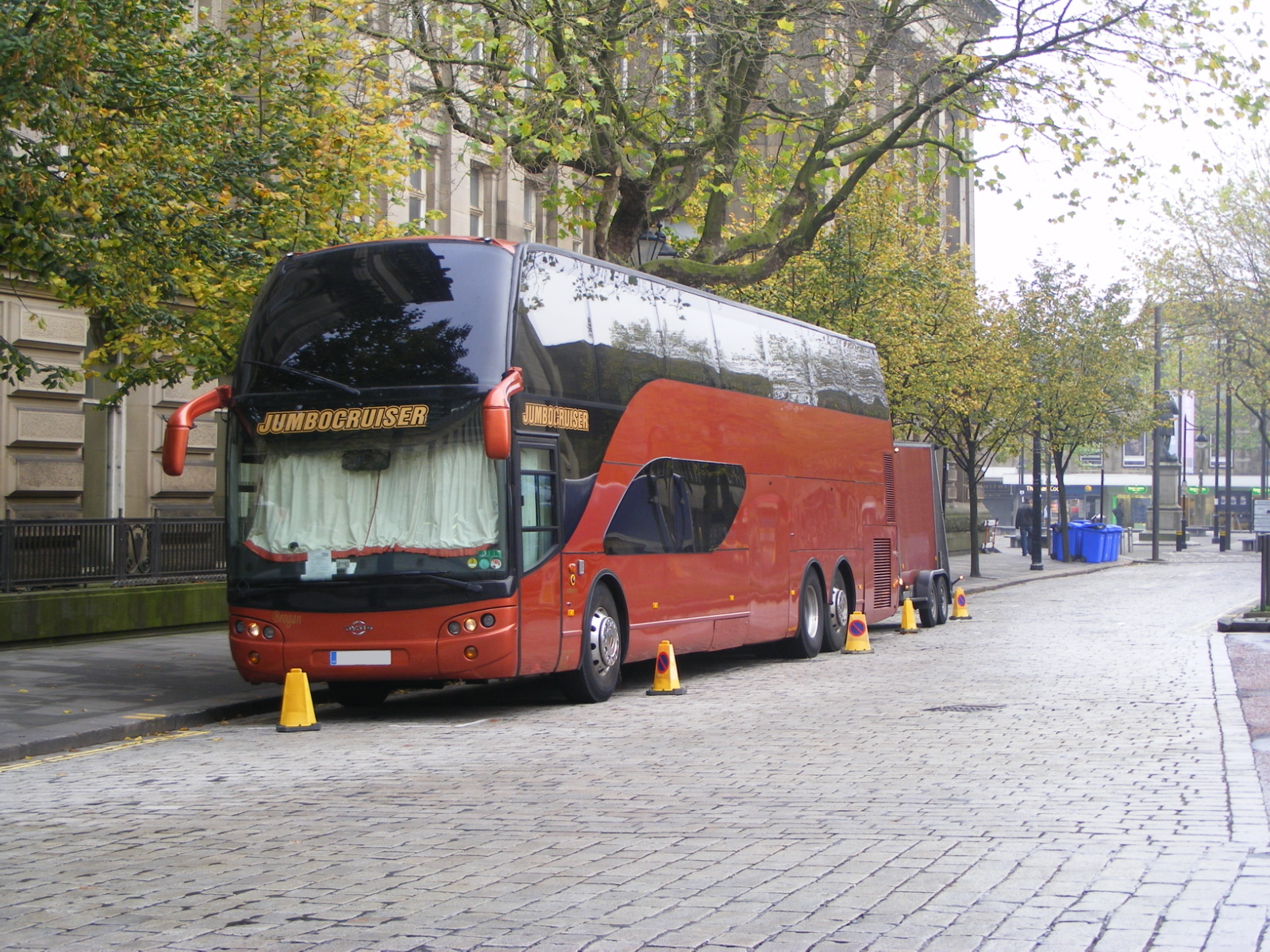
Ayats Bravo sleeper in the UK

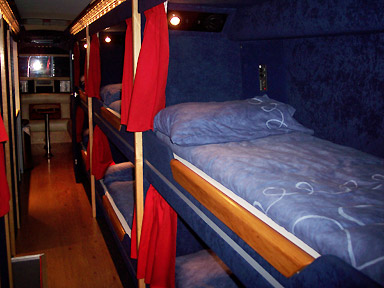
Bunks in a Jumbocruiser Ayats band bus

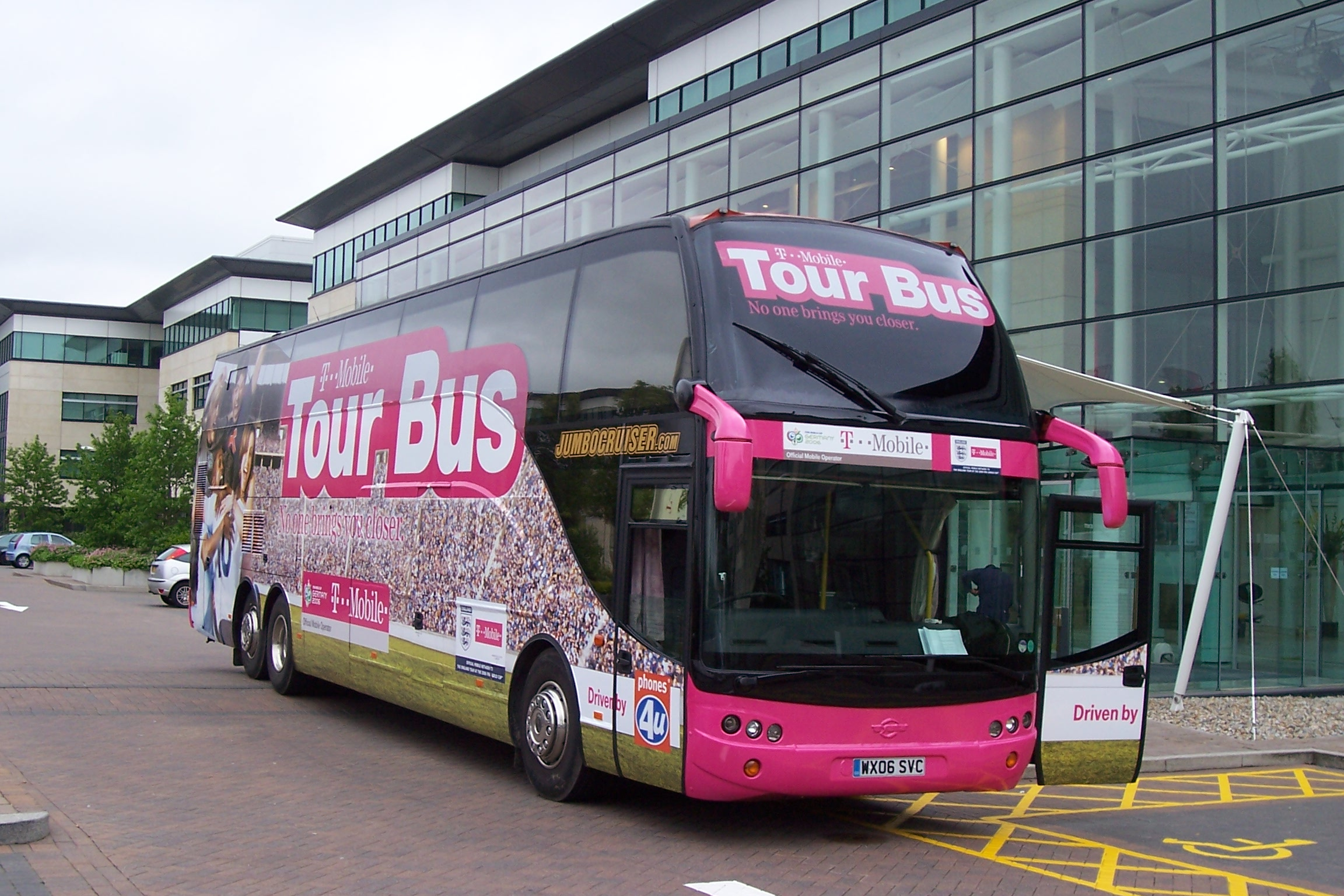
Sleeper coaches are not only used by bands. This one was used to shuttle England football fans to and from the 2006 World Cup in Germany.

A sleeper bus is a type of specially adapted coach with sleeping facilities for passengers. Like rail sleeping cars, they serve long haul passenger routes. Some are chartered to provide transport, hotel, and meal services for a group who will work together at several locations, or for tourists.

== Private charter ==
Also known in the US as an entertainer coach and in Europe as a nightliner, a sleeper bus is often used to transport bands and their technicians and road crew between cities and shows. Other terms used are band bus, crew bus, entertainer bus, NightRider, sleeper coach, and tour bus.

In Europe, such vehicles are full-sized coaches but are designed internally to carry only between 8 and 18 passengers. There are always full galley facilities, comfortable lounges and bunk beds to allow the passengers to eat, relax and sleep during the journey to the next gig or concert. Such vehicles sometimes have blacked out or mirrored windows, allowing passengers to see out, but preventing fans from peering in. They are well equipped, as the comfort of the passengers is paramount. DVD players, large screen TV, and game systems are now the norm, while some vehicles even have personal DVD players and screens in each bunk.

Well-known bands such as Bon Jovi or U2 may use as many as seven or eight sleeper buses on their tours to accommodate the many road crew members required. However, such bands themselves rarely travel on the bus but usually use air transport or limousines or a luxury splitter tour bus, leaving their crew members to travel by bus. Smaller, less well-known bands will usually travel on the bus along with their tech crew.

Sleeper coaches have come a long way from the old days, when ex-National Express coaches were retired into sleeper coach use. As of 2026, the leading companies are buying new coaches, which, after fitting out, cost over £350,000 (about US$480,000), though the rates for these coaches are not much more than conventional coaches.

Some travel companies use them as mobile hotels, taking tourists to locations where there is no hotel or there are long distances to cover overnight.

== Public transport ==
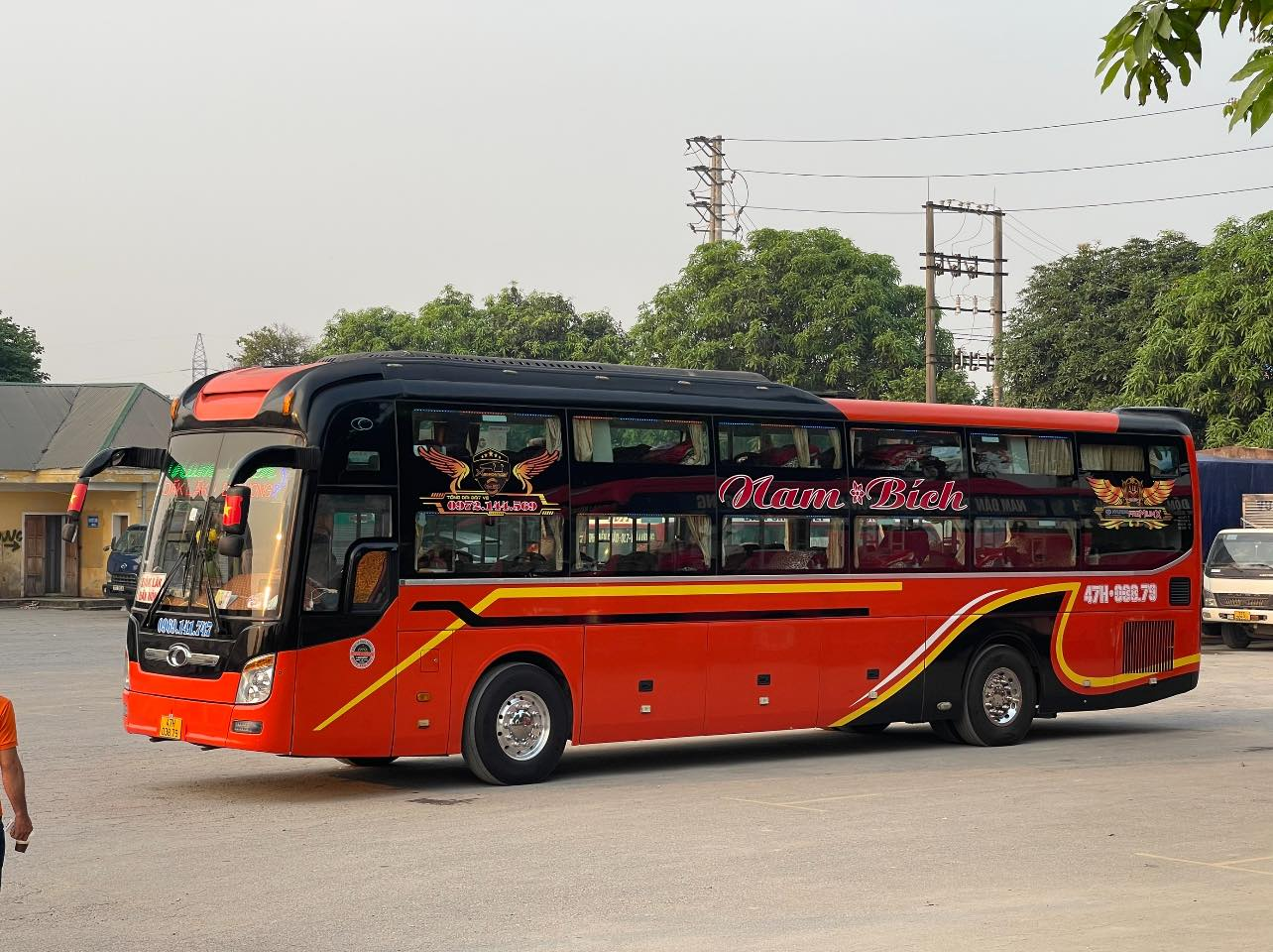
Thaco Hyundai Universe sleeper bus

=== Continental Europe ===
Sleeper buses are rare in continental Europe but the company twiliner started to operate a handful of services in late 2025.

=== China ===
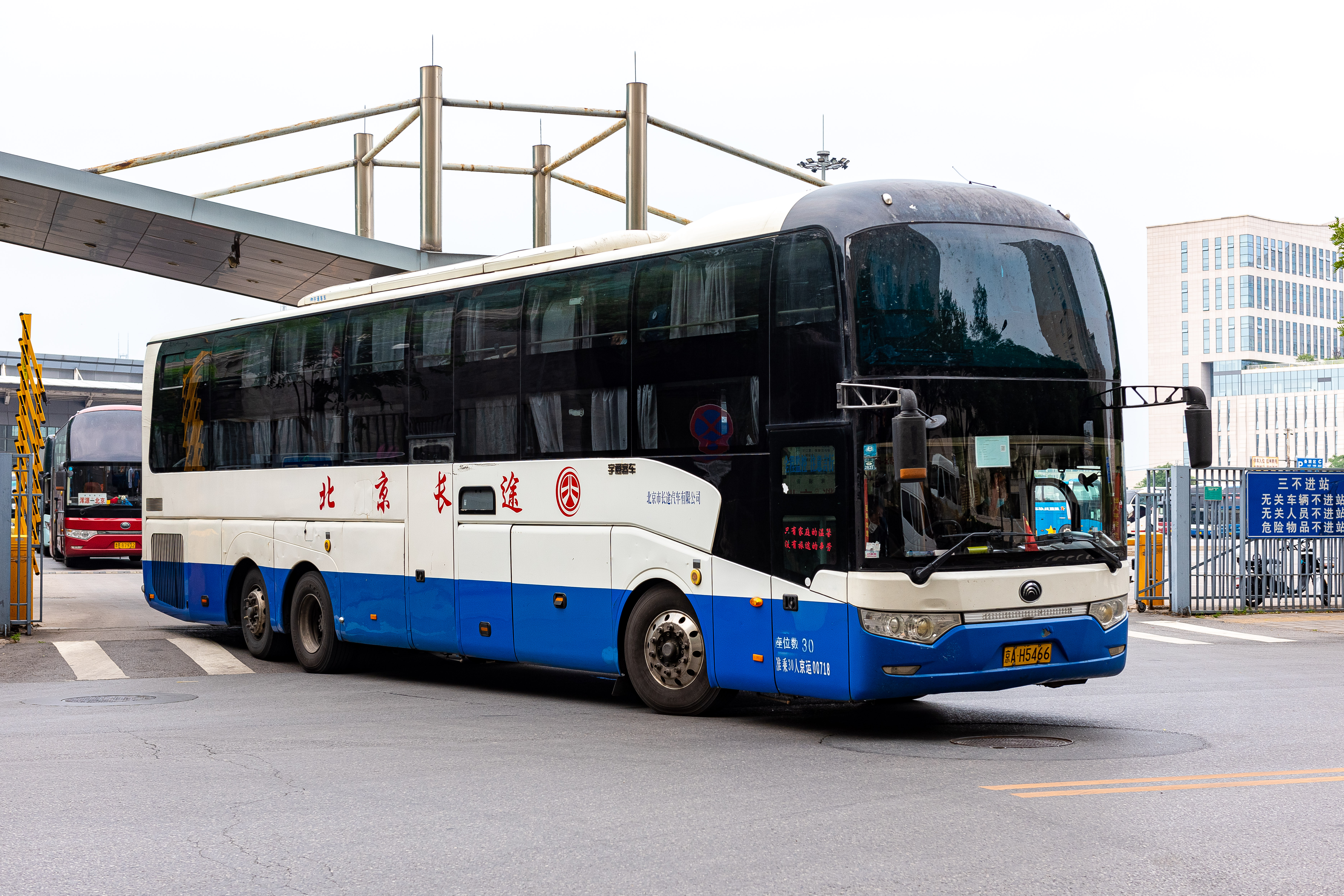
A Yutong sleeper bus departing from Liuliqiao Coach Station, Beijing, China in June 2021

In China, sleeper buses are a common means of long-distance transportation. They are slightly more expensive than trains, but also a little faster, and tickets are more readily available. There have been a number of fatal crashes involving these buses in China. Due to increased safety incidents, sleeper buses were banned from registration starting from 2012.

=== India ===
In India, these buses are used for inter city travel and are operated by both government and private bus companies. They are operated between cities which are 6 hours to 10 hours apart by road. The journeys usually start late in the evening or at midnight and are scheduled so that most of the travel is at night. This service is a good alternative to trains, as seats in trains get booked well in advance. These buses are seldom filled beyond capacity.

Several State Transport units such as the Kerala State Road Transport Corporation (KSRTC), Karnataka State Road Transport Corporation (KSRTC) and the State Express Transport Corporation (SETC) operate sleeper bus services.

=== Japan ===
Japan launched its first overnight bus service in December 2025, featuring lie-flat, two-tiered beds on an approximately 10-hour route between Kochi Prefecture and Tokyo by the operator Kochi Ekimae Kanko.

=== United Kingdom ===
Sleeper services, open to the general public, are known to have existed in the late 1920s and early 1930s. At least two such services operated, from London to Liverpool (The Albatross Sleeping Car Co.) and London to Manchester/Liverpool, run by a company called Land Liners Ltd. But the vogue passed, until 2011.

On 2 August 2011, the Stagecoach Group announced it was launching a new Sleeper coach service, open to the general public, using 'bendybuses'. The London to Glasgow service was operated under the Megabus brand and offered overnight travel on a budget. Trial journeys started on 5 September 2011. The service officially started on 21 October 2011. The service was axed on 21 May 2017 with the company stating that while "the service was popular, unfortunately, the overall level of demand dropped".

=== United States ===
Sleeper buses have existed in the United States since the 1920s. the first sleeper bus was put in service in California, with the second running in Greyhound Lines service from Minneapolis to Chicago in 1928. This bus was built by C.H. Will Motors Corporation of Minneapolis and contained eight sleeping berths.

A San Francisco–Los Angeles sleeper bus began operation in July 2017. Operation was paused in January 2019 due to dissatisfaction with the bumpiness of the ride quality, and was relaunched in September 2019 with improved vehicles. In 2020, due to the COVID-19 pandemic, the company switched from providing scheduled bus service to offering private charters.

== See also ==
- List of buses
- Sleeping car
