= Kinzie Street Bridge =

Bridge in Chicago that opened in 1909

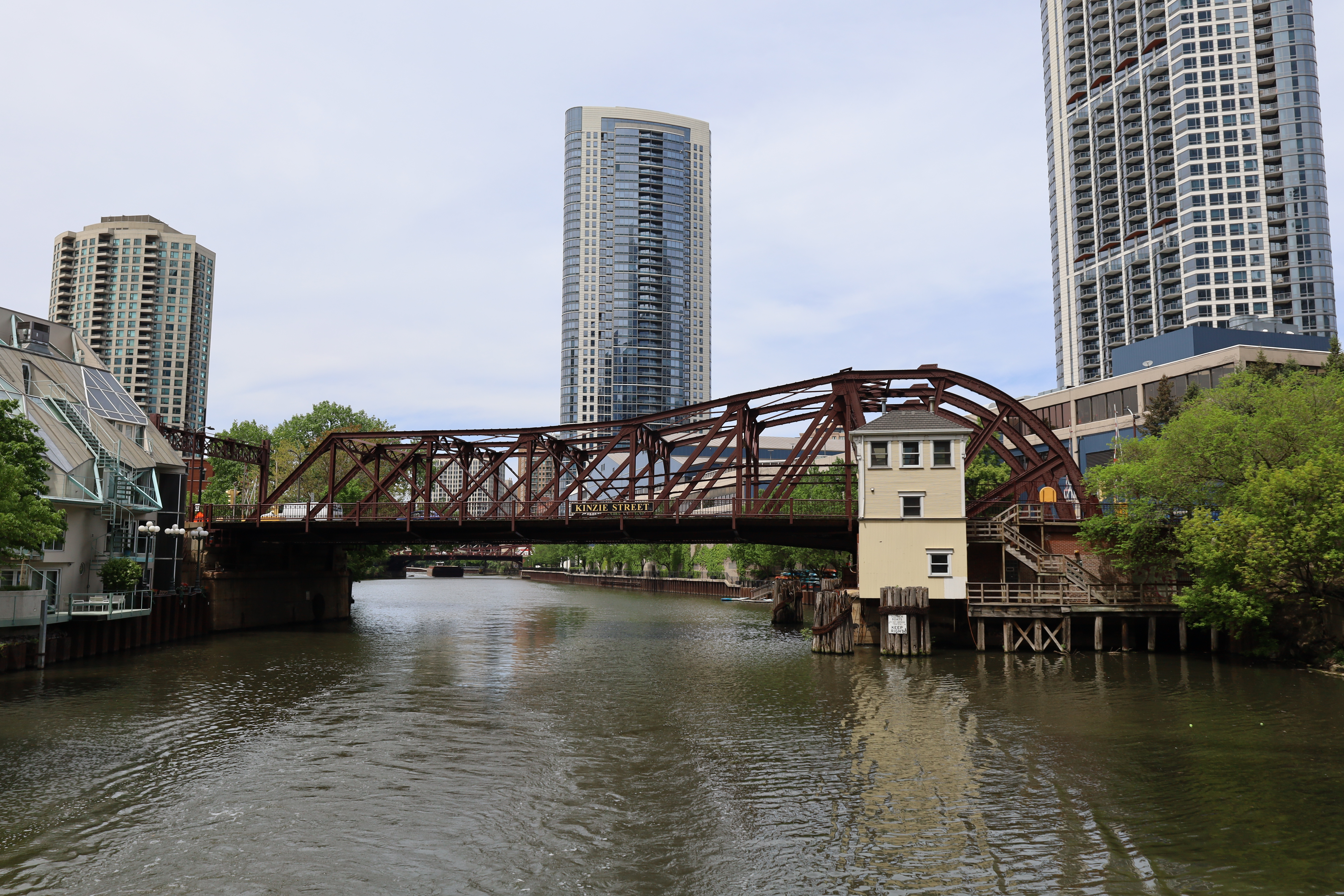
- The bridge across in 2023
- Coordinates: 41°53′21″N 87°38′22″W
- Crosses: Chicago River
- Named for: John Kinzie
- Owner: City of Chicago
- ID number: 16602826628
- Preceded by: Grand Avenue Bridge
- Followed by: Lake Street Bridge

Characteristics
- Design: Bascule Pratt through truss
- Total length: 195 feet (59 m)
- Width: 60 feet (18 m)
- Longest span: 136.2 feet (41.5 m)
- No. of spans: 1 main span and 2 approach spans
- Load limit: 48.5 tons
- No. of lanes: 4

History
- Designer: Alexander von Babo, City of Chicago
- Constructed by: John J. Gallery
- Construction start: 23 January 1908
- Construction end: 10 May 1909
- Construction cost: $218,707.86
- Opened: 1909
- Rebuilt: 1999

Statistics
- Daily traffic: 6,650 (As of 2014)

Location
- Interactive map of Kinzie Street Bridge

The Kinzie Street Bridge is a single-leaf bascule bridge built in 1909 that spans the Chicago River in downtown Chicago, Illinois, United States.

== Incidents ==
In April 1992, rehabilitation work on the pilings for the bridge damaged a freight tunnel located under the Chicago River. The tunnel breach eventually led to the Chicago flood, which flooded the Chicago Loop with an estimated 250 million US gallons (1,000,000 m^{3}) of water.

In August 2004, a Dave Matthews Band tour bus passing over the bridge dumped 800 pounds of human waste through the open metal grate bridge deck into the Chicago River. The waste landed on an architecture tour cruise boat and passengers passing under the bridge at that time.
