= List of bridges documented by the Historic American Engineering Record in Illinois =

This is a list of bridges documented by the Historic American Engineering Record in the U.S. state of Illinois.

== Bridges ==
Survey No.	Name (as assigned by HAER)	Status	Type	Built	Documented	Carries	Crosses	Location	County	Coordinates
IA-3	Keokuk and Hamilton Bridge	Extant	Swing span	1916	1982	Keokuk Junction Railway	Mississippi River	Hamilton, Illinois, and Keokuk, Iowa	Hancock County, Illinois, and Lee County, Iowa	40°23′28″N 91°22′24″W
IA-20	Burlington Bridge (Note: See also HAER No. NE-2, "Nebraska City Bridge" for additional documentation)	Replaced	Swing span	1893	1985	BNSF Railway	Mississippi River	Gulfport, Illinois, and Burlington, Iowa	Henderson County, Illinois, and Des Moines County, Iowa	40°47′55″N 91°05′31″W
IA-21	MacArthur Bridge	Replaced	Cantilever	1917	1987	US 34	Mississippi River	Gulfport, Illinois, and Burlington, Iowa	Henderson County, Illinois, and Des Moines County, Iowa	40°48′43″N 91°05′44″W
IA-62	Fort Madison Bridge	Extant	Swing span	1927	1995	IL 9 / Iowa 2	Mississippi River	Niota, Illinois, and Fort Madison, Iowa	Hancock County, Illinois, and Lee County, Iowa	40°37′37″N 91°17′45″W
IA-73	Centennial Bridge	Extant	Steel arch	1940	1995	US 61	Mississippi River	Rock Island, Illinois, and Davenport, Iowa	Rock Island County, Illinois, and Scott County, Iowa	41°30′54″N 90°34′54″W
IL-9	Pecatonica River Bridge	Replaced	Pratt truss	1879	1982	West Winneshiek Road	Pecatonica River	Harlem Township	Stephenson	42°20′35″N 89°41′10″W
IL-11	London Mills Bridge	Replaced	Pratt truss	1883	1983	County Highway 39	Spoon River	London Mills	Fulton and Knox	40°42′49″N 90°15′58″W
IL-13	Indian Ford Bridge	Replaced	Pratt truss	1917	1984	County Highway 20	Spoon River	London Mills	Fulton	40°41′50″N 90°17′24″W
IL-14	Ravine Bluffs Development Bridge	Replaced	Reinforced concrete girder	1915	1996	Sylvan Road	Ravine	Glencoe	Cook	42°08′40″N 87°45′47″W
IL-16-B	Lockport Historic District, Stone Arch Bridge	Demolished	Stone arch	1869	1984	West Ninth Street	Des Plaines River	Lockport	Will	41°35′28″N 88°03′52″W
IL-16-D	Lockport Historic District, Chicago Sanitary and Ship Canal, Swing Bridge	Demolished	Swing span	1905	1984	Division Street	Chicago Sanitary and Ship Canal	Lockport	Will	41°34′57″N 88°04′08″W
IL-20-P	Rock Island Arsenal, Rock Island Bridge	Extant	Swing span	1896	1985		Mississippi River	Rock Island, Illinois, and Davenport, Iowa	Rock Island County, Illinois, and Scott County, Iowa	41°31′09″N 90°34′01″W
IL-21	Alton Bridge	Demolished	Swing span	1894	1985	Former Alton Railroad	Mississippi River	Alton, Illinois, and West Alton, Missouri	Madison County, Illinois, and St. Charles County, Missouri	38°52′53″N 90°11′09″W
IL-22	Vieley Bridge	Replaced	Bowstring arch truss	1880	1985	N 2500 E Road (Township Road 220D)	North Fork of Vermilion River	Saunemin	Livingston	40°49′52″N 88°27′04″W
IL-34	Keithsburg Bridge	Abandoned	Bowstring arch truss	1870s	1988	Along the line of 16th Street	Pope Creek	Keithsburg	Mercer	41°06′26″N 90°55′45″W
IL-35	Delray Bridge	Replaced	Whipple truss	1883	1988	CR 1200 N (County Highway 47)	Spring Creek	Delrey	Iroquois	40°40′42″N 88°00′28″W
IL-36	Cairo Bridge	Replaced	Whipple truss	1889		Canadian National Railway	Ohio River	Cairo, Illinois, and Wickliffe, Kentucky	Alexander County, Illinois, and Ballard County, Kentucky	37°01′23″N 89°10′32″W
IL-37	Chicago River Bascule Bridge, Michigan Avenue	Extant	Simple trunnion bascule	1920	1987	North Michigan Avenue	Chicago River	Chicago	Cook	41°53′20″N 87°37′28″W
IL-38	Chicago River Bascule Bridge, Washington Street	Extant	Simple trunnion bascule	1930	1987	West Washington Street	South Branch of Chicago River	Chicago	Cook	41°53′00″N 87°38′17″W
IL-39	Santa Fe Railroad, Sanitary and Ship Canal Bridge	Extant	Swing span	1899	1988	BNSF Railway	Sanitary and Ship Canal	Chicago	Cook	41°48′20″N 87°47′16″W
IL-40	Western Avenue, Sanitary and Ship Canal Bridge	Extant	Vertical-lift bridge	1940	1988	Western Avenue	Sanitary and Ship Canal	Chicago	Cook	41°39′08″N 87°40′48″W
IL-41	Romeo Road, Sanitary and Ship Canal Bridge	Replaced	Swing span	1899	1988	East Romeo Road	Sanitary and Ship Canal	Romeoville	Will	41°38′26″N 88°03′37″W
IL-48	Chicago River Bascule Bridge, Wabash Avenue	Extant	Simple trunnion bascule	1930	1987	North Wabash Avenue	Chicago River	Chicago	Cook	41°53′17″N 87°37′37″W
IL-49	Illinois Central Railroad, Illinois River Bridge	Extant	Parker truss	1893	1988	Former Illinois Central Railroad	Illinois River	LaSalle	LaSalle	41°19′21″N 89°04′58″W
IL-50	Chicago River Bridge, Cermak Road	Extant	Rolling lift (Scherzer) bascule	1906	1988	West Cermak Road	South Branch of Chicago River	Chicago	Cook	41°51′10″N 87°38′26″W
IL-51	Chicago River Bridge, West Adams Street	Extant	Simple trunnion bascule	1926	1987	West Adams Street	South Branch of Chicago River	Chicago	Cook	41°52′46″N 87°38′17″W
IL-52	Chicago River Bascule Bridge, Wells Street	Extant	Simple trunnion bascule	1922	1987	North Wells Street	Chicago River	Chicago	Cook	41°53′15″N 87°38′02″W
IL-53	Chicago River Bascule Bridge, Monroe Street	Extant	Simple trunnion bascule	1919	1987	West Monroe Street	South Branch of Chicago River	Chicago	Cook	41°52′50″N 87°38′18″W
IL-54	Chicago River Bascule Bridge, Outer Drive	Extant	Simple trunnion bascule	1937	1987	US 41 (North Lake Shore Drive)	Chicago River	Chicago	Cook	41°53′18″N 87°36′51″W
IL-55	Chicago River Bascule Bridge, Jackson Boulevard	Extant	Simple trunnion bascule	1916	1987	West Jackson Boulevard	South Branch of Chicago River	Chicago	Cook	41°52′41″N 87°38′16″W
IL-56	Shippingsport Bridge	Replaced	Vertical-lift bridge	1929	1988	IL 351 (former US 51)	Illinois River	LaSalle	LaSalle	41°18′52″N 89°05′30″W
IL-58	Des Plaines River Bridge	Extant	Rolling lift (Scherzer) bascule	1932	1988	US 30 (West Jefferson Street)	Des Plaines River	Joliet	Will	41°31′30″N 88°05′12″W
IL-59	Santa Fe Railroad, Illinois and Michigan Canal Bridge	Extant	Warren truss	1935	1988	BNSF Railway	Illinois and Michigan Canal	Joliet	Will	41°32′21″N 88°04′56″W
IL-60	Rock Island Railroad, Des Plaines River Bridge	Extant	Vertical-lift bridge	1932	1988	Chicago, Rock Island and Pacific Railroad	Des Plaines River	Joliet	Will	41°31′15″N 88°05′16″W
IL-64	Chicago River Bascule Bridge, Clarke Street [sic]	Extant	Simple trunnion bascule	1929	1987	Clark Street	Chicago River	Chicago	Cook	41°53′15″N 87°37′52″W
IL-65	Chicago River Bascule Bridge, Franklin Street	Extant	Simple trunnion bascule	1920	1987	Franklin Street	Chicago River	Chicago	Cook	41°53′14″N 87°38′09″W
IL-66	Chicago River Bascule Bridge, LaSalle Street	Extant	Simple trunnion bascule	1928	1987	LaSalle Street	Chicago River	Chicago	Cook	41°53′15″N 87°37′57″W
IL-67	Baltimore and Ohio Railroad, Chicago Terminal Railroad, South Branch of the Chicago River Bridge	Extant	Strauss bascule	1930	1988	CSX Transportation (disused)	South Branch of Chicago River	Chicago	Cook	41°51′40″N 87°38′04″W
IL-71	Chicago, Burlington and Quincy Railroad, Illinois River Bridge	Extant	Vertical-lift bridge	1898	1988	Illinois Railway	Illinois River	Ottawa	LaSalle	41°20′30″N 88°50′49″W
IL-79	Chicago and Western Indiana Railroad Bridge	Extant	Swing span	1900	1988	Belt Railway of Chicago	Sanitary and Ship Canal	Chicago	Cook	41°49′16″N 87°44′19″W
IL-81	Rock Island Railroad, I&M Canal Bridge	Extant	Warren truss	1905	1986	Illinois and Michigan Canal Trail	Illinois and Michigan Canal	Morris	Grundy	41°21′21″N 88°25′37″W
IL-82	Illinois Traction System, Fox River Bridge	Extant	Steel built-up girder	1903	1986	Illinois and Michigan Canal Trail	Fox River	Ottawa	LaSalle	41°21′08″N 88°49′42″W
IL-97	Marseilles Nabisco Bridge	Extant	Howe truss	1888	1988	Former Chicago, Rock Island and Pacific Railroad spur	Marseilles Hydro Plant canal	Marseilles	LaSalle	41°19′37″N 88°42′41″W
IL-99	Pennsylvania Railroad, "Eight-track" Bascule Bridge	Extant	Rolling lift (Scherzer) bascule	1910	1988	CSX Transportation and Norfolk Southern Railway	Sanitary and Ship Canal	Chicago	Cook	41°50′13″N 87°41′15″W
IL-103	Chicago, Rock Island and Pacific Railroad, Illinois and Michigan Canal Bridge	Extant	Swing span	1911	1992	Caterpillar Inc. industrial track	Illinois and Michigan Canal	Rockdale	Will	41°50′23″N 87°39′53″W
IL-104	Chicago and Alton Railroad Bridge	Extant	Page bascule	1906	1992	Illinois Central Railroad	South Branch of Chicago River	Chicago	Cook	41°29′42″N 88°08′22″W
IL-107	Hazen Bridge (Newcomb Bridge)	Extant	Pratt truss	1893	1993	Former Township Road 85	Sangamon River	Mahomet	Champaign	40°15′10″N 88°23′00″W
IL-108	Tiskilwa Bridge	Replaced	Pratt truss	1884	1993	CR 1890 E (Township Road 236)	Big Bureau Creek	Tiskilwa	Bureau	41°17′37″N 89°29′36″W
IL-109	Campbell Bridge	Relocated	Pratt truss	1895	1993	Campbell Road (Township Road 22)	Cedar Creek	Little York	Warren	41°00′54″N 90°45′30″W
IL-111	Chicago River Bascule Bridges	Extant	Simple trunnion bascule	1900–1940	1993	Various streets	Chicago River and branches	Chicago	Cook	
IL-112	Pennsylvania Railroad, South Branch Chicago River Bridge	Extant	Vertical-lift bridge	1914	1992	Amtrak	South Branch of Chicago River	Chicago	Cook	41°51′20″N 87°38′13″W
IL-113	Chicago, Madison and Northern Railroad, Sanitary and Ship Canal Bridge	Extant	Swing span	1899	1992	Illinois Central Railroad	Sanitary and Ship Canal	Chicago	Cook	41°49′57″N 87°42′09″W
IL-118	Hill Creek Bridge	Relocated	Warren truss	1934	1993	IL 100	Hill Creek	Pearl	Pike	39°27′29″N 90°37′31″W
IL-119	White's Ferry Bridge	Replaced	Parker truss	1910	1994	East Buckeye Church Road	Spoon River	Blyton	Fulton	40°31′55″N 90°18′39″W
IL-120	North Inlet Bridge	Reconstructed	Steel built-up girder	1895	1993	US 41 (South Lake Shore Drive)	Jackson Park Lagoon	Chicago	Cook	41°47′18″N 87°34′40″W
IL-121	Calumet-Sag Channel Bridges	Extant	Pratt truss	1935	1988	IHB, BOCT, and GTW railroads	Calumet-Sag Channel	Blue Island	Cook	41°39′08″N 87°41′14″W
IL-122	Fidler Bridge	Replaced	Pennsylvania truss	1896	1995	CR 1700 E (County Highway 45)	Iroquois River	Watseka	Iroquois	40°48′44″N 87°48′25″W
IL-123	Renwick Road Bridge	Replaced	Pratt truss	1912	1995	West Renwick Road (County Highway 36)	DuPage River	Plainfield	Will	41°35′33″N 88°13′28″W
IL-124	Butzow Bridge	Replaced	Pratt truss	1883	1995	CR 2100 N (County Highway 35)	Spring Creek	Crescent City	Iroquois	40°48′48″N 87°49′44″W
IL-125	Coal Creek Bridge	Replaced	Warren truss	1936	1995	IL 97	Coal Creek	Fairview	Fulton	40°40′22″N 90°09′52″W
IL-126	Deer Creek Bridge	Replaced	Warren truss	1910	1994	CR 1700 E (Township Road 406)	Deer Creek	Geff	Wayne	38°28′43″N 88°23′05″W
IL-128	Main Street Bridge	Replaced	Reinforced concrete T-beam	1918	1994	IL 72 (Main Street)	Fox River	West Dundee and East Dundee	Kane	42°05′53″N 88°16′34″W
IL-129	North Kinney Road Bridge	Replaced	Steel rolled multi-beam	1910	1995	North Kinney Road	Brown Creek	Rock City	Stephenson	42°21′27″N 89°27′23″W
IL-130	Zurich Road Bridge	Replaced	Queen post truss	1890	1996	West Zurich Road	Former Chicago and Alton Railroad	Joliet	Will	41°29′28″N 88°05′15″W
IL-132	Wallrich Bridge	Replaced	Bowstring arch truss	1905	1996	CR 3400 E	North Fork of Vermilion River	Cullom	Livingston	40°50′16″N 88°16′48″W
IL-134	Chicago River Bascule Bridge, Kinzie Street	Extant	Simple trunnion bascule	1909	1987	West Kinzie Street	North Branch of Chicago River	Chicago	Cook	41°53′21″N 87°38′21″W
IL-135	Chicago River Bascule Bridge, State Street	Extant	Simple trunnion bascule	1942	1987	North State Street	Chicago River	Chicago	Cook	41°53′15″N 87°37′41″W
IL-136	Chicago River Bascule Bridge, Columbus Avenue	Extant	Simple trunnion bascule	1970	1987	Columbus Drive	Chicago River	Chicago	Cook	41°53′19″N 87°37′14″W
IL-137	Chicago River Bascule Bridge, Canal Street	Extant	Simple trunnion bascule	1930	1987	Canal Street	South Branch of Chicago River	Chicago	Cook	41°51′17″N 87°38′19″W
IL-138	Chicago River Bascule Bridge, West Cortland Street	Extant	Simple trunnion bascule	1901	1987	West Cortland Street	North Branch of Chicago River	Chicago	Cook	41°55′01″N 87°39′51″W
IL-139	Chicago River Bascule Bridge, Grand Avenue	Extant	Simple trunnion bascule	1913	1987	West Grand Avenue	North Branch of Chicago River	Chicago	Cook	41°53′29″N 87°38′28″W
IL-140	Fullersburg Bridge	Replaced	Reinforced concrete T-beam	1924	1995	York Road	Salt Creek	Oak Brook	DuPage	41°49′15″N 87°55′37″W
IL-141	Braceville Bridge	Demolished	Steel arch	1939	1999	Former IL 129 (Old US 66)	Former Chicago and Alton Railroad	Braceville	Grundy	41°12′36″N 88°16′51″W
IL-142	Chicago and North Western Railway, Kinzie Street Bridge	Extant	Strauss bascule	1908	2001	Former Chicago and North Western Railway	North Branch of Chicago River	Chicago	Cook	41°53′19″N 87°38′21″W
IL-143	Chicago, Milwaukee and St. Paul Railway, Bridge No. Z-2	Extant	Swing span	1902	2001	Chicago Terminal Railroad	North Branch Canal of Chicago River	Chicago	Cook	41°54′37″N 87°39′20″W
IL-144	Chicago Avenue Bridge	Extant	Simple trunnion bascule	1914	1999	Chicago Avenue	North Branch of Chicago River	Chicago	Cook	41°53′47″N 87°38′39″W
IL-145	Chicago Skyway Toll Bridge	Extant	Cantilever	1958	2001	Chicago Skyway	Calumet River	Chicago	Cook	41°43′03″N 87°32′33″W
IL-146	South Bridge (Coast Guard Drive Bridge)	Extant	Reinforced concrete closed-spandrel arch	1904	1999	US 41 (South Lake Shore Drive)	Jackson Park Lagoon	Chicago	Cook	41°46′33″N 87°34′31″W
IL-147	Division Street Canal Bridge	Extant	Simple trunnion bascule	1903	1999	West Division Street	North Branch Canal of Chicago River	Chicago	Cook	41°54′13″N 87°38′58″W
IL-148	Division Street River Bridge	Extant	Simple trunnion bascule	1907	1999	West Division Street	North Branch of Chicago River	Chicago	Cook	41°54′13″N 87°39′27″W
IL-149	Elgin, Joliet and Eastern Railway, Calumet River Bridge	Extant	Vertical-lift bridge		1999	Elgin, Joliet and Eastern Railway	Calumet River	Chicago	Cook	41°43′43″N 87°32′22″W
IL-150	106th Street Bridge	Extant	Simple trunnion bascule		1999	106th Street	Calumet River	Chicago	Cook	41°42′10″N 87°32′45″W
IL-152	Monroe Street Viaduct	Extant	Viaduct	1939	1999	East Monroe Street	Metra tracks	Chicago	Cook	41°52′51″N 87°37′23″W
IL-153	Middle Bridge (Hayes Drive Bridge)	Extant	Reinforced concrete closed-spandrel arch		1999	East Hayes Drive	Jackson Park Lagoon	Chicago	Cook	41°46′48″N 87°34′43″W
IL-154	North Avenue Bridge	Replaced	Simple trunnion bascule	1907	1999	IL 64 (West North Avenue)	North Branch of Chicago River	Chicago	Cook	41°54′39″N 87°39′25″W
IL-155	Passerelle in Lincoln Park	Extant	Steel arch	1940	2001	Pedestrian way on line of East Menomonee Street	US 41 (North Lake Shore Drive)	Chicago	Cook	41°54′55″N 87°37′39″W
IL-156	Pittsburgh, Fort Wayne and Chicago Railway, Calumet River Bridge	Extant	Vertical-lift bridge	1913	2001	Norfolk Southern Railway	Calumet River	Chicago	Cook	41°43′10″N 87°32′34″W
IL-157	St. Charles Air Line Bridge	Extant	Strauss bascule	1919	2001	St. Charles Air Line	South Branch of Chicago River	Chicago	Cook	41°51′39″N 87°38′04″W
IL-158	Thirty-First Street Viaduct	Extant	Viaduct	1927	1999	East 31st Street	Northeast Illinois Railroad Corporation	Chicago	Cook	41°50′19″N 87°36′39″W
IL-160	North Halsted Street Bridge	Replaced	Simple trunnion bascule	1908	1999	North Halsted Street	North Branch Canal of Chicago River	Chicago	Cook	41°54′07″N 87°38′53″W
IL-161	Lake Shore and Michigan Southern Railway, Bridge No. 6	Abandoned	Vertical-lift bridge	1915	2001	Norfolk Southern Railway	Calumet River	Chicago	Cook	41°43′11″N 87°32′34″W
IL-162	Chicago, Milwaukee and St. Paul Railway, Bridge No. Z-6	Extant	Swing span	1899	2001	Chicago Terminal Railroad	North Branch of Chicago River	Chicago	Cook	41°54′56″N 87°39′49″W
IN-59	Hutsonville Bridge	Replaced	Suspension	1939	1988	SR 154	Wabash River	Hutsonville, Illinois, and Graysville, Indiana	Crawford County, Illinois, and Sullivan County, Indiana	39°06′36″N 87°39′18″W
MO-12	Eads Bridge	Extant	Steel arch	1874	1983	Washington Avenue	Mississippi River	East St. Louis, Illinois, and St. Louis, Missouri	St. Clair County, Illinois, and Independent city	38°37′44″N 90°10′44″W
MO-77	Mark Twain Memorial Bridge	Demolished	Cantilever	1936	1994	US 36	Mississippi River	East Hannibal, Illinois, and Hannibal, Missouri	Pike County, Illinois, and Marion County, Missouri	39°42′58″N 91°21′10″W
MO-84	Cape Girardeau Bridge	Replaced	Cantilever	1928	1994	IL 146 / Route 34	Mississippi River	East Cape Girardeau, Illinois, and Cape Girardeau, Missouri	Alexander County, Illinois, and Cape Girardeau County, Missouri	37°17′43″N 89°30′57″W
