= Goose Island (Chicago) =

Artificial island in Chicago, Illinois, US

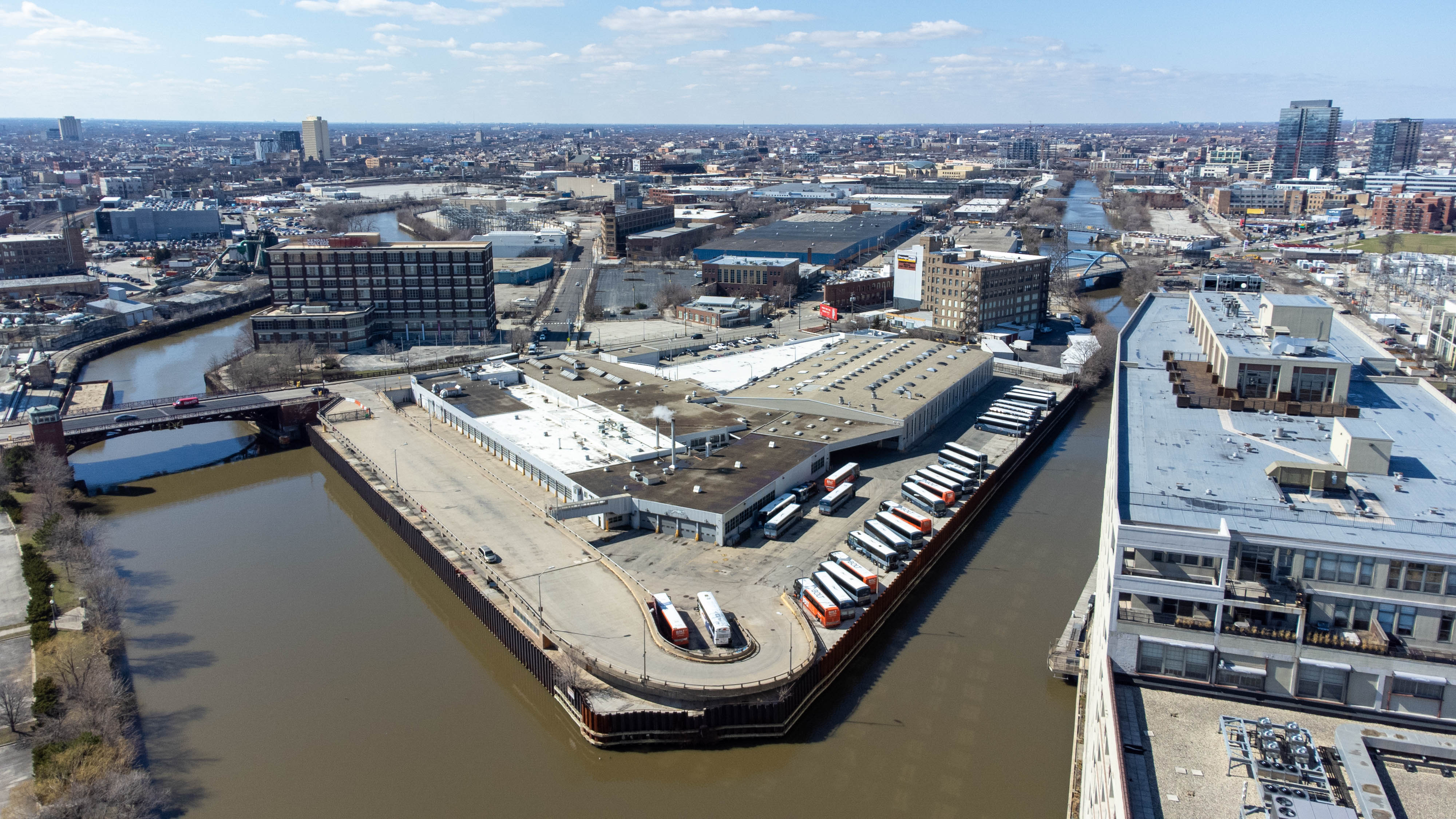
- Goose Island from the south
- Interactive map of Goose Island

Geography
- Location: Chicago River
- Coordinates: 41°54′16″N 87°39′15″W
- Area: 160 acres (65 ha)
- Length: 1.5 mi (2.4 km)
- Width: 0.5 mi (0.8 km)

Administration
- United States
- State: Illinois
- City: Chicago

Goose Island is a 160-acre (65 ha) artificial island in Chicago, Illinois, formed by the North Branch of the Chicago River on the west and the North Branch Canal on the east. It is about 1.5 miles (2.4 km) long and 0.5 miles (0.80 km) across at its widest point.

== Early history ==
The name may have originally referred to a small natural island at the north side of the confluence of the North and South Branches of the Chicago River that was home to seasonal flocks of birds. In the late 1840s, the surrounding area was on the fringes of Chicago and a group of Irish immigrants started squatting on the unoccupied land around what is now Kinzie Street, between Orleans Street and the river. This settlement may have been known as Kilgubbin, after an area of County Cork that had been home to many of the immigrants. The squatters eventually moved a short distance north to an area on the east side of the river between Chicago Avenue and Division Street, site of the present-day Goose Island. The natural island had been dredged away by 1865.

The land that was to become the present-day Goose Island lies on a bend in the Chicago River between North Avenue on the north and Chicago Avenue on the south. In 1853, William B. Ogden, who had earlier served as Chicago's first mayor, formed the Chicago Land Company, which purchased land on the east side of the river to excavate clay for brick-making. Starting from the south, workers excavated a channel northwards, and by 1857 the channel had rejoined the river, forming a shortcut past the bend in the river. The channel was eventually dredged to 50 feet (15 m) wide and 10 feet (3 m) deep to make it navigable, and it became known as the North Branch Canal, or Ogden's Canal. The island thus created was also sometimes nicknamed Ogden's Island, a name that some Chicago aldermen proposed to make the official name of the island in 1891. The name Goose Island may refer to the earlier location of the Kilgubbin settlement, or it may have been in reference to the flocks of geese kept by the settlers on the island.

The settlers were eventually joined by Polish and German immigrants to the city. For most of the residents, daily life hovered between rural and urban, with many raising livestock while also working in nearby factories. Over 100 units of housing were built in a three-block area to accommodate the new residents and taverns and bars opened.

== Industrialization ==
In the late 19th century, Peoples Gas, Light & Coke Co. purchased land on the east of the island for industrial plants. The area was nicknamed "Little Hell" because of the smoke produced by the plants. By 1887 there were two grain elevators, eleven coal yards, and a railroad. By the turn of the 20th century many residents began to move off the island and some businesses also deserted it.

== Access ==
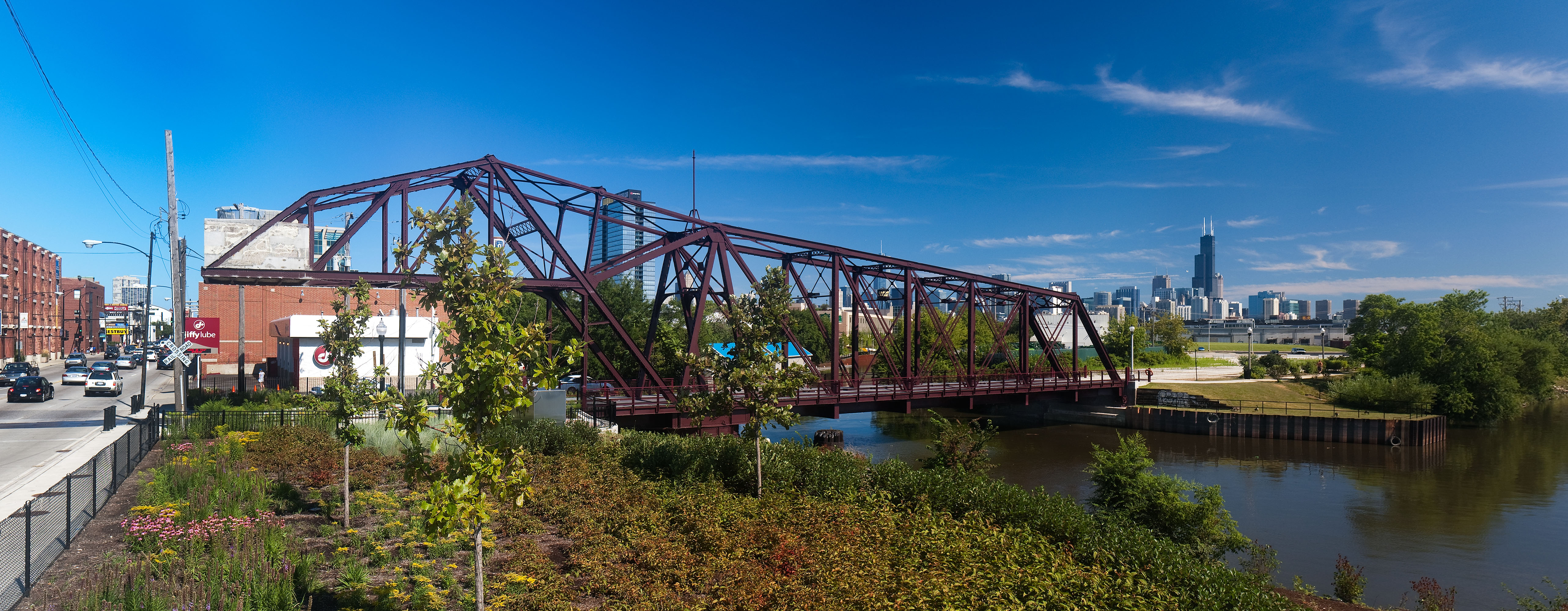
Cherry Avenue bridge across the canal

Goose Island is crossed by Division Street, running east–west, and Halsted Street, which runs north–south across the southeast portion of the island. In 1866 Halsted Street was connected to the island with the construction of a bridge across the river; a bridge across the canal at Halsted Street was added in 1874. The current bridges at these crossing points were constructed in 1955 and 2012 respectively. Division Street was first connected to the island with the construction of a bridge across the river in 1869; a second bridge across the canal was added in 1870. These bridges were replaced with Bascule bridges in 1904 and 1903 respectively. The East Division Street Bridge was the second ever Chicago-type Bascule bridge. In 2014 the east bridge was determined to have deteriorated such as to require complete replacement. It was removed and has been replaced with a temporary Bailey bridge.

The Cherry Avenue Bridge provides railroad access to the island at its northern tip. The Chicago and Pacific Railroad constructed railroad onto Goose Island in the 1870s. This company was absorbed into the Chicago, Milwaukee and St. Paul Railway in 1880. Operation of the surviving railroad on Goose Island was taken over by the Soo Line Railroad in 1986, and then by the Chicago Terminal Railroad in January 2007.

=== Former bridges ===
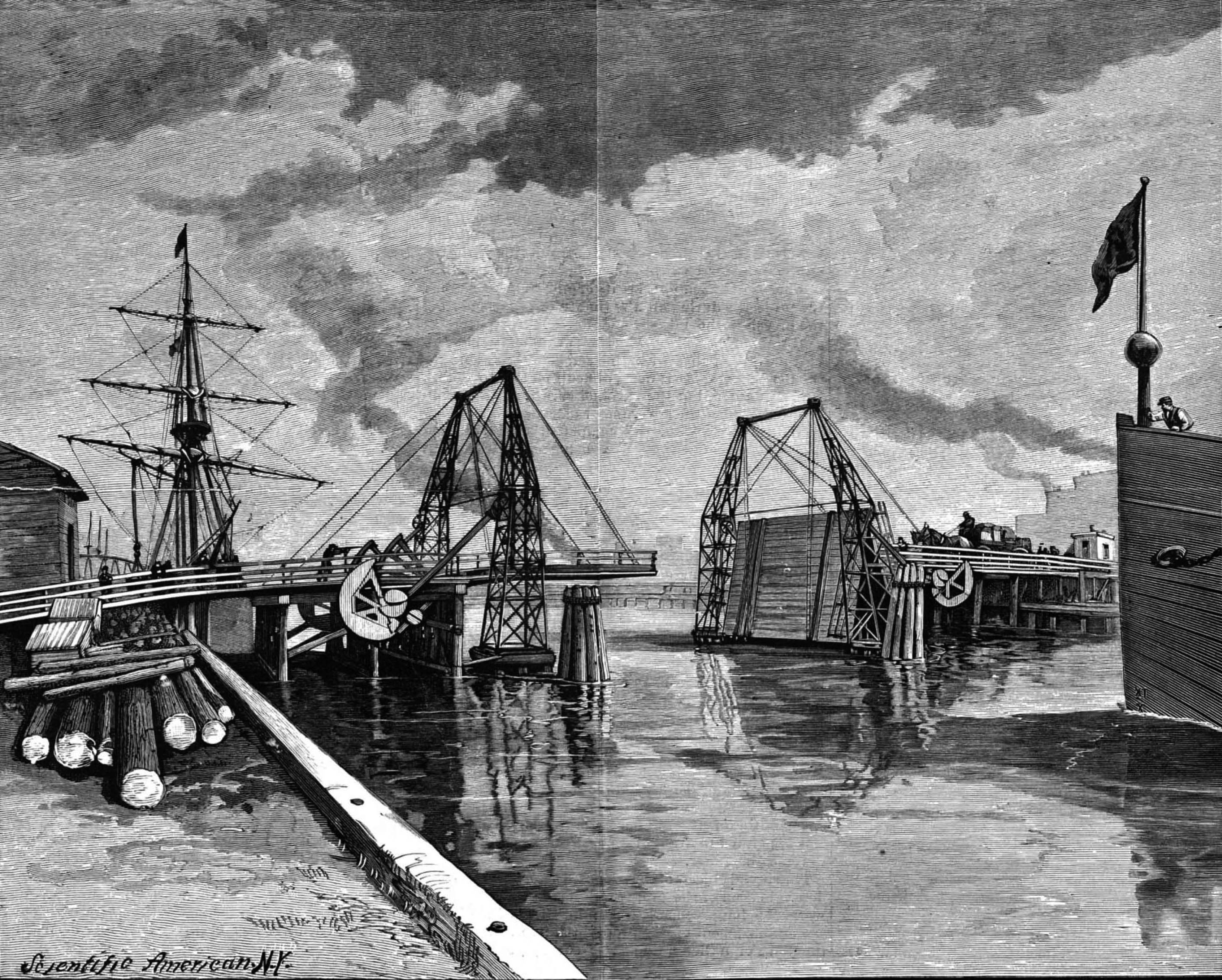
Illustration of Weed Street bridge from the cover of Scientific American on September 12, 1891

Two former access points to Goose Island have been removed. In 1891 an experimental bridge was constructed across the canal at Weed Street. This was the first attempt by the city of Chicago to find a bridge design suitable for replacing the city's swing bridges. The bridge was a wooden folding lift bridge constructed to a design by William Harman. The design, which became known as a jackknife bridge, proved too difficult to maintain and the bridge was closed to traffic in 1899. This bridge was removed in 1905 and replaced with a pontoon swing bridge until it too was removed in 1910. Another short-lived access was created when the original Division Street bridge across the river was moved to Blackhawk Street during replacement works in 1902, this bridge was also removed in 1910.

Ogden Avenue also crossed the island on a viaduct that opened in 1934, though it was not possible to access the island from the viaduct. In 1992 following the closure of the section of Ogden Avenue that ran to the north-east of the island the viaduct was demolished.

== Redevelopment ==
Goose Island has been a site of redevelopment of former industrial locations to residential and mixed-use towers and high rises, similar to the River North, Fulton Market and Pilsen neighborhoods of the city. Major land sites and warehouses have been developed or converted into modern manufacturing and creative loft-office space and towers on the island, including the Wrigley Corporation's research and development facility at the north end of the island and the former Sara Lee Corporation headquarters at the southern end of the island (since re-purposed as Kendall College). New Goose Island developments include 909 West Bliss Street, an adaptive re-use warehouse renovation and 934 North Branch Street, a 3.5-acre land site adjacent to the Chicago River. Names that have been used to market the redevelopment of Goose Island include Goose Island 2.0, Silicon Island, and Innovation Island. Amazon, Inc. has leased a warehouse on the island to serve as an urban ultra-local distribution hub for "Prime Now" one- and two-hour deliveries to residents around the city.
