= Cherry Avenue Bridge =

Bridge in Chicago, Illinois, U.S.

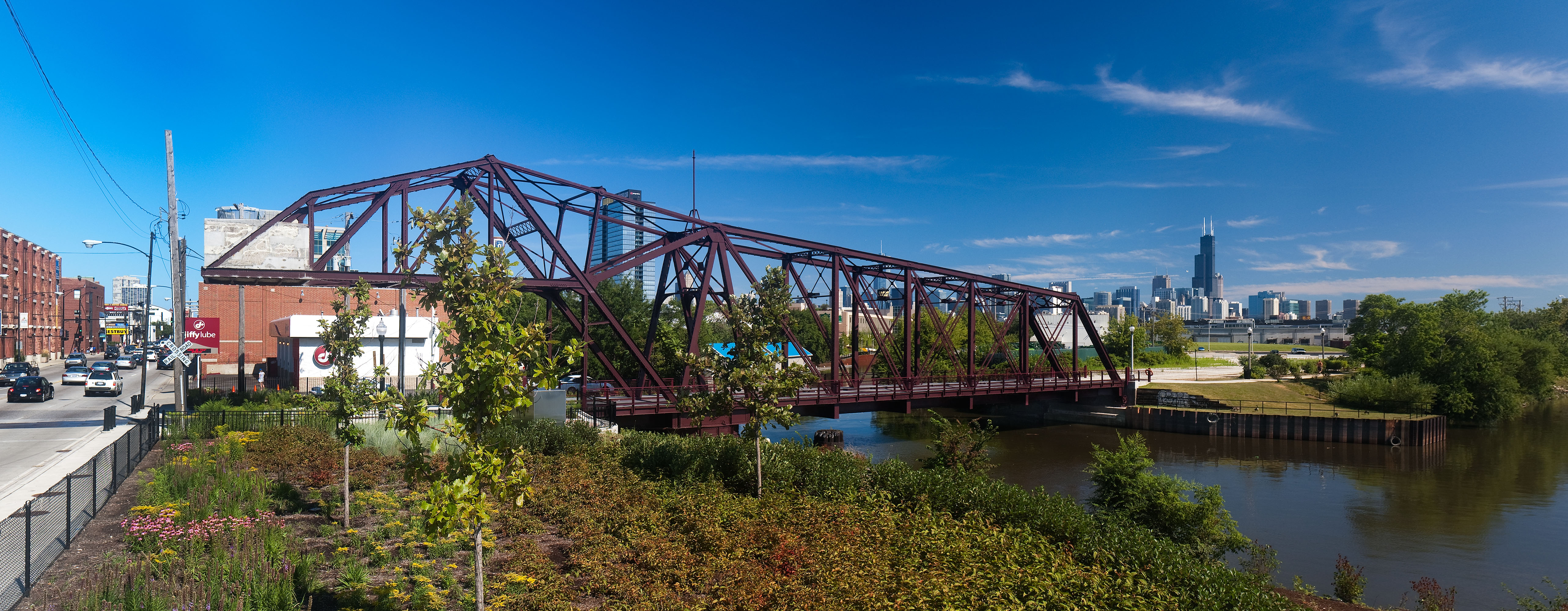
- Cherry Avenue bridge from North Avenue road bridge
- Coordinates: 41°54′37.1″N 87°39′19.9″W
- Crosses: North Branch Canal of the Chicago River
- Locale: Chicago
- Heritage status: Chicago Landmark

Characteristics
- Design: bob-tail swing bridge
- Total length: 230 feet (70 m)
- Longest span: 134.5 feet (41.0 m)

History
- Designer: Chicago, Milwaukee and St. Paul Railway
- Construction start: 1901
- Construction end: 1902

Location
- Interactive map of Cherry Avenue Bridge

The Cherry Avenue Bridge (North Avenue railroad bridge, or Chicago, Milwaukee & St. Paul Railway, Bridge No. Z-2) is an asymmetric bob-tail swing bridge in Chicago, Illinois, that carries the Chicago Terminal Railroad, pedestrians, and cyclists across the North Branch Canal of the Chicago River. Constructed in 1901–02 by the Chicago, Milwaukee and St. Paul Railway, it is a rare example of this type of bridge. It also played a key role in the development of Goose Island on Chicago's Near North Side. The bridge was designated a Chicago Landmark on December 12, 2007.

== Location ==
Cherry Avenue bridge is located at 41°54′37.1″N 87°39′19.9″W; it runs in a north-south orientation, spanning the North Branch Canal of the Chicago River to provide railroad access to Goose Island, an industrial area in the Near North Side community area of Chicago. The railroad track across the bridge is a spur line of the Chicago Terminal Railroad, that branches off from the route of the Union Pacific mainline about 0.5 miles (0.80 km) north-west of the bridge. The railroad continues for about 0.5 miles (0.80 km) south on Goose Island. North Avenue (Illinois Route 64) runs east-west at the north end of the bridge, crossing the North Avenue Bridge over the north branch of the Chicago River about 300 feet (91 m) to the west.

== History ==
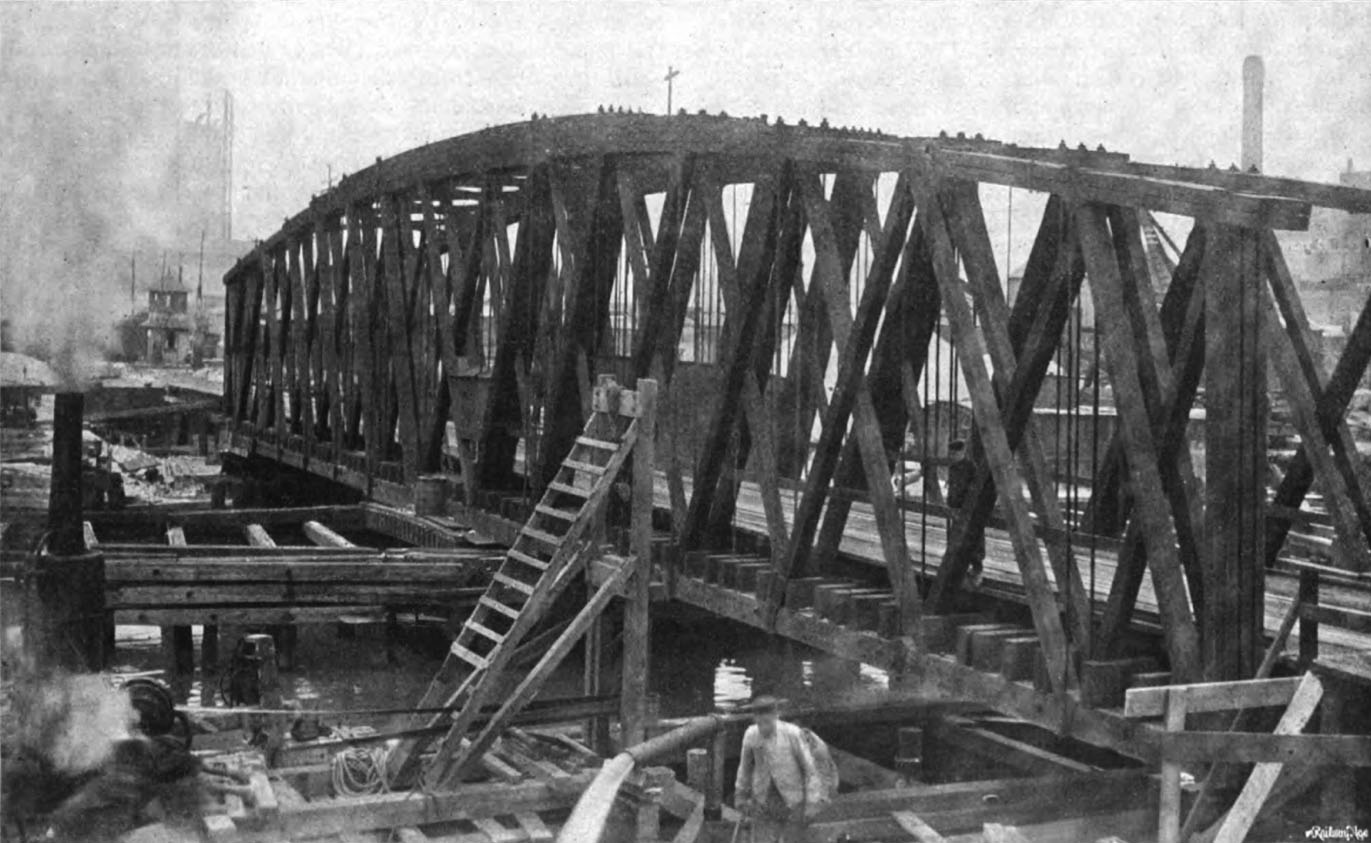
Previous bridge prior to demolition

Goose Island is a man-made island on the north branch of the Chicago River that was formed in the 1850s by the digging of the North Branch Canal. In 1871 the Chicago and Pacific Railroad started construction of a railroad from Goose Island through Elgin, Illinois to Byron, Illinois. This company was absorbed into the Chicago, Milwaukee and St. Paul Railway in 1880. The Cherry Avenue bridge was constructed in 1901–02 by the Chicago, Milwaukee and St. Paul to replace a 20-year-old bridge on the same location. It spans the North Branch Canal of the Chicago River providing the only railroad access to Goose Island.

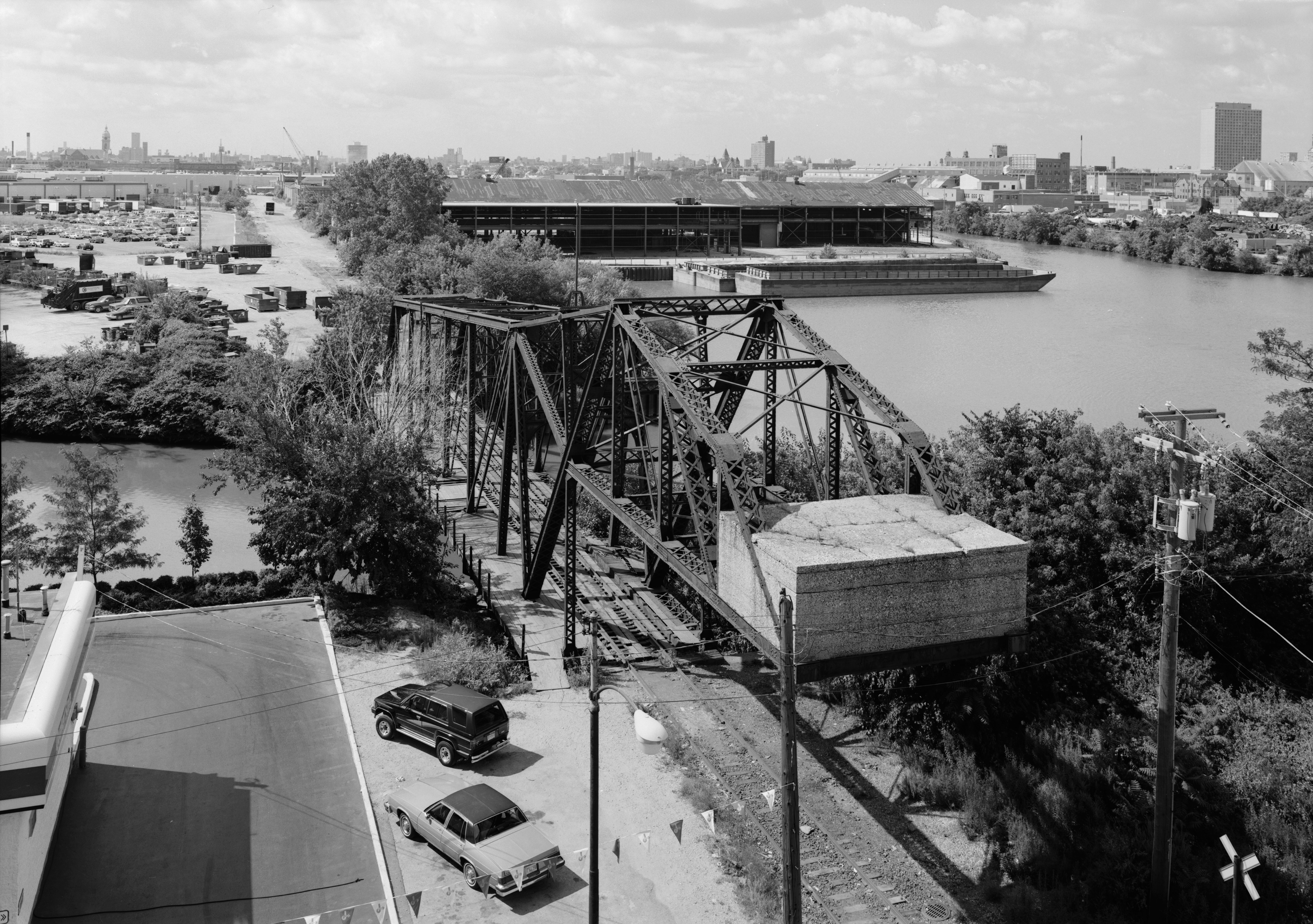
Cherry Avenue bridge as it appeared in 1999 before restoration

Railroad operation on Goose Island was taken over by the Soo Line Railroad in 1986, and then by the Chicago Terminal Railroad in January 2007. The bridge was purchased by the City of Chicago in 2008, and restored in 2008–09 adding new decking and lights to enable safe pedestrian access.

== Structure ==
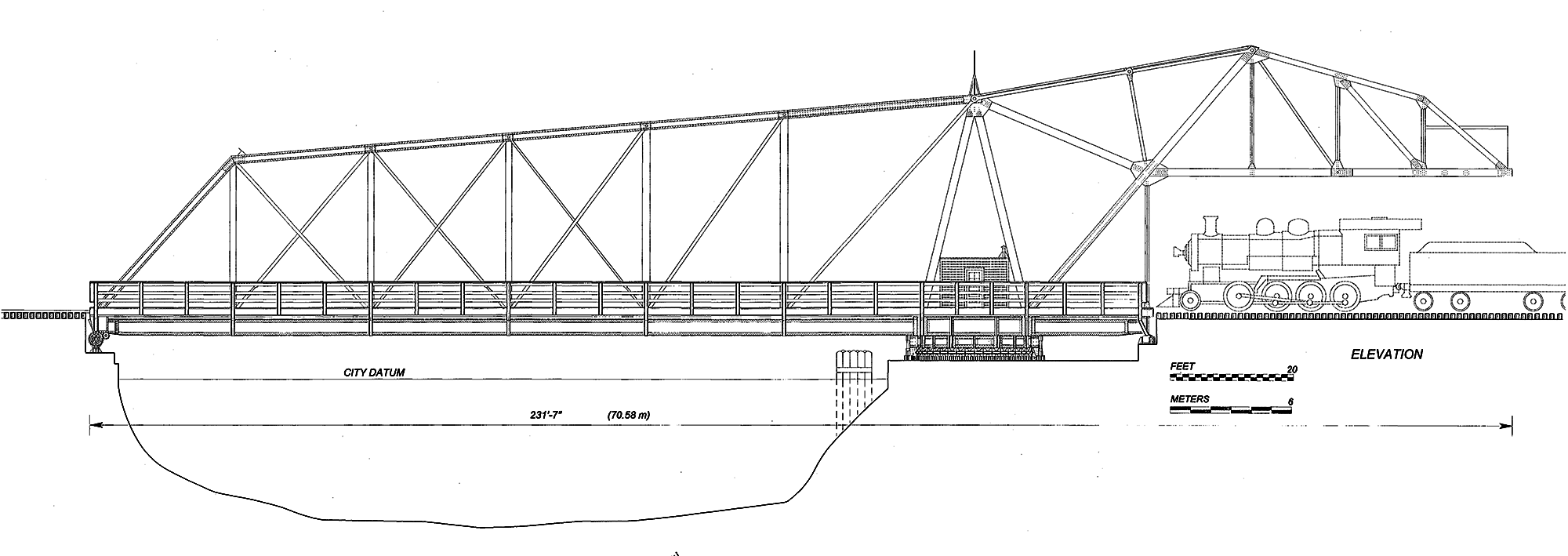
Eastern elevation of the bridge

The bridge is one of two bob-tail swing bridges constructed by the Chicago, Milwaukee & St. Paul Railway on the North Branch of the Chicago River. The bridge runs north-south, the pivot pier is on the shore on the north side of the channel with a 134.5-foot (41.0 m) long, 40-foot (12 m) high Pratt truss arm that spans the channel, and a 70-foot (21 m) arm that carries the 280,000-pound (130,000 kg) counter-weight 20 feet (6.1 m) above the tracks. The bridge is no longer operable, but when constructed it was able to swing to the east, to an angle of 82.5˚ when parallel to the dock wall. The bridge was designed to carry a single railroad track, but also may originally have been intended for use by other vehicular traffic on Cherry Avenue. A sidewalk is cantilevered from the east side of the bridge.

== See also ==
- List of bridges documented by the Historic American Engineering Record in Illinois
