= LaSalle Rail Bridge =

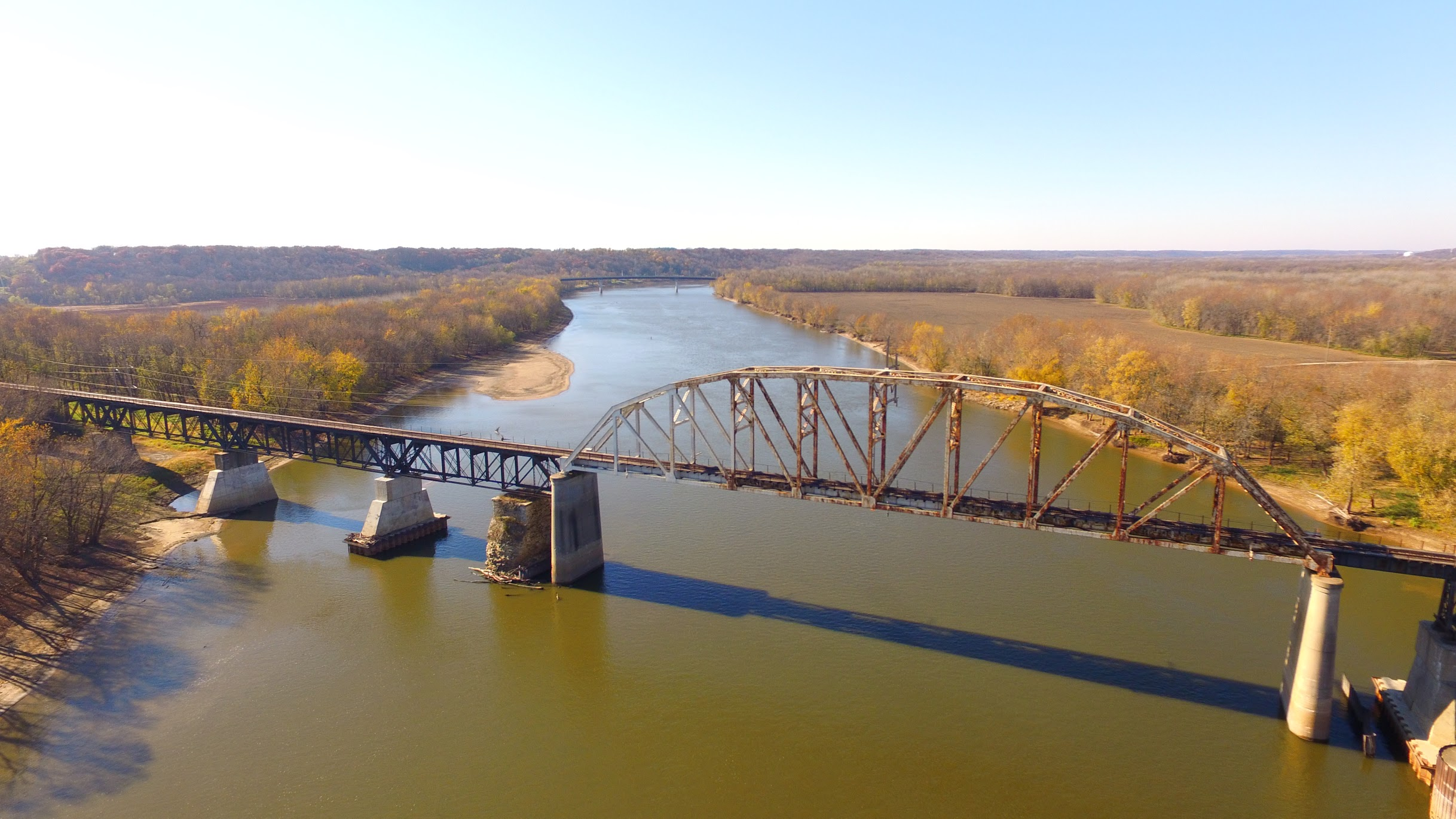
- LaSalle Rail Bridge in 2018.
- Coordinates: 41°19′21″N 89°04′58″W
- Carries: 1 track
- Crosses: Illinois River
- Locale: LaSalle and Oglesby, Illinois
- Official name: LaSalle Rail Bridge
- Maintained by: Illinois Department of Transportation
- ID number: 000050019120847

Characteristics
- Design: Steel deck truss
- Total length: Most estimates are about 2,875 feet (876 m)
- Height: 65 feet (20 m) above water, 505 feet (154 m) above sea level

History
- Construction end: 1893
- Opened: 1855

Location
- Interactive map of LaSalle Rail Bridge

The LaSalle Rail Bridge is a rail bridge that carries the former Illinois Central Railroad across the Illinois River in the small community of LaSalle, Illinois. The first bridge on this site was constructed in 1855, but the superstructure was entirely reconstructed in 1893.

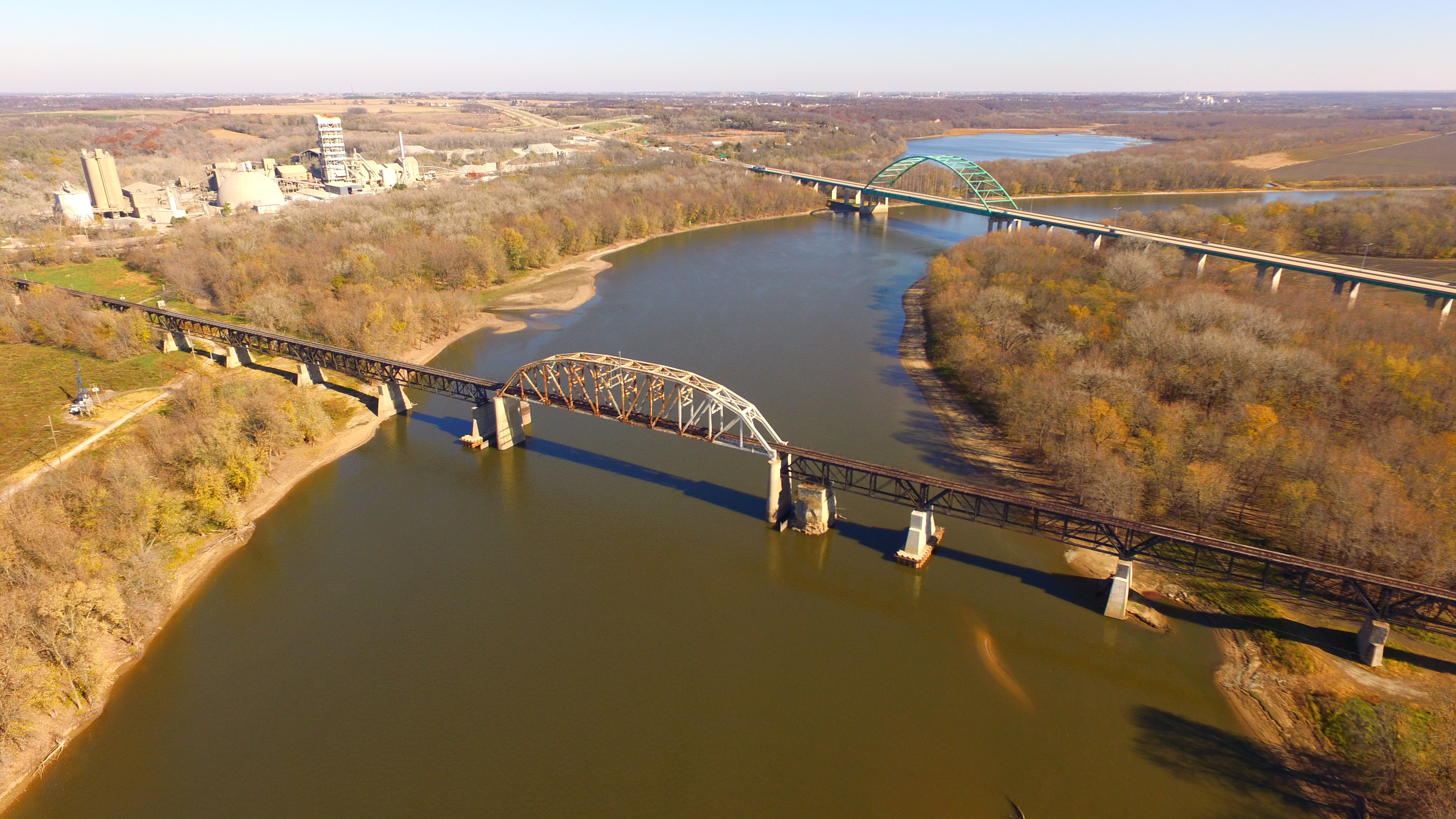
With the Abraham Lincoln Memorial Bridge

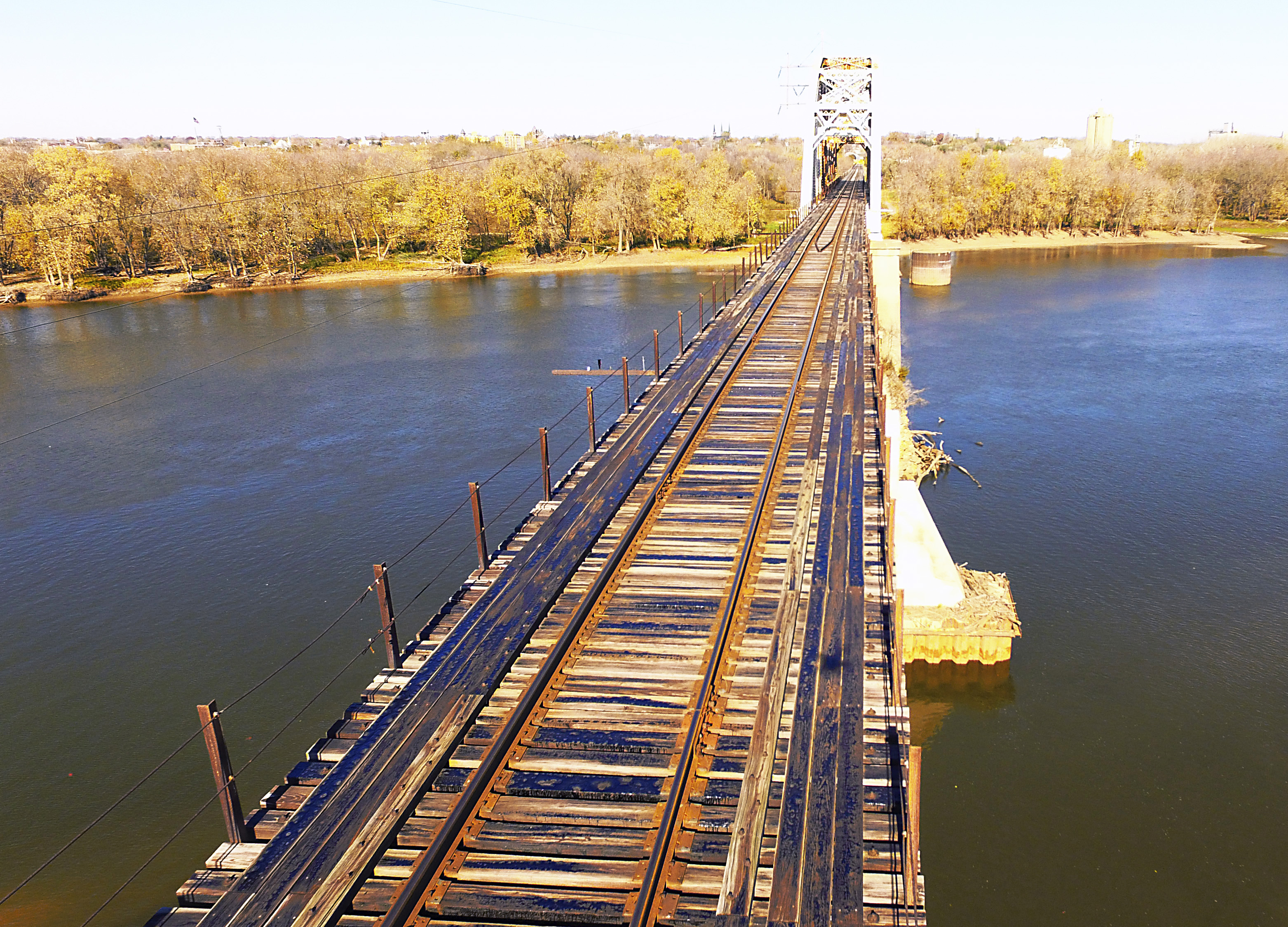

== See also ==
- List of bridges documented by the Historic American Engineering Record in Illinois
