= St. Charles Air Line Bridge =

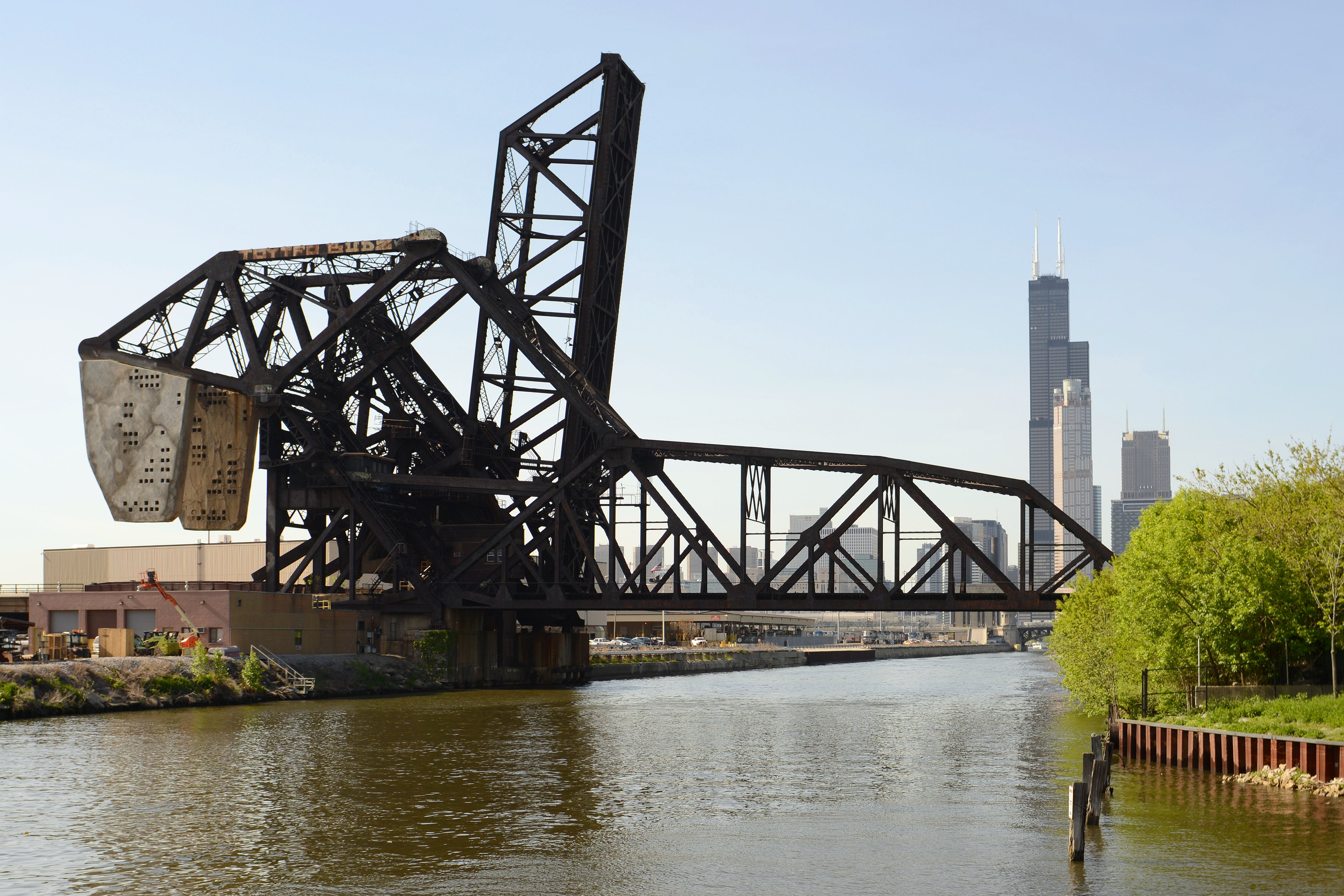
- St. Charles Air Line Bridge with the upright B&OCT Bascule Bridge just behind
- Coordinates: 41°51′39″N 87°38′04″W
- Carries: 2 tracks of the Canadian National Railway
- Crosses: Chicago River (south branch)
- Locale: Chicago, Illinois
- Official name: St. Charles Air Line Bridge
- Maintained by: Canadian National Railway

Characteristics
- Design: Strauss Trunnion bascule lift span
- Longest span: Originally 260 feet (79 m), later shortened to 220 feet (67 m) in 1930

History
- Designer: Joseph Strauss
- Opened: 1919

Location
- Interactive map of St. Charles Air Line Bridge

The St. Charles Air Line Bridge is a Strauss Trunnion bascule bridge which spans the Chicago River in Chicago, Illinois.

Built as part of the St. Charles Air Line Railroad by the American Bridge Company in 1919, the bridge originally had a span of 260 feet (79 m). This bridge held the world record for longest bascule-type span until 1930, when it was shortened to 220 feet (67 m) during a relocation as a result of straightening the river channel. The chief design engineer of the original bridge was Leonard O. Hopkins.

== History ==
The bridge's record-setting 260 feet (79 m) leaf was motivated primarily by federal clear-channel requirements, and the design included provisions for a one-time move to a straighter South Branch channel. It was designated a Chicago Landmark on December 12, 2007.

== Photo gallery ==
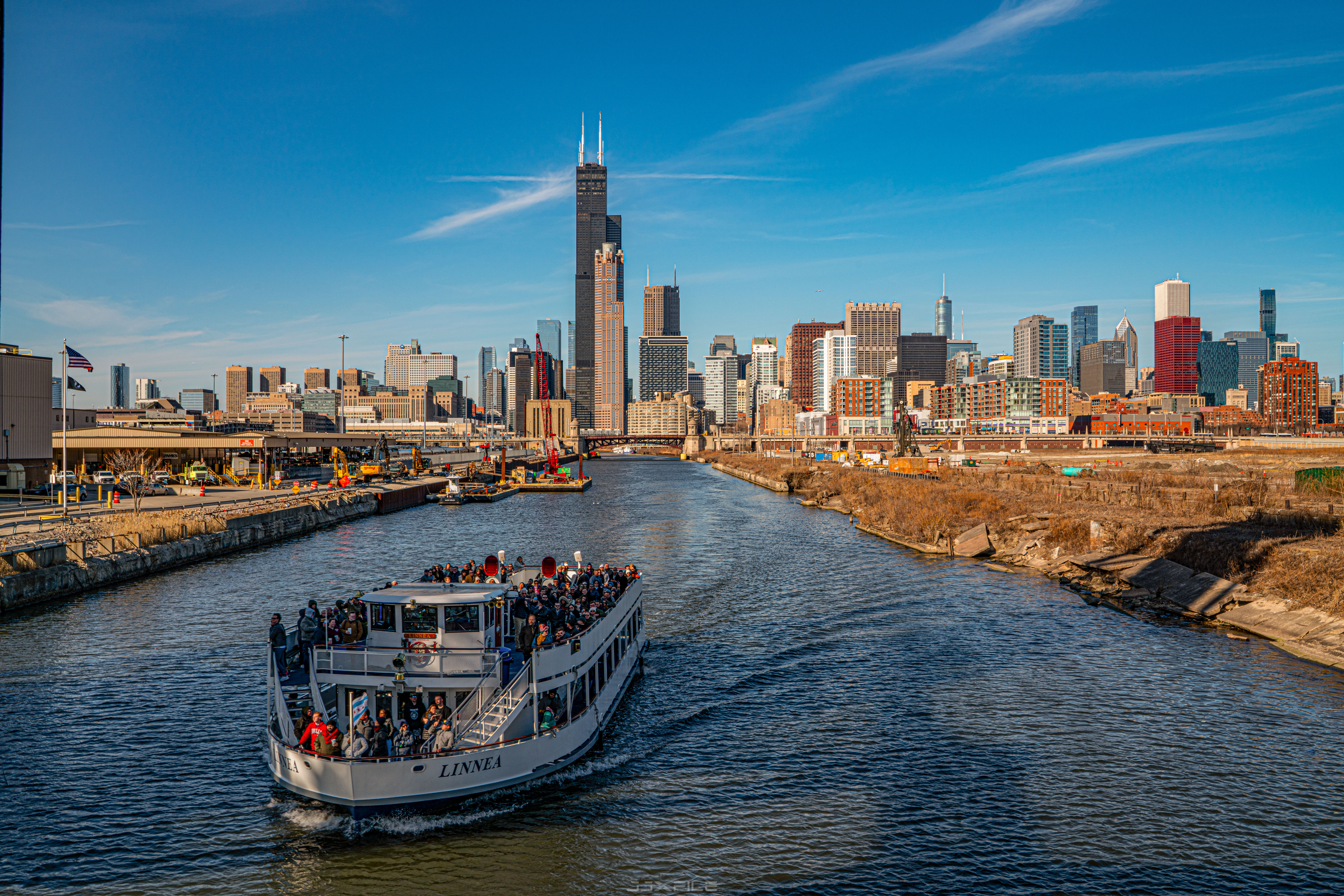
Chicago landscape with a boat

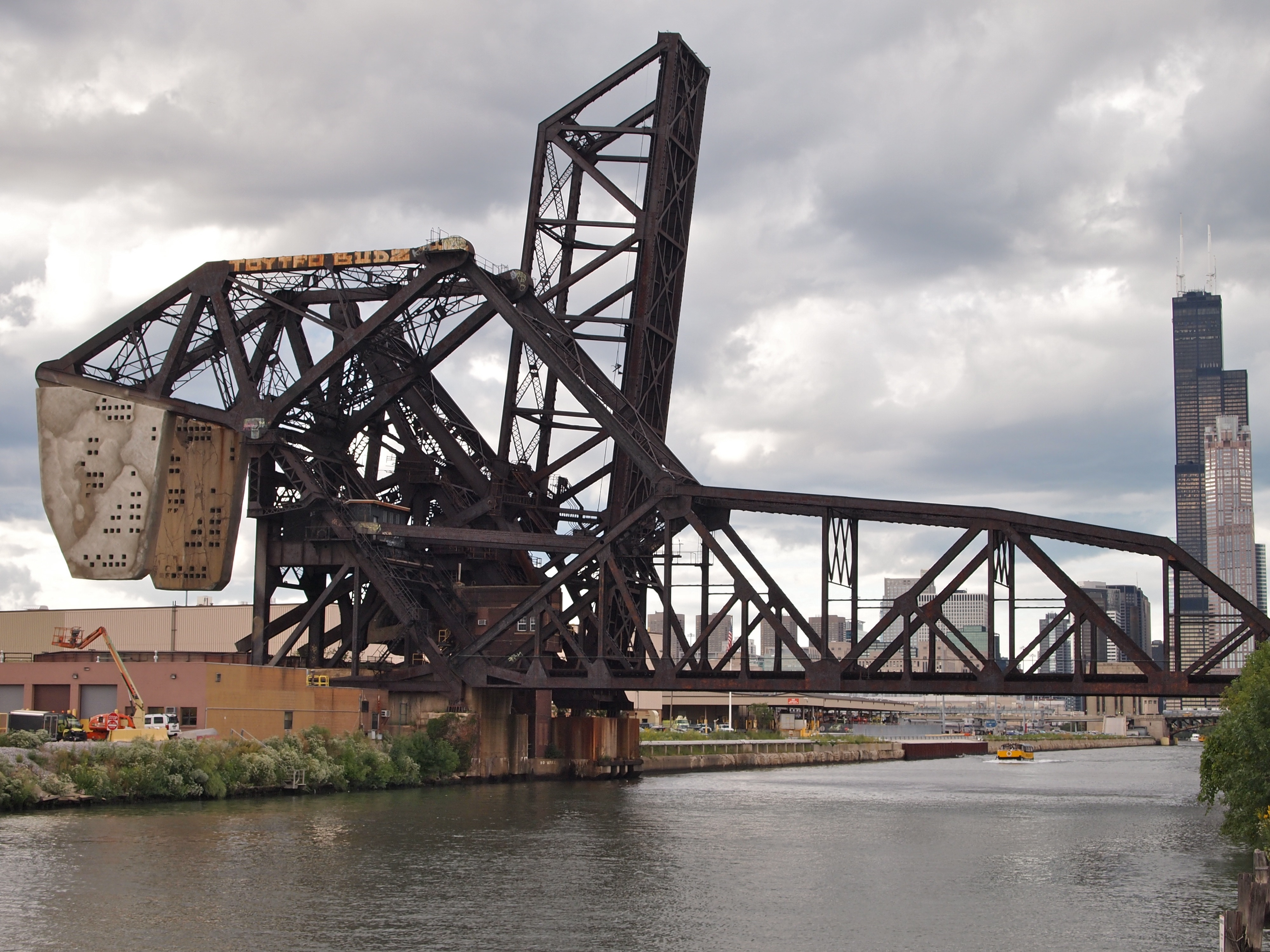

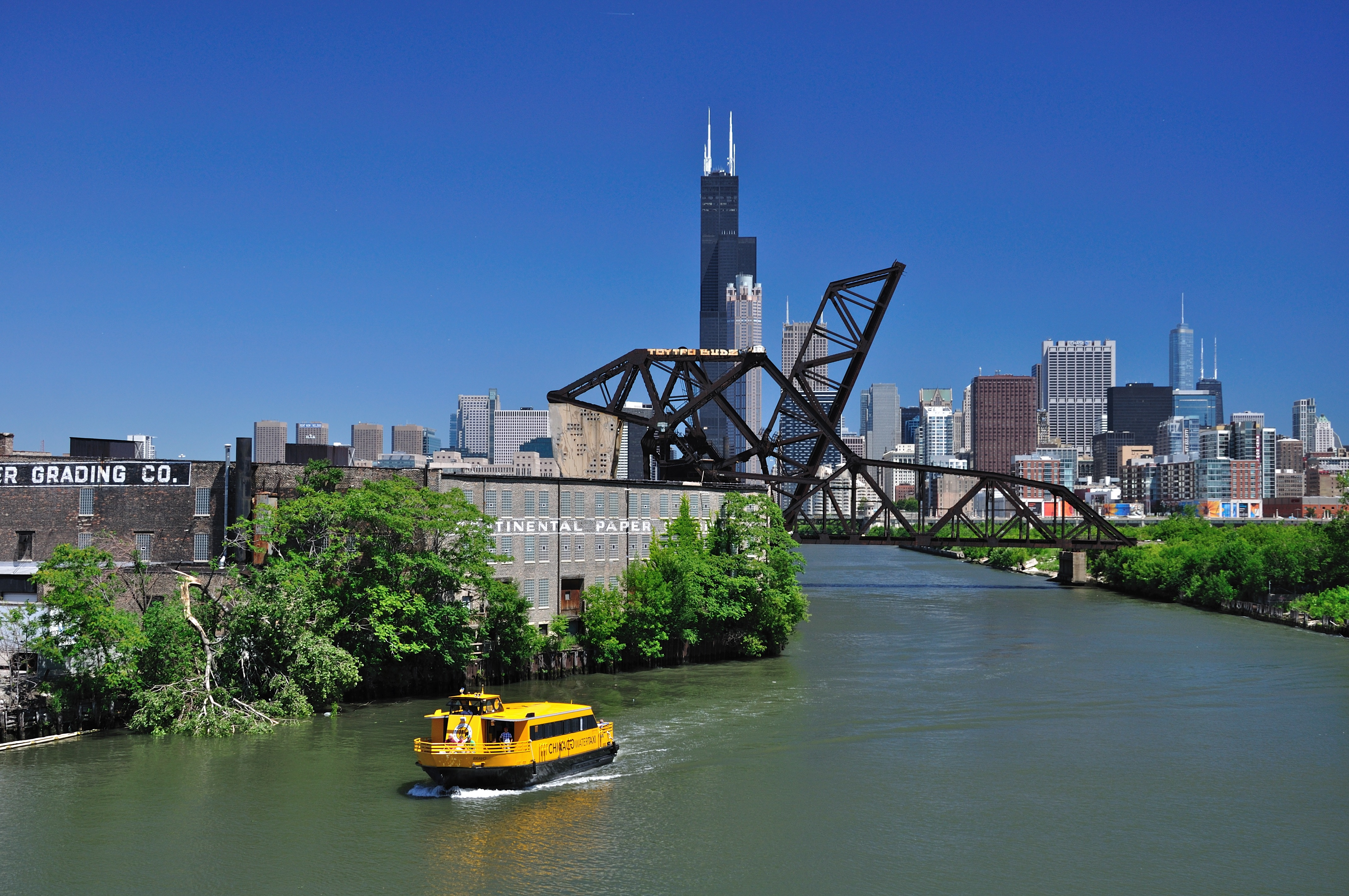

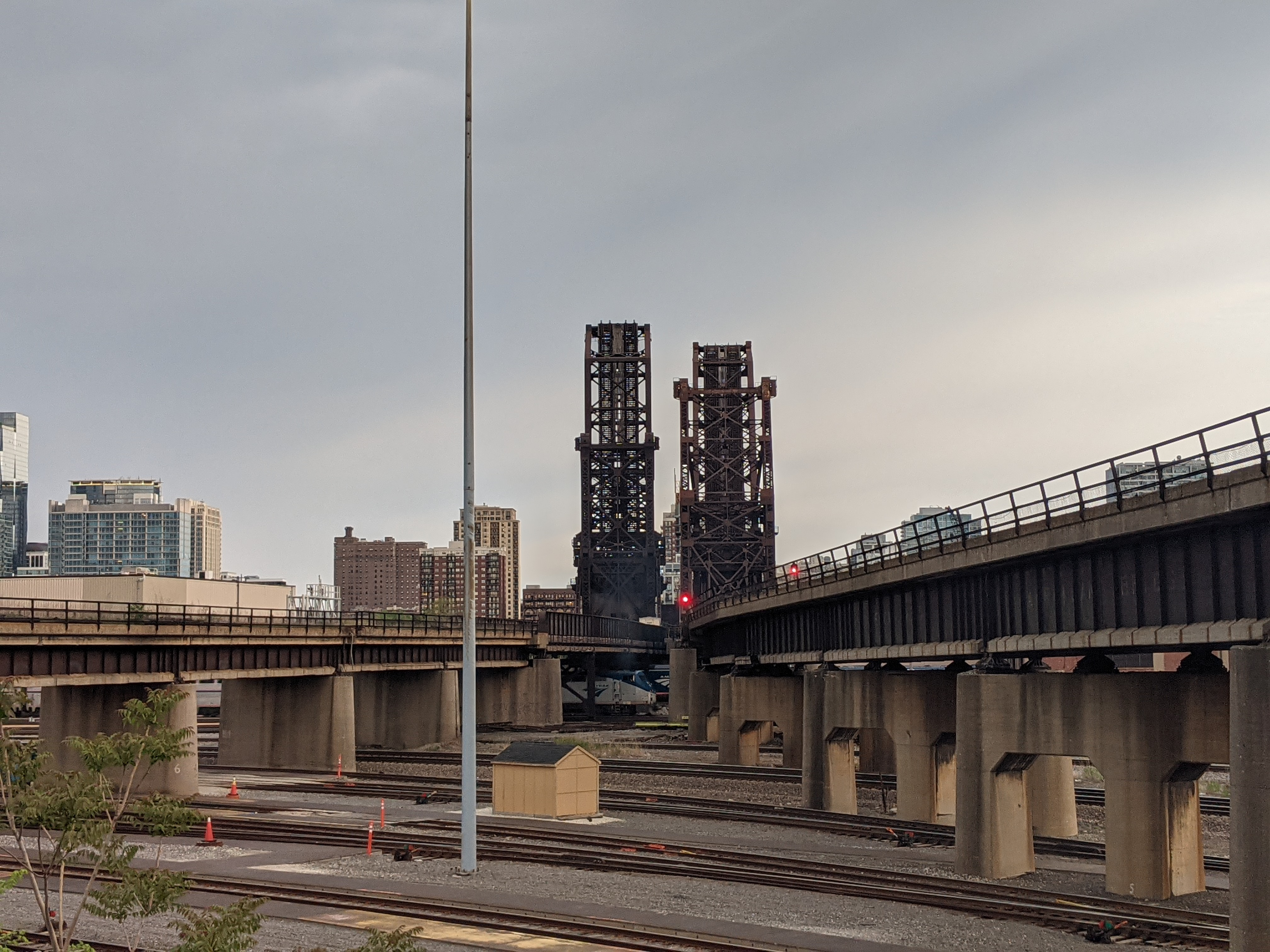
St. Charles Air Line Bridge, May 17, 2022.

St. Charles Air Line Bridge at night

== See also ==
- The adjacent B&OCT Bascule Bridge, with more information about the history of both bridges
- List of bridges documented by the Historic American Engineering Record in Illinois
