= Cortland Street Drawbridge =

American bridge

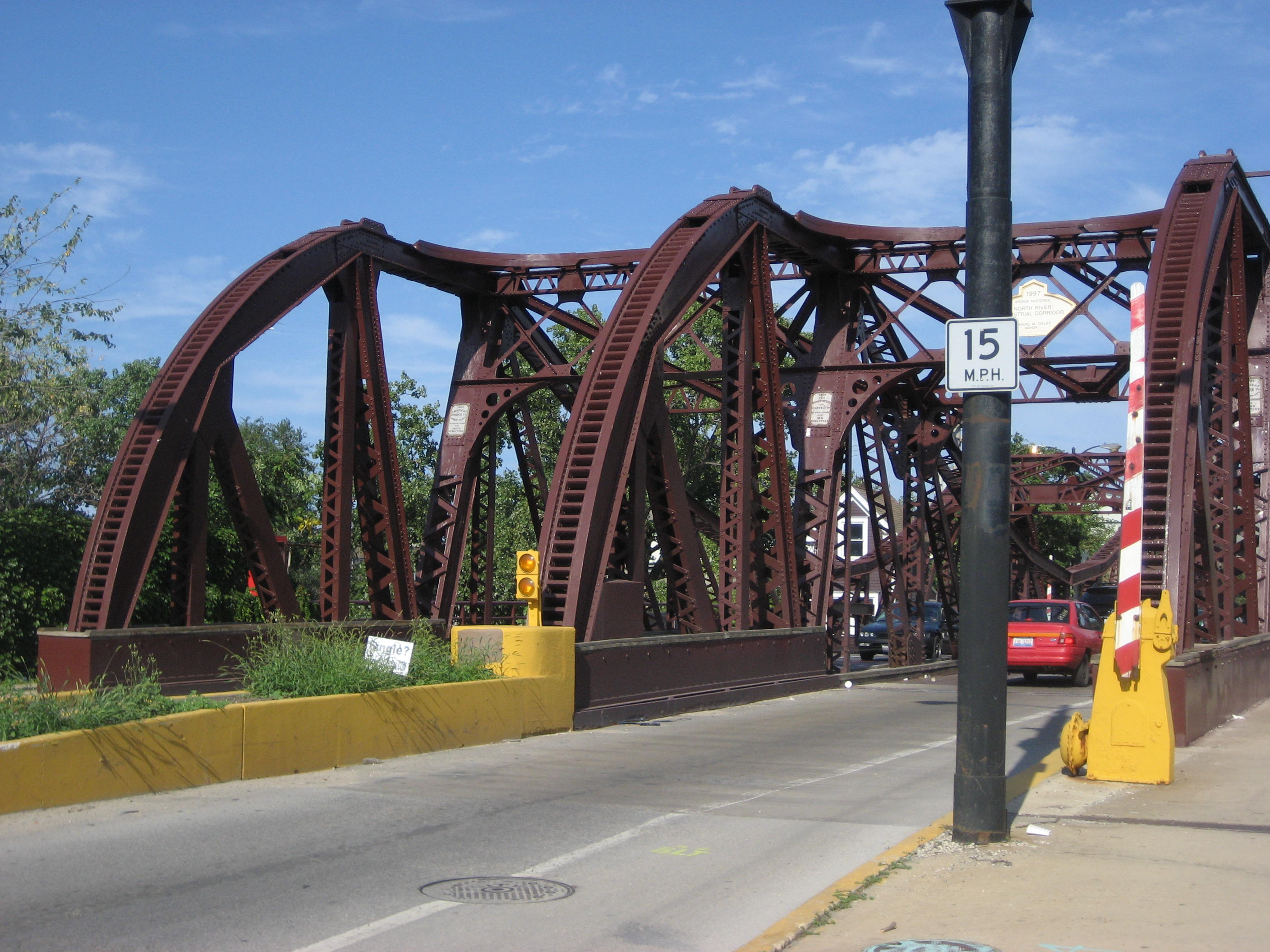
- Cortland Street Drawbridge 2007
- Coordinates: 41.9170°N 87.6643°W
- Carries: Motor vehicles, pedestrians and bicycles
- Crosses: north branch of the Chicago River
- Locale: Chicago, Illinois
- Official name: Cortland Street Drawbridge

Characteristics
- Design: Chicago trunnion bascule bridge
- Material: Steel
- Total length: 39 metres (128 ft)

History
- Designer: John Ernst Ericson and Edward Wilmann
- Opened: 1902

Chicago Landmark
- Designated: July 24, 1991

Location
- Interactive map of Cortland Street Drawbridge

The Cortland Street Drawbridge (originally known as the Clybourn Place drawbridge) over the Chicago River is the original Chicago-style fixed-trunnion bascule bridge, designed by John Ericson and Edward Wilmann. When it opened in 1902, on Chicago's north side, it was the first such bridge built in the United States. The bridge was a major advance in American movable bridge engineering, and was the prototype for over 50 additional bridges in Chicago alone. The bridge was designated as an ASCE Civil Engineering Landmark in 1981, and a Chicago Landmark in 1991.

== Design ==
This is the bridge type for which Chicago engineers are most well-known. The trunnion bascule has two bridge leaves with pivots on the opposing riverbanks and are raised on large trunnion bearings by large counterweights which offset the weight of the leaves. They take their names from the French word bascule, meaning seesaw, and the counterweights. Unlike most of the subsequent bascule bridges of Chicago, the gear rack that moves this bridge is visible above the roadway, on the curved arcs at each end of the superstructure.

== History ==
The bridge was built under the supervision of Mayor Carter Harrison, Jr., and Frederick W. Blocki, the Commissioner of Public Works.

This is the second bridge built on this site, which replaced a swing bridge with a mid-river pier supporting the swing span. The current bridge eliminated the need for the mid-river pier, allowing more room in the shipping channel.

While the machinery of the current bridge is intact, the bridge is no longer operable and the leaves are clamped together.

The bridge was traversed by streetcars of Line 73-Armitage Avenue, in addition to other traffic until February 25, 1951. The following day the bridge was temporarily closed for repairs and the Chicago Transit Authority (CTA) substituted buses for streetcars east of the bridge, subsequently abandoning the remainder of the Armitage Avenue streetcar line in June. Electric trolley buses also crossed the bridge, starting on February 1, 1953, when CTA replaced the motor buses on route 73. Trolley buses operated until October 15, 1966, when the agency converted the route to diesel buses.

The bridge is currently closed to vehicle traffic for refurbishment since September 22, 2025. Pedestrians and cyclists may still use the sidewalk on the north side. It is unknown when the bridge will be reopened as repairs are greater than anticipated.

== See also ==
- List of bridges documented by the Historic American Engineering Record in Illinois
