= Canal Street railroad bridge =

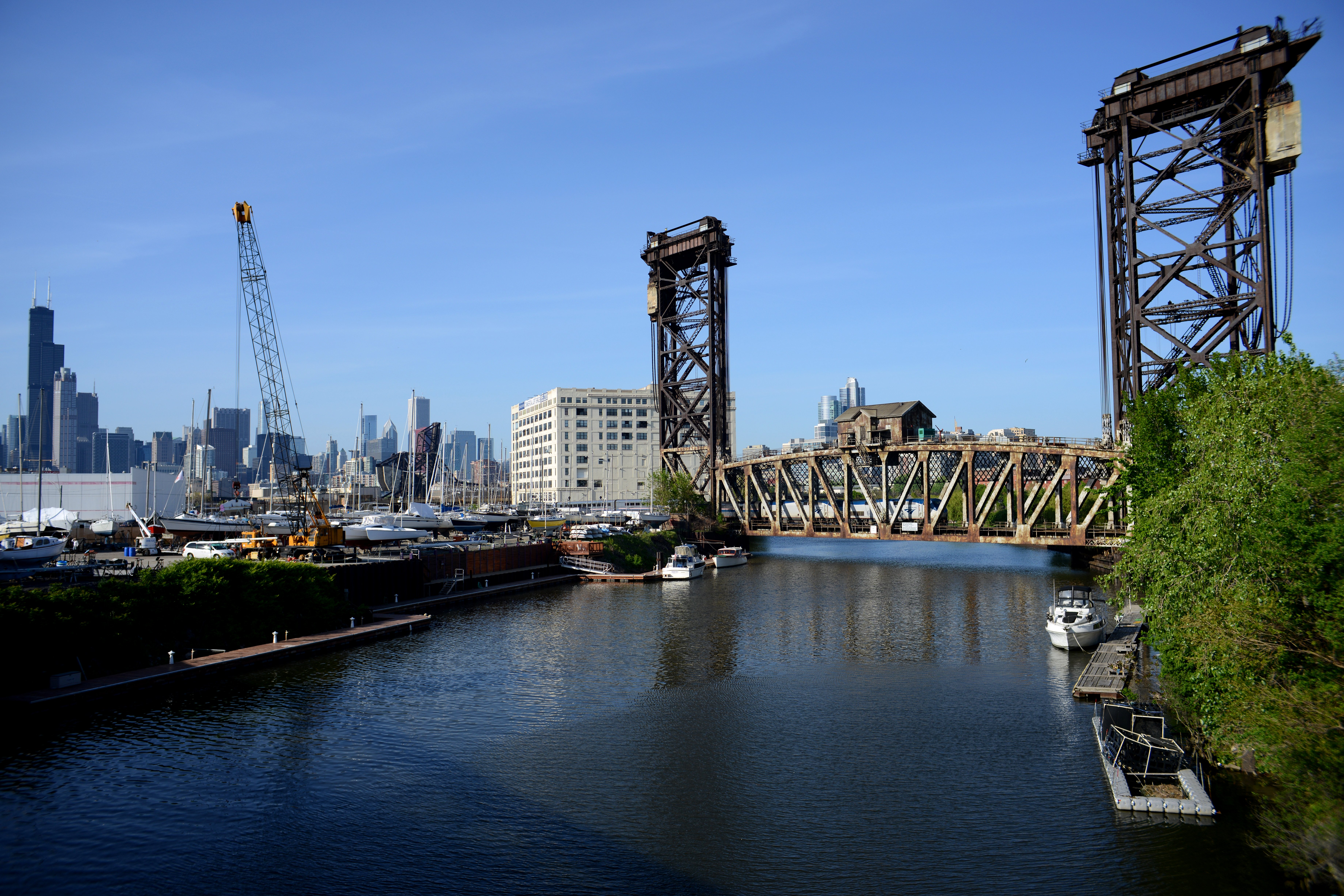
- Southbound Amtrak train crossing the South Branch Chicago River
- Coordinates: 41°51′20.3″N 87°38′13.2″W
- Carries: Amtrak, Metra, and freight trains
- Crosses: Chicago River
- Locale: Chicago
- Official name: Pennsylvania Railroad Bridge #458; Canal Street Railroad Bridge
- Other name: 21st Street Bridge
- Owner: Amtrak
- Heritage status: Chicago Landmark

Characteristics
- Design: vertical-lift bridge
- Longest span: 272.8 feet (83.1 m)

Rail characteristics
- No. of tracks: 2

History
- Designer: Waddell & Harrington
- Construction start: September 4, 1913
- Construction end: July 30, 1914

Statistics
- Daily traffic: Nearly 100 trains

Location
- Interactive map of Canal Street railroad bridge

The Canal Street railroad bridge (or Pennsylvania Railroad bridge) is a vertical-lift bridge across the south branch of the Chicago River in Chicago, Illinois. It was designated a Chicago Landmark on December 12, 2007.

== Construction ==
The present bridge was constructed for the Pennsylvania Railroad to replace a two-track swing bridge at the same location. The necessity to allow both continued use of the swing bridge and unimpeded river traffic during building work complicated construction of the bridge. The chosen solution was to construct the bridge in the raised position above the old bridge, then demolish the old bridge once construction was completed. The bridge was designed by Waddell & Harrington, and fabricated and erected by the Pennsylvania Steel Company.

Construction of the south tower began on September 4, 1913. When the two 185-foot (56 m) towers were completed, falsework for the main span was constructed in a fan shape that allowed the main span to be constructed in the raised position 130 feet (40 m) above the river. The bridge was built from steel and metal.

== Operation ==
The bridge carries two railroad tracks across the Chicago River at an angle of about 40 degrees to the center line of the river. Upon completion, the main span could be raised 111 feet (34 m) in about 45 seconds. The lift uses 64 cables and 32 pulleys, and the original bridge tender's cabin remains on the span although it is no longer used. By 1916, each day the bridge was crossed by about 300 trains, and was raised for river traffic about 75 times.

There are proposals for an additional or replacement bridge at Canal Street to support the full high-speed, high-frequency build out of the St. Louis-Chicago Lincoln Service passenger rail line.

== Trivia ==
When it was constructed in 1914, its 1500-ton main span was the heaviest of any vertical lift bridge in the United States. It is the only vertical-lift bridge across the Chicago River.

== Photo gallery ==
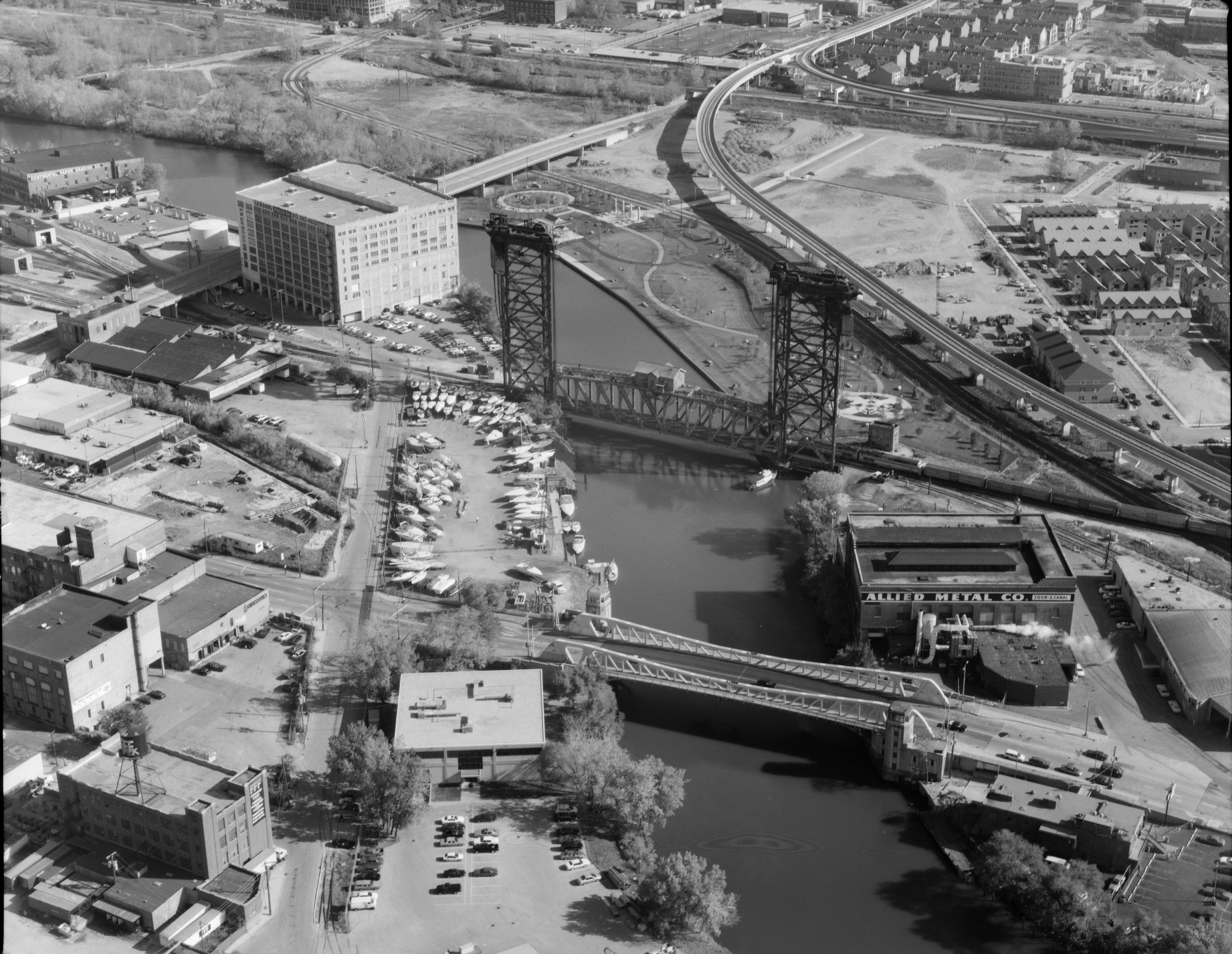

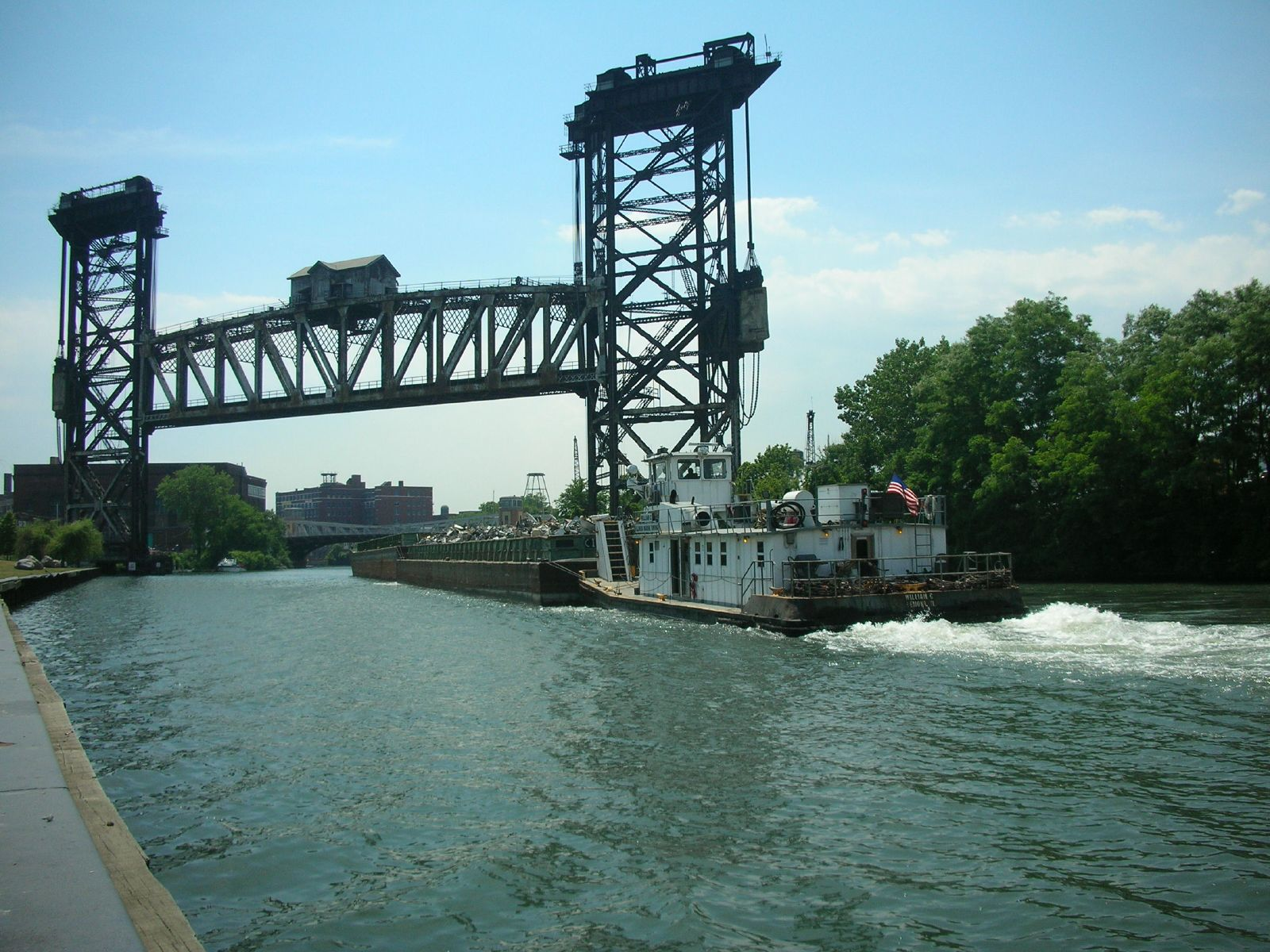

== See also ==
- List of bridges documented by the Historic American Engineering Record in Illinois
