= Ottawa Rail Bridge =

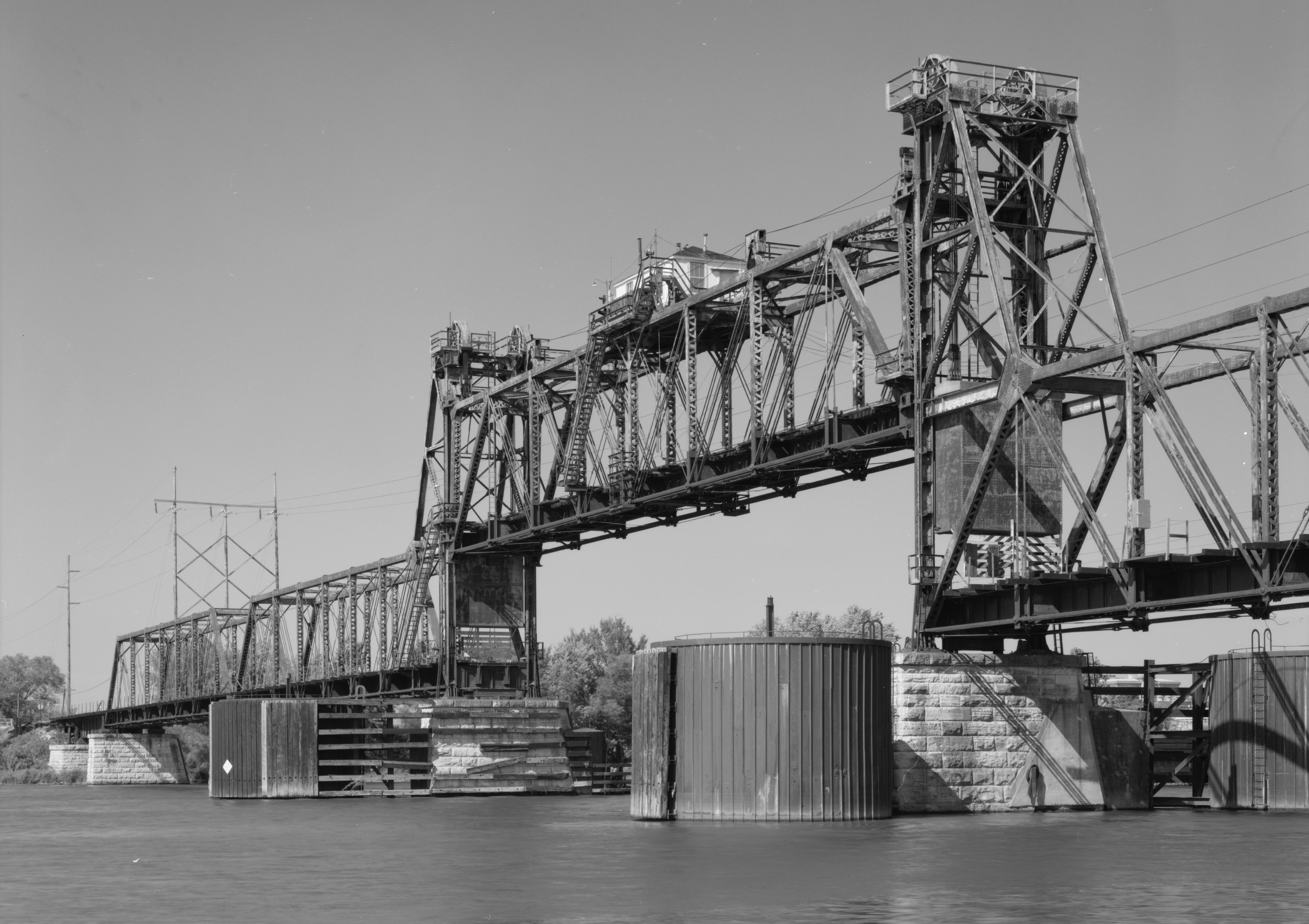
- Ottawa Rail Bridge in 1988.
- Coordinates: 41°20′30″N 88°50′49″W
- Carries: Illinois Railway
- Crosses: Illinois River
- Locale: Ottawa, Illinois
- Official name: Ottawa Rail Bridge
- Maintained by: Illinois Department of Transportation

Characteristics
- Design: Steel truss with lift span
- Width: 1 track
- Height: 21 feet (6.4 m) above water, 480 feet (150 m) above sea level

History
- Opened: 1898

Location
- Interactive map of Ottawa Rail Bridge

The Ottawa Rail Bridge is a railroad bridge spanning the Illinois River in the municipality of Ottawa, LaSalle County, Illinois. The first rail crossing on this site was constructed in 1871 by the Chicago, Burlington and Quincy Railroad, along a route leased from the Ottawa, Oswego and Fox River Valley Railroad between Ottawa and Streator, Illinois. The current bridge was constructed in 1898 by the King Bridge Company and altered in 1932 to include a vertical-lift span designed by Waddell & Harrington. The Illinois Railway now operates trains over the bridge on its Ottawa Branch between Streator and Montgomery, Illinois.

== See also ==
- List of bridges documented by the Historic American Engineering Record in Illinois
