= Ninth Street Seven Arch Stone Bridge =

- Formerly listed on the U.S. National Register of Historic Places
- Location within Illinois Location within the United States
- Location: Ninth Street spanning Deep Run Creek; Lockport, Will County, Illinois, U.S.
- Coordinates: 41°35′29″N 88°3′52″W
- Built: 1869
- Architectural style: Vernacular
- NRHP reference No.: 04000866

Significant dates
- Added to NRHP: August 20, 2004
- Removed from NRHP: August 28, 2012

The Ninth Street Seven Arch Stone Bridge was a historical bridge in Lockport, Illinois. The bridge was the region's first over the Des Plaines River, facilitating trade between farmers west of the river and merchants in Lockport. Farmers were previously forced to use a ford, located near 9th Street. It was approved on March 20, 1868, and cost $4,000. The arch bridge was constructed using locally quarried limestone in eight to twelve inch blocks. Each arch of the bridge spanned 197 foot (60 m). The builder is unknown, but may have been Julius Scheibe, a notable local mason who built many of the city's stone structures of the era. Schiebe was also a highway commissioner during the bridge's construction. A concrete slab had to be added to the foundation of the bridge in the early 1900s due to increased water levels caused by the Chicago Sanitary and Ship Canal. The Ninth Street Seven Arch Stone Bridge was closed to traffic in 1971 and was added to the National Register of Historic Places in 2004.

On March 8, 2011, the bridge sustained significant damage following a storm. The City of Lockport decided to demolish the bridge that spring. Pieces of the limestone will be used in historical displays.

== See also ==
- List of bridges documented by the Historic American Engineering Record in Illinois
- Lockport Historic District
