= St. Charles Air Line =

Rail corridor in Chicago

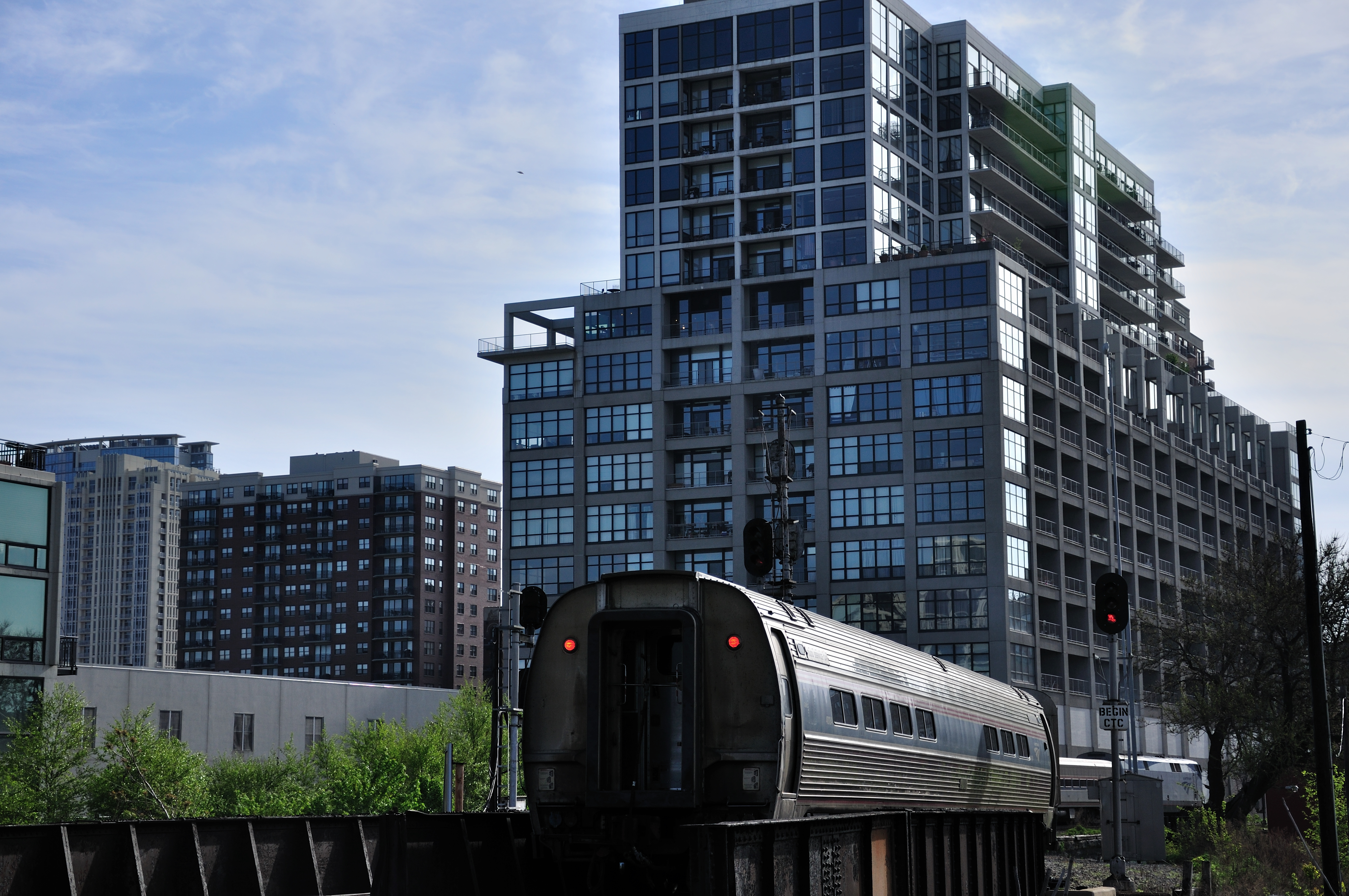
- Amtrak's Saluki traverses the Air Line in 2010.

Overview
- Owner: BNSF, UP, CN
- Locale: Chicago

History
- Opened: 1856

Technical
- Track gauge: 4 ft 8 1/2 in (1,435 mm) standard gauge

The St. Charles Air Line is a rail line in Chicago, Illinois, partially owned by the BNSF Railway, Union Pacific Railroad (UP), and Canadian National Railway (CN).

Built in the 19th century and extended and altered in the 20th and 21st, the line is today used by the Canadian National Railway for freight trains and by Amtrak passenger trains. The line runs from a point south of Union Station eastward to a junction with Canadian National Railway at the 16th Street Interlocking. (The CN line continues towards Lake Michigan, where it turns south under McCormick Place, passing over and then paralleling the Metra Electric District.)

== History ==
=== The St. Charles Branch Railroad ===
The St. Charles Air Line began as the St. Charles Branch Railroad, a four-mile link between the town of St. Charles, Illinois, and the Galena and Chicago Union Railroad (G&CU). This origin is the source of the phrase "St. Charles" in the Air Line's name.

The G&CU was chartered on January 16, 1836, to ship lead from mines around Galena, Illinois; to carry agricultural or manufactured products; and to provide passenger service. Like several other towns along the G&CU's proposed route, St. Charles desired to connect with the railroad to help ship local farm and business products. When the G&CU began laying track westward from Chicago in late 1848, leaders in St. Charles obtained a charter for their own railroad company. Established on January 31, 1849, the St. Charles Branch Railroad built its short line in less than a year, connecting to the G&CU at a point 33 miles from Chicago. Operations began on December 11, 1849, celebrated with a banquet at the Howard House in St. Charles. Hasty construction initially limited the track to horse-drawn cars, but by March 1852, the G&CU regularly scheduled freight and passenger service connecting with the St. Charles Branch.

=== The Chicago, St. Charles and Mississippi Air Line ===
On February 3, 1853, the St. Charles Branch Railroad changed its name to the Chicago, St. Charles and Mississippi Air Line Railroad. ("Air Line" was a phrase commonly used by railroads at the time to indicate the shortest, most direct route between destinations.) The Illinois legislature gave the reorganized company permission to build tracks between Chicago and St. Charles, either independently or in partnership with the G&CU. More importantly, the Air Line was authorized to build west to the Mississippi River, to a point somewhere between Savanna and Albany, Illinois. They were further given permission to build north from Savanna to Galena, and authorized to link with railroads in Iowa.

The Air Line's plan represented a serious threat to the Galena & Chicago Union's business. The G&CU's 1836 charter had given them priority rights to build "lateral routes," so they ordered their Chief Engineer to survey a second line due west from West Chicago, but on a more southerly route than the original line to Galena. The G&CU planned to cooperate first with the proposed Rockford and Rock Island Railroad, incorporated in 1851 to build from Rockford southwest to Rock Island, and then the Mississippi and Rock River Junction Railroad, also chartered in 1851 to build from the Illinois Central Railroad near Sterling to the Mississippi River at Fulton, Illinois. The Illinois legislature formally approved their plan on February 25, 1854, granting them the right to build west as far as Dixon, Illinois, and then to contract with another company or build their own line to the Mississippi.

The Chicago, St. Charles, and Mississippi had been capitalized up to $5 million, and they had done well in selling their stock. However, they made the mistake of promising that subscribers would only have to pay 25 per cent of the cost of each of their shares per year. This strangled the flow of funds for construction, so they could only afford to build ten miles of track, from the Chicago River west to the Des Plaines River. The G&CU's maneuvering also blocked any westward construction, putting an end to the Chicago, St. Charles and Mississippi's plans. However, the G&CU saw the property purchased by the St. Charles company for a depot in Chicago, at the northeast corner of Stewart Avenue and 16th Street, as a convenient location for the G&CU to connect to the Illinois Central and Michigan Central Railroads. They offered to pay $540,000 to the Chicago, St. Charles, and Mississippi for the depot grounds and the ten miles of track that had been constructed. Chas. E. Fisher reports that the St. Charles directors "were glad to sell"; the G&CU was relieved to dispose of "a formidable rival."

=== The St. Charles Air Line ===
The G&CU completed its purchase of the Chicago, St. Charles and Mississippi in early 1856. By June of that year, they had built a 1.25-mile link from their own line at "Harlem Junction" (now Oak Park) to the western terminus of the Air Line's ten-mile stretch, allowing their trains access to the Air Line's depot. On March 30, the G&CU and, by previous agreement, the Chicago, Burlington and Quincy Railroad (CB&Q) began using the new line to reach the Illinois Central's Central Station.

Eventually the St. Charles Air Line, an unincorporated jointly owned line, was formed as a reorganization of the project.

The planned alignment west of Western Avenue was later used by the Chicago and Northern Pacific Railroad, and piers in the Fox River at St. Charles had influenced predecessors of the Chicago Great Western Railway to build their line through that town.

The CB&Q also built a line into Chicago, intersecting the Air Line at Western Avenue. Eventually, the line came under equal control of the four companies that used it: the CB&Q, Illinois Central, Michigan Central, and G&CU successor Chicago and North Western Railway.

The Air Line's track was originally on ground level with numerous street crossings. In the late 1890s, work was begun to raise the line onto fill and replace the grade crossings with overpasses.

Initially, the east end of the Air Line connected with the IC with tracks that curved to the north to serve Central Station and the yards and warehouses through downtown up to the Chicago River. Passenger trains descended a relatively short and steep ramp into Central Station; freight trains used a longer, less severe incline.

=== 20th century ===
In 1968, a southward-facing connection was built to enable trains using the Air Line to travel directly to and from the south. It became known as the South Leg because it formed a wye with the original lines that was occasionally used to turn passenger trains around.

After the coming of Amtrak in May 1971, the remaining passenger trains were gradually shifted from Central Station to Union Station. Meanwhile, the yards to the north were gradually eliminated, leaving an area that would be redeveloped as the Illinois Center office, hotel, and retail complex. Central Station closed in 1972 and was razed in 1974. The northern connections were eventually removed; today, the South Leg is the only connection from the IC mainline to the Air Line.

In the 1980s and 1990s, Chicago city planners wanted to tear down the St. Charles Air Line as part of initiatives to redevelop Chicago's Near South Side neighborhood. Chicago has since reversed its position, adopting plans to run more transit and intercity passenger trains on the St. Charles Air Line.

== Current status ==
The CB&Q has become part of the BNSF Railway, and the C&NW is now part of the Union Pacific Railroad, each of which still owns a one-quarter share. The MCRR has sold its share to the Illinois Central, now owned by the Canadian National Railway.

As of 2011, the St. Charles Air Line hosted six Amtrak trains per day, including City of New Orleans, Illini, and Saluki, which perform a time-consuming switchback into Union Station from its west end.

About four to five CN freight trains pass through daily. In 2011, a CN employee timetable dated July 2011 said: "St. Charles Air Line is a connection between Metra 16th St. Interlocking and BNSF Union Ave. BNSF and UP jointly own the line between Union Ave. and a point 70 feet west of the Bascule Bridge over the South Branch of the Chicago River. CN owns the line from that point to 16th St....Both tracks are designated Non-Main Track, CN Rule 520 applies, and is also designated East-West. The north track is Track 1, and the south track is Track 2....The bridge is controlled by CSX Bridge Tender."

As of 2015, the Chicago Region Environmental and Transportation Efficiency Program (CREATE) was in the preliminary design phase for the Grand Crossing Project. This project will reroute the passenger trains from St. Charles Air Line to Norfolk Southern's Chicago Line in the Greater Grand Crossing neighborhood in Chicago.

In 2019, CN begin a track realignment program to the east of the St. Charles Air Line Bridge. The realignment changed a double-track section to single track in an east-west corridor running north of 16th St., which originally consisted of four elevated lines laid over two parallel series of viaducts that cross five streets and two alleys. Replacement of the viaduct bridges was finished in 2020, and the entire project was completed in 2021 after the placement of about 4,000 feet (1,200 m) of track.

As of October 2021, a large project was nearing completion to replace a bridge passing over the future Wells Street Extension, and rebuild retaining walls on both lines between the 16th St. interlocking and the Chicago River. This section of the line has been inactive since May 2020, when the adjacent St. Charles Air Line Bascule Bridge crossing the river was elevated due to work on the west side of the river.

In 2022, Amtrak began seeking grants to build a direct connection between the St. Charles Air Line and Union Station to avoid the switchback maneuver. Amtrak might also try to lease or buy the St. Charles Air Line to relieve congestion for its passenger trains. As part of the congestion relief effort, Amtrak wanted to reroute its Michigan and East Coast trains onto the St. Charles Air Line after the Union Station direct link was made, and it applied for funding to restore the roughly 1 mile (1.6 km) double-track alignment that CN just removed. However, the funding requests were largely rejected in the December 2023 funding round of the federal government's Corridor Identification and Development Program.

In 2025, control of the crossing of Metra's Rock Island District and CN's St. Charles Air Line was shifted from the interlocking tower at 16th Street, which began operations in 1901, to Metra's Consolidated Control Facility, two-thirds of a mile away across the Chicago River at 15th and Canal streets.

== See also ==
- St. Charles Air Line Bridge
- Geographic data related to St. Charles Air Line at OpenStreetMap
