= Chicago Terminal Railroad =

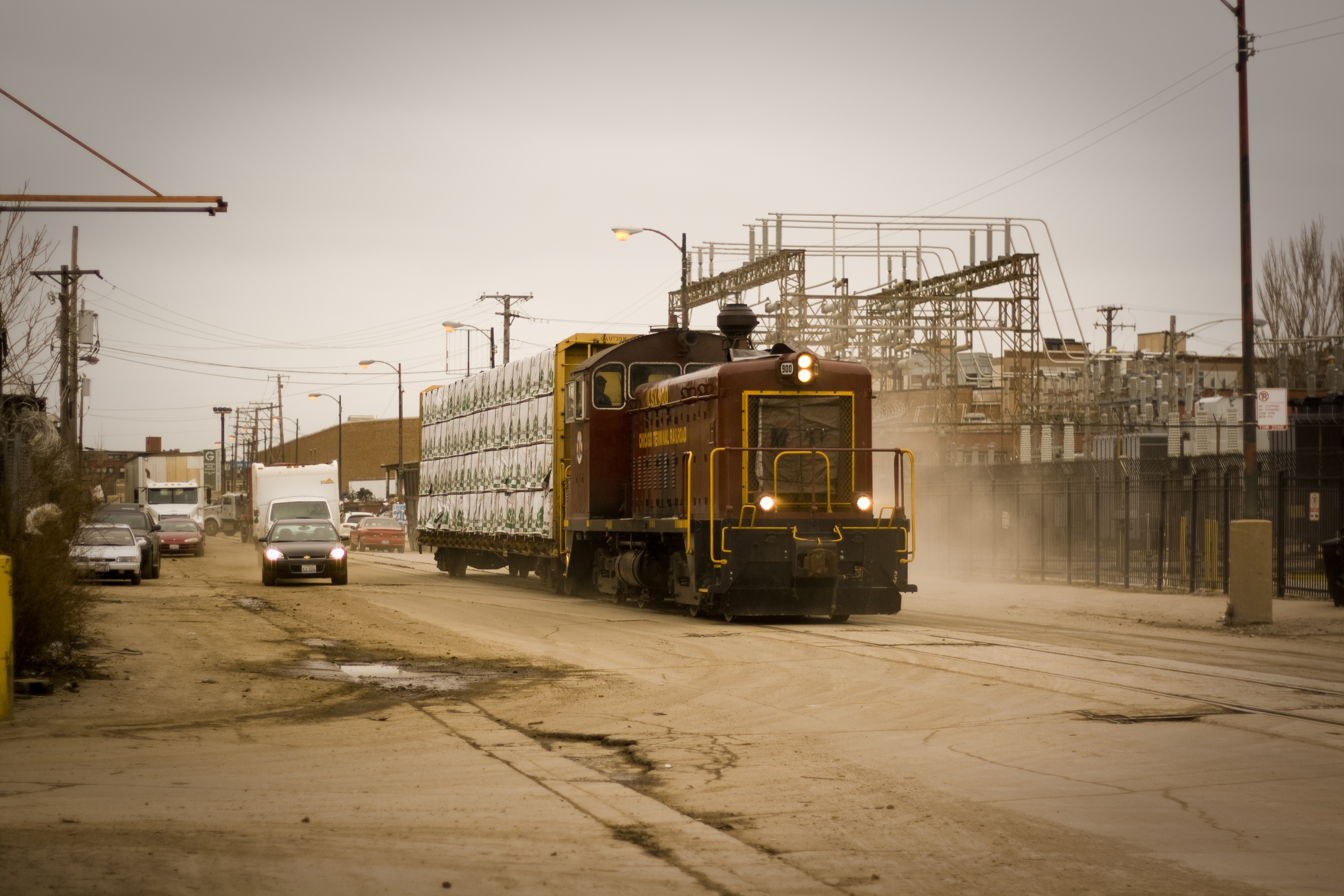
- A switcher on Kingsbury Street.

Overview
- Headquarters: Chicago, Illinois
- Reporting mark: CTM
- Locale: Chicago, Illinois
- Dates of operation: 2007–2019

Technical
- Track gauge: 4 ft 8 1/2 in (1,435 mm) standard gauge

The Chicago Terminal Railroad (reporting mark CTM) was a switching and terminal railroad that operated over former Milwaukee Road/Canadian Pacific and Chicago and North Western/Union Pacific trackage in northern Illinois. The railroad began its operations on January 2, 2007. The railroad rostered a total of three locomotive units, all of EMD design.

== Routes ==
- CTM Chicago Operations: The first routes acquired by CTM on January 2, 2007, from Canadian Pacific were the remnants of the former Milwaukee Road Chicago & Evanston (C&E), Deering, and Chicago & Pacific (aka Bloomingdale Line) branch lines in the city of Chicago. CTM ran from the Union Pacific North Avenue Yard where it was a tenant, north to the Bloomingdale Line, then east across a swing bridge over the North Branch of the Chicago River to C&E Junction in the middle of Kingsbury Street south of Cortland Avenue. From there one end went north to Peerless Confectionery at Lakewood and Diversey on the C&E North Line with a lead coming off at Kingsbury just north of Cortland where a remnant of the Deering Line was used to service Finkl Steel. South of C&E Junction CTM operated down Kingsbury Street to where the tracks ended just north of Division Street with another lead (former C&P) veering off from the C&E South Line on Kingsbury just north of North Avenue. The Goose Island lead went south and crossed North Avenue, then over an arm of the Chicago River on the Cherry Street bridge to service Big Bay Lumber on Cherry just past Division on Goose Island. At its peak, CTM in Chicago serviced just four industries it inherited: Finkl Steel, Peerless Confectionery, Big Bay Lumber, and General Iron Industries. It had joint access to Sipi Metals along with UP off the former Rolling Mill Yard area across from the Kennedy Expressway.

This CTM operation was notable for its extensive operations on street trackage, especially on Lakewood Avenue, Kingsbury Street, and Cherry Avenue.

The last revenue run by CTM was in 2015 to Big Bay Lumber. Later CTM would store empty freight cars on various parts of the tracks.

The line was formally abandoned in 2019, with the City of Chicago acquiring the rights to reactivate rail service while pursuing conversion of the line to a rail trail at the same time.

- Centex Industrial Park: The CTM took over operations in this location from the Central Illinois Railroad in April 2007. Located in Elk Grove Village, Illinois, this is former Chicago and North Western trackage that was operated by Union Pacific until 2001. In 2018, Progressive Rail took over Operations on this line under the name Chicago Junction Railway.
- Bensenville Industrial Park: Located roughly adjacent to the Elk Grove Village operation, this former Milwaukee Road branch was leased to the CTM by Canadian Pacific in 2007. Progressive Rail took over this line in 2019, operating it as the Chicago, St Paul & Pacific Railroad (not to be confused with the Chicago, Milwaukee, St. Paul & Pacific Railroad).
