= Chicago River =

System of rivers and canals in Chicago

Coordinates: 41°53′11″N 87°38′15″W

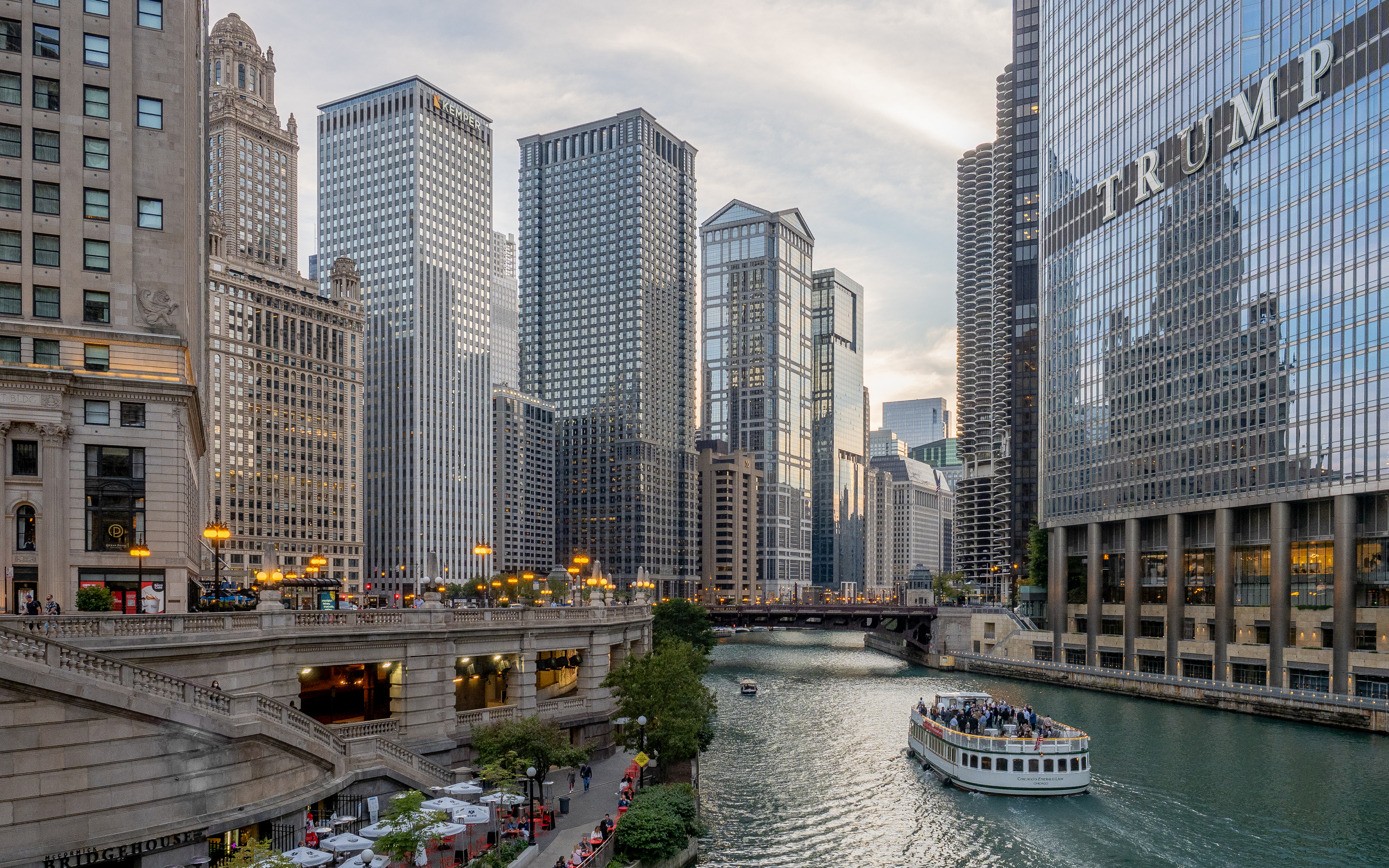
- Chicago River, September 2021

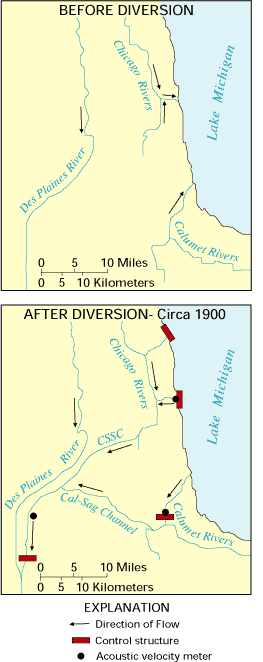
- Map of river and flow directions, before and after re-engineering flow via the canal system. Note the "Before" does not show the existing Illinois and Michigan Canal (built 1848), which generally did not affect flow direction.

Location
- Country: United States
- State: Illinois

Physical characteristics
- Source: Lake Michigan
- Length: 156 mi (251 km)

Basin features
- Progression: Chicago River → South Branch → Chicago Sanitary and Ship Canal → Des Plaines River → Illinois River → Mississippi River → Gulf of Mexico
- Tributaries
  - left: South Fork Chicago River
  - right: North Branch Chicago River

The Chicago River is a system of rivers and canals with a combined length of 156 miles (251 km) that runs through the city of Chicago, including its center (the Chicago Loop). The river is one of the reasons for Chicago's geographic importance: the related Chicago Portage is a link between the Great Lakes and the Mississippi River Basin, and ultimately the Gulf of Mexico.

In 1887, the Illinois General Assembly decided to reverse the flow of the Chicago River through civil engineering by taking water from Lake Michigan and discharging it into the Mississippi River watershed, partly in response to concerns created by an extreme weather event in 1885 that threatened the city's water supply. (Note: These events are the basis of the Chicago 1885 cholera epidemic myth.) In 1889, the state created the Chicago Sanitary District (now the Metropolitan Water Reclamation District) to replace the Illinois and Michigan Canal with the Chicago Sanitary and Ship Canal, a much larger waterway, because the former had become inadequate to serve the city's increasing sewage and commercial navigation needs. Completed by 1900, the project reversed the flow of the main stem and South Branch and altered the flow of the North Branch by using a series of canal locks and pumping stations, increasing the flow from Lake Michigan into the river, causing the river to empty into the new canal instead. In 1999, the system was named a "Civil Engineering Monument of the Millennium" by the American Society of Civil Engineers (ASCE).

The river is represented on the municipal flag of Chicago by two horizontal blue stripes. Its three branches serve as the inspiration for the municipal device, a three-branched, Y-shaped symbol that is found on many buildings and other structures throughout Chicago.

== Course ==
When it followed its natural course, the North and South Branches of the Chicago River converged at Wolf Point to form the main stem, which jogged southward from the present course of the river to avoid a baymouth bar, entering Lake Michigan at about the level of present-day Madison Street. Today, the main stem of the Chicago River flows west from Lake Michigan to Wolf Point, where it converges with the North Branch to flow into the South Branch, where the river's course goes south and west to empty in the Chicago Sanitary and Ship Canal.

=== North Branch ===
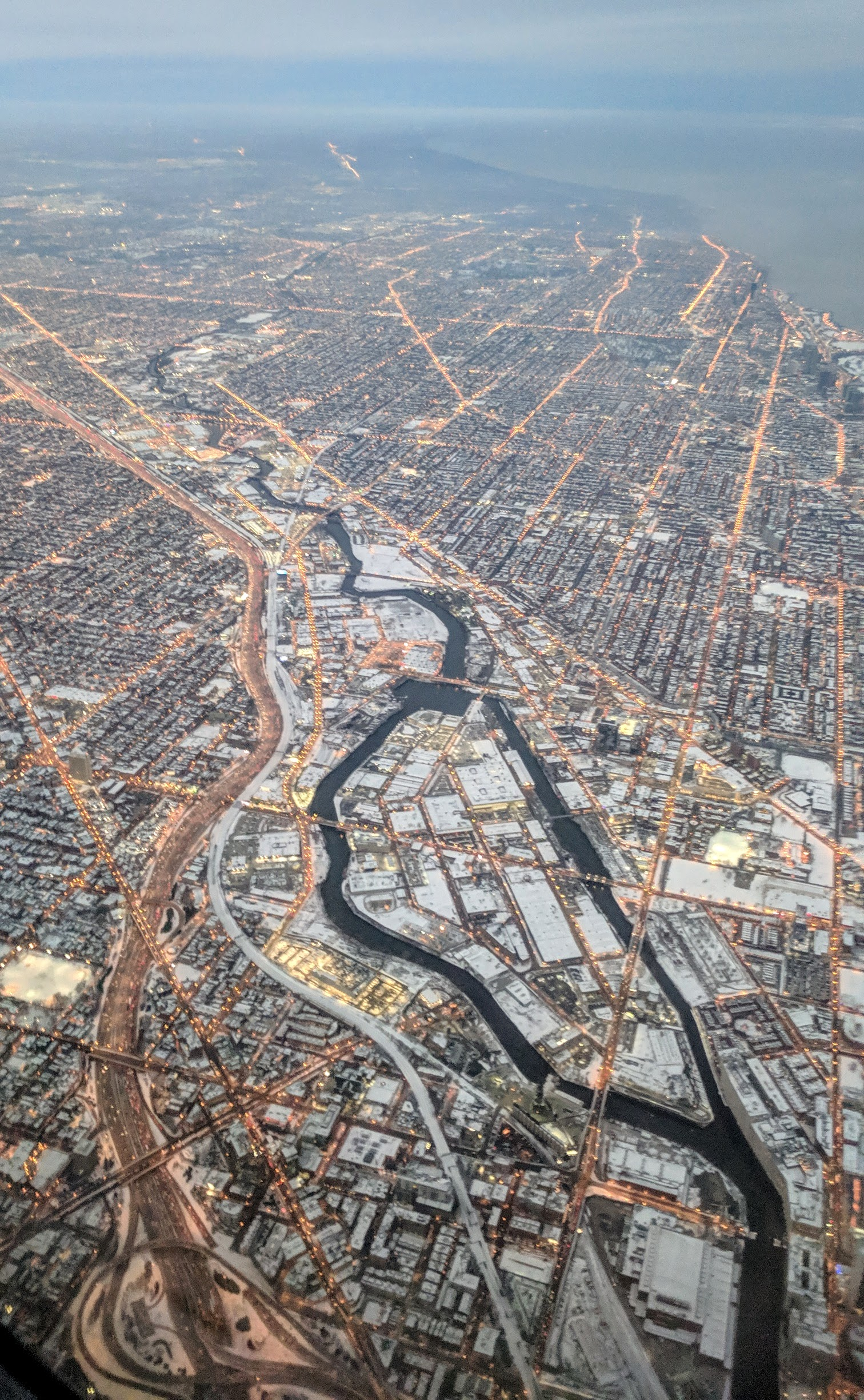
Aerial view of the North Branch of the Chicago River, from the south, with Goose Island, near center

Early settlers named the North Branch of the Chicago River the Guarie River, or Gary's River, after a trader who may have settled the west bank of the river a short distance north of Wolf Point, at what is now Fulton Street. The source of the North Branch is in the northern suburbs of Chicago where its three principal tributaries converge. The Skokie River—or East Fork—rises from a flat plain, historically a wetland, near Park City, Illinois to the west of the city of Waukegan. It then flows southward, paralleling the shore of Lake Michigan, through wetlands, the Greenbelt Forest Preserve and a number of golf courses towards Highland Park, Illinois. South of Highland Park the river passes the Chicago Botanic Gardens and through an area of former marshlands known as the Skokie Lagoons. From the west, the Middle Fork arises near Rondout, Illinois and flows southwards through Lake Forest and Highland Park. The two tributaries of the North and Middle forks merge at the Watersmeet Woods forest preserve west of Wilmette. From there the North Branch flows south towards Morton Grove. The third tributary, the West Fork, rises near Mettawa and flows south through Lincolnshire, Bannockburn, Deerfield, and Northbrook, meeting the North Branch at Morton Grove. In recognition of the work of Ralph Frese in promoting canoeing on and conservation of Chicago-area rivers, the Forest Preserve District of Cook County has designated a section of the East Fork and North Branch from Willow Road in Northfield to Dempster Street in Morton Grove the Ralph Frese River Trail.

The North Branch continues southwards through Niles, entering the city of Chicago near the intersection of Milwaukee Avenue and Devon Avenue, from where it serves as the boundary of the Forest Glen community area with Norwood Park and Jefferson Park. This stretch of the river meanders in a south-easterly direction, passing through golf courses and forest preserves until it reaches Foster Avenue, where it passes through residential neighborhoods on the north side of the Albany Park community area. In River Park the river meets the North Shore Channel, a canal with water pumped from Lake Michigan (at Wilmette), built between 1907 and 1910 to increase the flow of the North Branch and help flush it into the South Branch and from there to the Chicago Sanitary and Ship Canal. From the confluence with the North Shore Channel south to Belmont Avenue the North Branch flows through mostly residential neighborhoods in a man-made channel that was dug to straighten and deepen the river, helping it to carry the additional flow from the North Shore Channel.

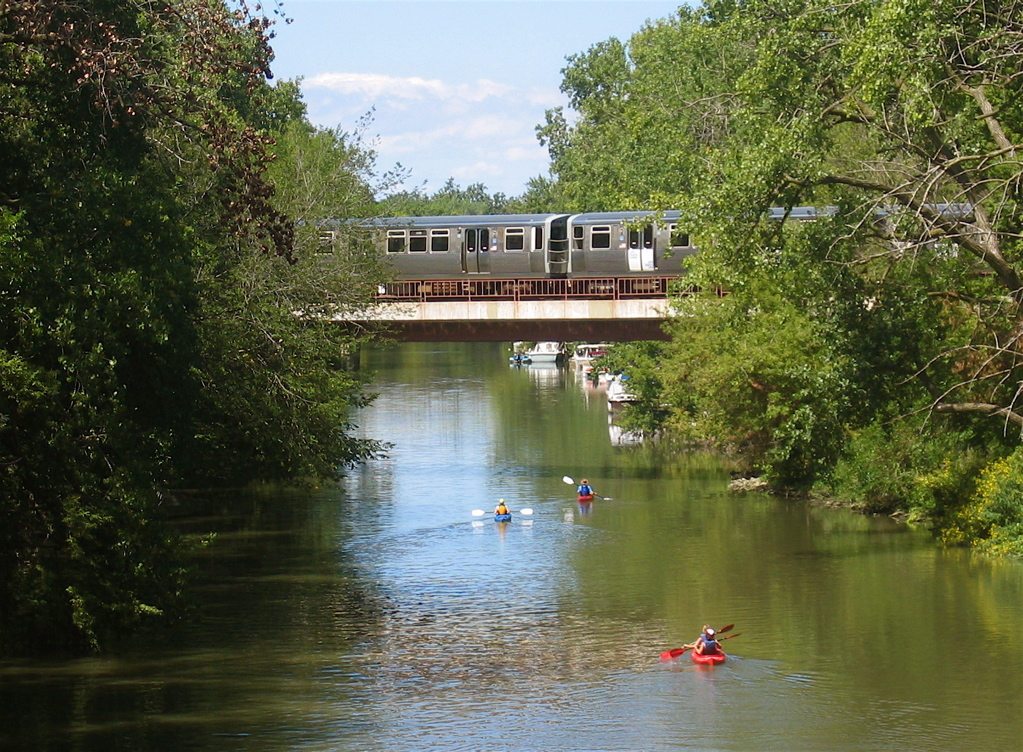
The Chicago 'L' Ravenswood train (Brown Line) crossing the north branch of the Chicago River

South of Belmont the North Branch is lined with a mixture of residential developments, retail parks, and industry until it reaches the industrial area known as the Clybourn Corridor. Here it passes beneath the Cortland Street Drawbridge, which was the first "Chicago-style" fixed-trunnion bascule bridge built in the United States, and is designated as an ASCE Civil Engineering Landmark and a Chicago Landmark.

At North Avenue, south of the North Avenue Bridge, the North Branch divides: the original course of the river makes a curve along the west side of Goose Island, whilst the North Branch Canal cuts off the bend, forming the island. The North Branch Canal—or Ogden's Canal—was completed in 1857, and was originally 50 feet (15 m) wide and 10 feet (3.0 m) deep, allowing craft navigating the river to avoid the bend. The 1902 Cherry Avenue Bridge, just south of North Avenue, was constructed to carry the Chicago, Milwaukee and St. Paul Railway onto Goose Island. It is a rare example of an asymmetric bob-tail swing bridge and was designated a Chicago Landmark in 2007. From Goose Island the North Branch continues to flow south east to Wolf Point where it joins the main stem.

=== Main stem ===
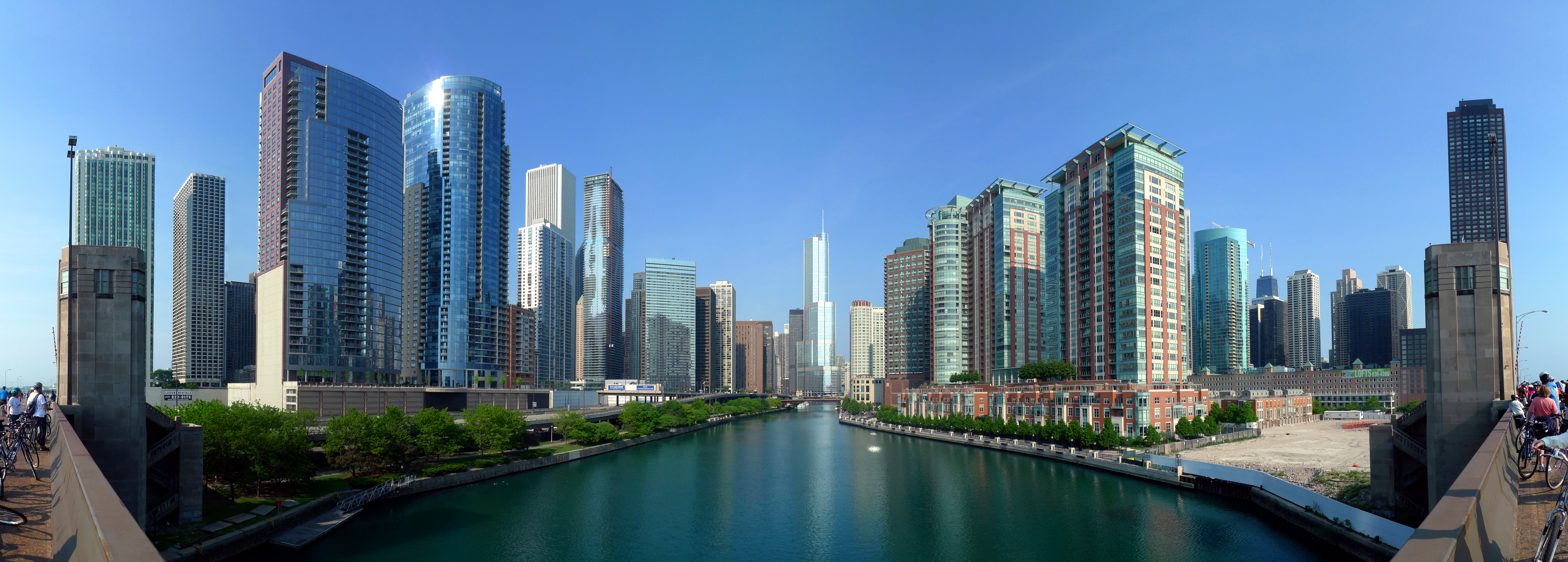
View west along the main stem of the Chicago River from the Outer Drive Bridge, 2009

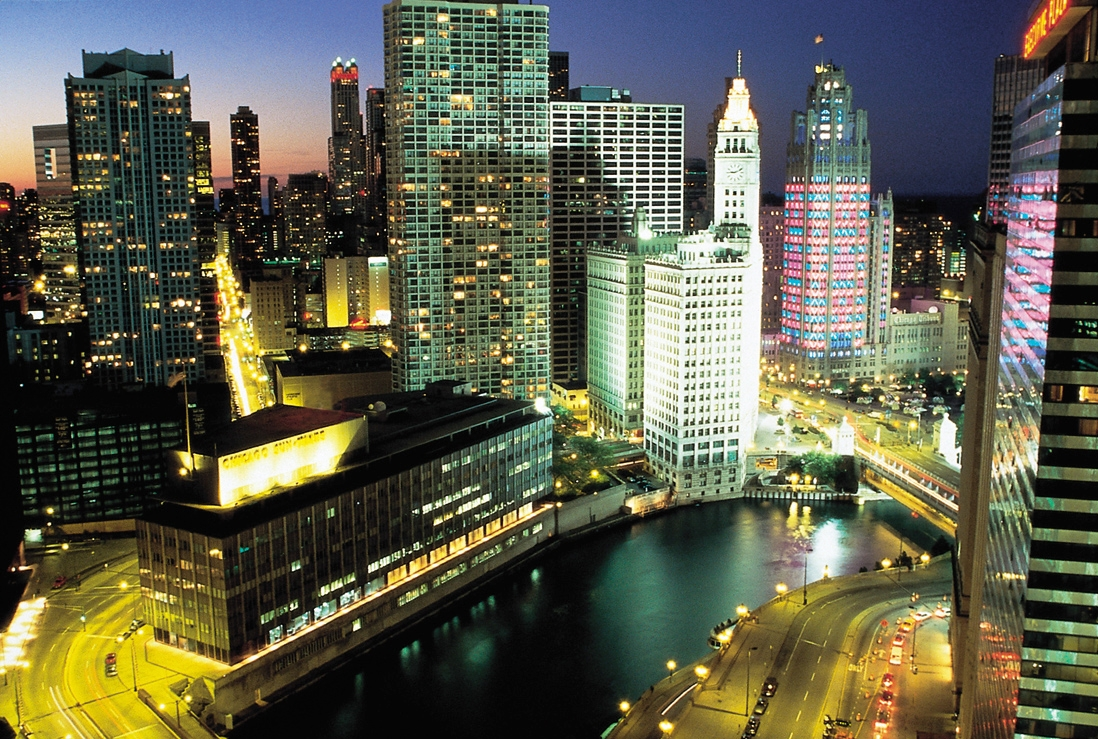
The main stem of the river, Wrigley Building, and Tribune Tower at night.

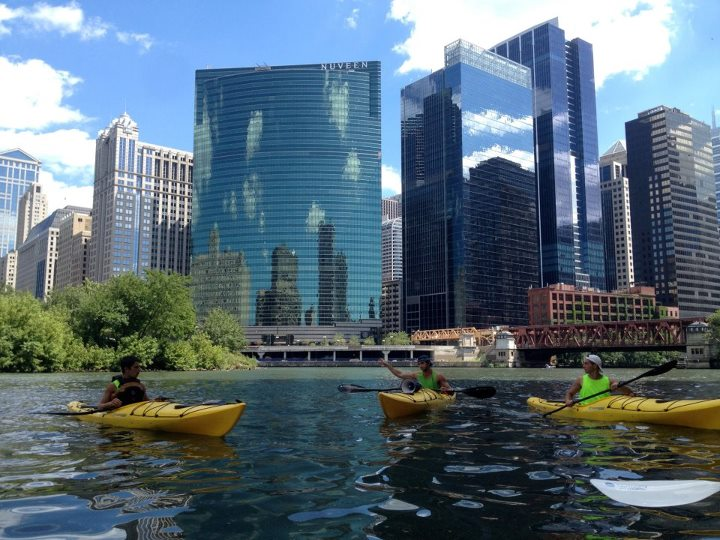
Kayakers take a break at Wolf Point with 333 West Wacker, Lake Street Bridge and the south skyline in the background

Since the late 19th century, the source of the main stem of the Chicago River is Lake Michigan. Water enters the river through sluice gates at the Chicago River Controlling Works with a small additional flow provided for the passage of boats between the river and Lake Michigan through the Chicago Harbor Lock. The surface level of the river is maintained at 0.5 to 2 feet (0.15 to 0.61 m) below the Chicago City Datum (579.48 feet [176.63 m] above mean sea level) except for when there is excessive storm run-off into the river or when the level of the lake is more than 2 feet below the Chicago City Datum. Acoustic velocity meters at the Columbus Drive Bridge and the T. J. O'Brien lock on the Calumet River monitor the diversion of water from Lake Michigan to the Mississippi River basin, which is limited to an average of 3,200 cubic feet (91 m^{3}) per second per year over the 40-year period from 1980 to 2020.

The main stem flows 1.5 miles (2.4 km) west from the controlling works at Lake Michigan; passing beneath the Outer Drive, Columbus Drive, Michigan Avenue, Wabash Avenue, State Street, Dearborn Street, Clark Street, La Salle Street, Wells Street, and Franklin Street bridges en route to its confluence with the North Branch at Wolf Point. At McClurg Court it passes the Centennial Fountain, which was built in 1989 to celebrate the 100th anniversary of the Metropolitan Water Reclamation District of Greater Chicago; between May and October the fountain sends an arc of water over the river for ten minutes every hour. On the north bank of the river, near the Chicago Landmark Michigan Avenue Bridge, is Pioneer Court, which marks the site of the homestead of Jean Baptiste Point du Sable who is recognized as the founder of Chicago. On the south bank of the river is the site of Fort Dearborn, an army fort, first established in 1803. Notable buildings surrounding this area include the NBC Tower, the Tribune Tower, and the Wrigley Building. The river turns slightly to the south west between Michigan Avenue and State Street, passing the Trump International Hotel and Tower, 35 East Wacker, and 330 North Wabash. Turning west again the river passes Marina City, the Reid, Murdoch & Co. Building, and Merchandise Mart, and 333 Wacker Drive.

Since the early 2000s, the south shore of the main stem has been developed as the Chicago Riverwalk. It provides a linear, lushly landscaped park intended to offer a peaceful escape from the busy Loop and a tourist attraction. Different sections are named Market, Civic, Arcade, and Confluence. The plans reflect ideas first proposed by the Burnham Plan as early as 1909.

=== South Branch ===
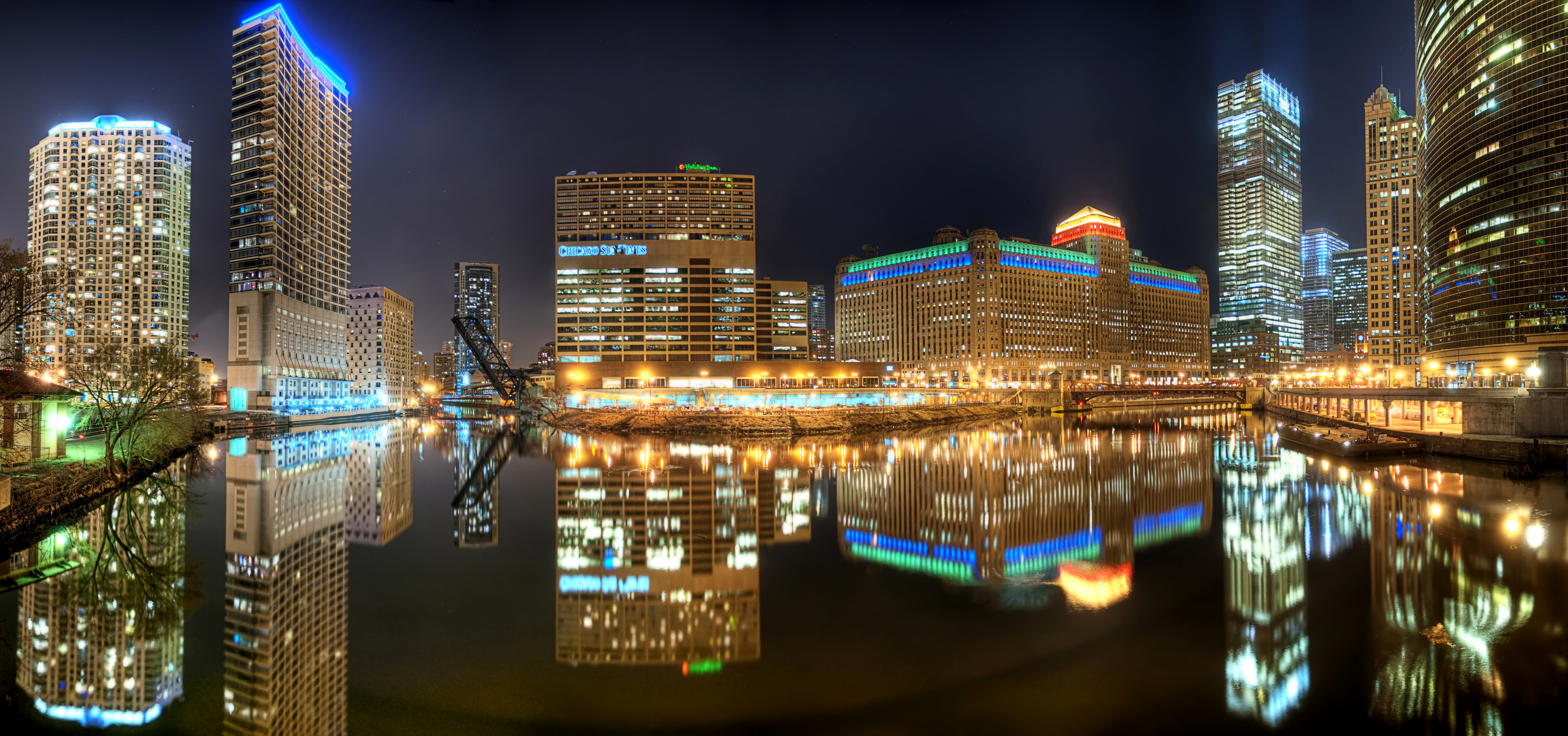
A view of the Chicago River from the South Branch, looking toward the main stem (right) and the North Branch (upper left) at Wolf Point in 2009

Before reversal, the South Branch generally arose with joining forks in the marshy area called Mud Lake to flow to where it met the North Branch at Wolf Point forming the main branch. Since reversal, the source of the South Branch of the Chicago River is the confluence of the North Branch and main stem at Wolf Point. From here the river flows south passing the Lake Street, Randolph Street, Washington Street, Madison Street, Monroe Street, Adams Street, Jackson Boulevard, Van Buren Street, Ida B. Wells Drive, and Harrison Street bridges before leaving the downtown Loop community area. Notable buildings that line this stretch of the river include the Boeing Company World Headquarters, the Civic Opera House, the Chicago Mercantile Exchange, Union Station and Willis Tower.

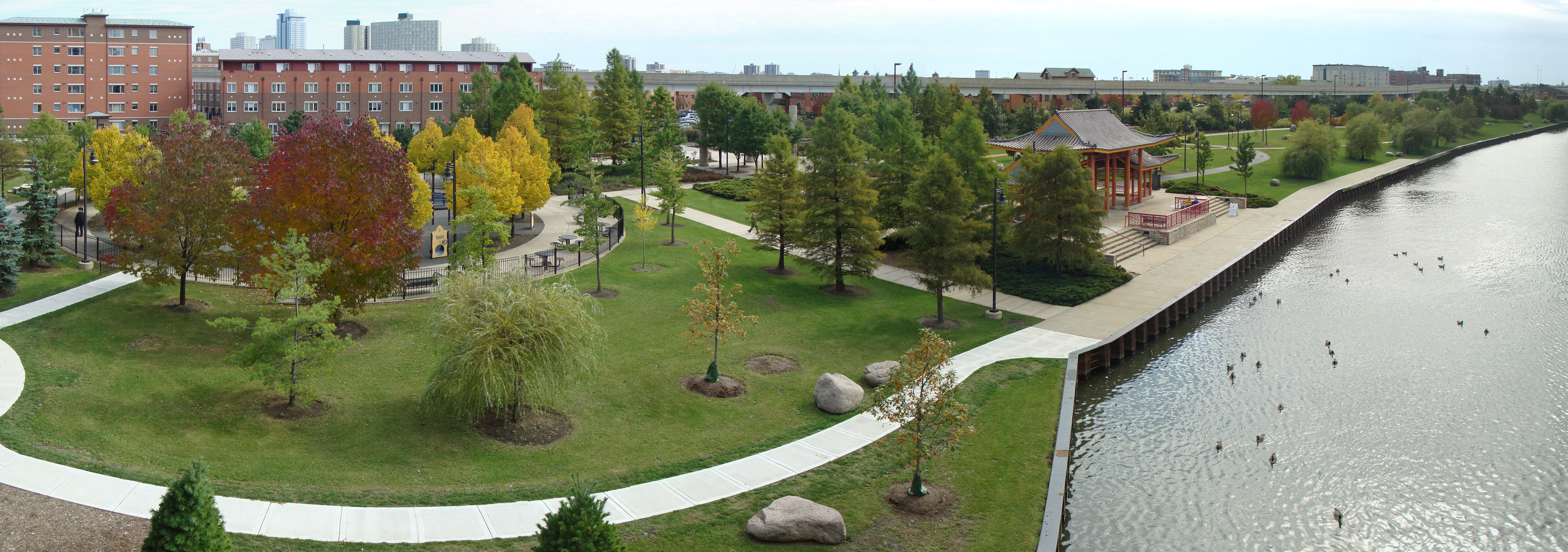
South Branch at Ping Tom Memorial Park

The river continues southwards past railroad yards and the St. Charles Air Line Bridge. Between Polk and 18th Streets the river originally made a meander to the east; between 1927 and 1929 the river was straightened and moved 1/4 mile (0.40 km) west at this point to make room for a railroad terminal. The river turns to the southwest at Ping Tom Memorial Park where it passes under the Chicago Landmark Canal Street railroad bridge. The river turns westward where it is crossed by the Dan Ryan Expressway; these immovable bridges have a clearance of 60 feet (18 m) requiring large ships that pass underneath to have folding masts.

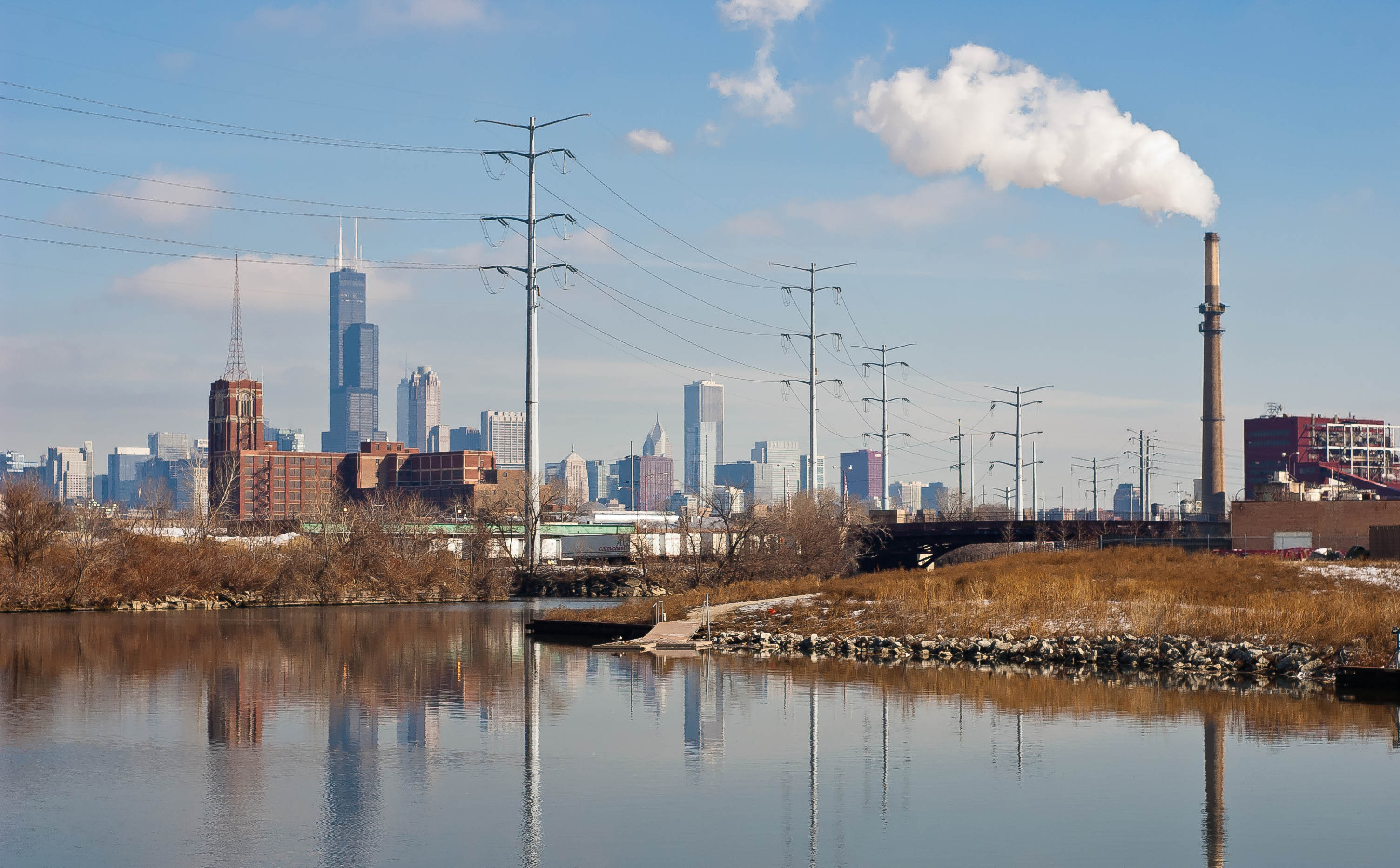
View from the U.S. Turning Basin towards the Chicago Loop

At Ashland Avenue the river widens to form the U.S. Turning Basin, the west bank of which was the starting point of the Illinois and Michigan Canal. Prior to 1983, this was where the US Coast Guard Rules of the Road, Great Lakes ended & Rules of the Road, Western Rivers began. Since 1983, there is just a single Inland Navigational Rules passed by Congressional Act in 1980 (Public Law 96-591). At the basin the river is joined by a tributary, the South Fork of the river, which is commonly given the nickname Bubbly Creek. A bridge used to span the South Fork at this point that was too low for boats to pass meaning that their cargo needed to be unloaded at the bridge, and the neighborhood at its east end became known as Bridgeport. The river continues to the south west, entering the Chicago Sanitary and Ship Canal at Damen Avenue. The original West Fork of the South Branch, which before 1935 led towards Mud Lake and the Chicago Portage, has been filled in; a triangular intrusion into the north bank at Damen Avenue marks the place where it diverged from the course of the canal. From there, the water flows down the canal through the southwest side of Chicago and southwestern suburbs and, in time, into the Des Plaines River between Crest Hill on the west and Lockport on the east, just north of the border between Crest Hill and Joliet, Illinois, eventually reaching the Gulf of Mexico.

=== Discharge ===
The United States Geological Survey monitors water flow at a number of sites in the Chicago River system. Discharge from the North Branch is measured at Grand Avenue; between 2004 and 2010 this averaged 582 cubic feet (16.5 m^{3}) per second. During the winter months as much as 75% of the flow in the North Branch is due to the discharge of treated sewage from the North Side Water Reclamation Plant into the North Shore Channel. Flow on the main stem is measured at Columbus Drive; between 2000 and 2006 this averaged 136 cubic feet (3.9 m^{3}) per second.

== History ==
=== Name ===
The name Chicago derives from the 17th century French rendering of shikaakwa or chicagou, the Native American name for ramps (Allium tricoccum), a type of edible wild leek, which grew abundantly near the river. The river, and its region, were named after the plant.

=== Exploration and settlement ===
Louis Jolliet and Jacques Marquette, though probably not the first Europeans to visit the area, are the first recorded to have visited the Chicago River in 1673, when they wrote of their discovery of the geographically vital Chicago Portage. Marquette returned in 1674, camped a few days near the mouth of the river, then moved on to the Chicago River–Des Plaines River portage, where he stayed through the winter of 1674–75. The Fox Wars effectively closed the Chicago area to Europeans in the first part of the 18th century. The first non-native to re-settle in the area may have been a trader named Guillory, who might have had a trading post near Wolf Point on the Chicago River in around 1778. In 1823 a government expedition used the name Gary River (phonetic spelling of Guillory) to refer to the north branch of the Chicago River.

Jean Baptiste Point du Sable is widely regarded as the first permanent resident of Chicago; he built a farm on the northern bank at the mouth of the river in the 1780s. The earliest known record of Pointe du Sable living in Chicago is the diary of Hugh Heward, who made a journey through Illinois in the spring of 1790. Antoine Ouilmette claimed to have arrived in Chicago shortly after this in July 1790.

In 1795, in a then minor part of the Treaty of Greenville, an Indian confederation granted treaty rights to the United States, to a parcel of land at the mouth of the "Chicago River". (Note: Six square miles centered at the mouth of the Chicago River. See Article 3 item 14 within the text of the treaty.) This was followed by the 1816 Treaty of St. Louis and Treaty of Chicago, which ceded additional land in the Chicago area. In 1803, Fort Dearborn was constructed on the bank opposite what had been Point du Sable's settlement, on the site of the present-day Michigan Avenue Bridge. Lieutenant James Strode Swearingen, who led the troops from Detroit to Chicago to establish the fort, described the river as being about 30 yards (27 m) wide and upwards of 18 feet (5.5 m) deep at the place where the fort was intended to be built; the riverbanks were 8 feet (2.4 m) high on the south side and 6 feet (1.8 m) on the north.

=== Early modifications ===
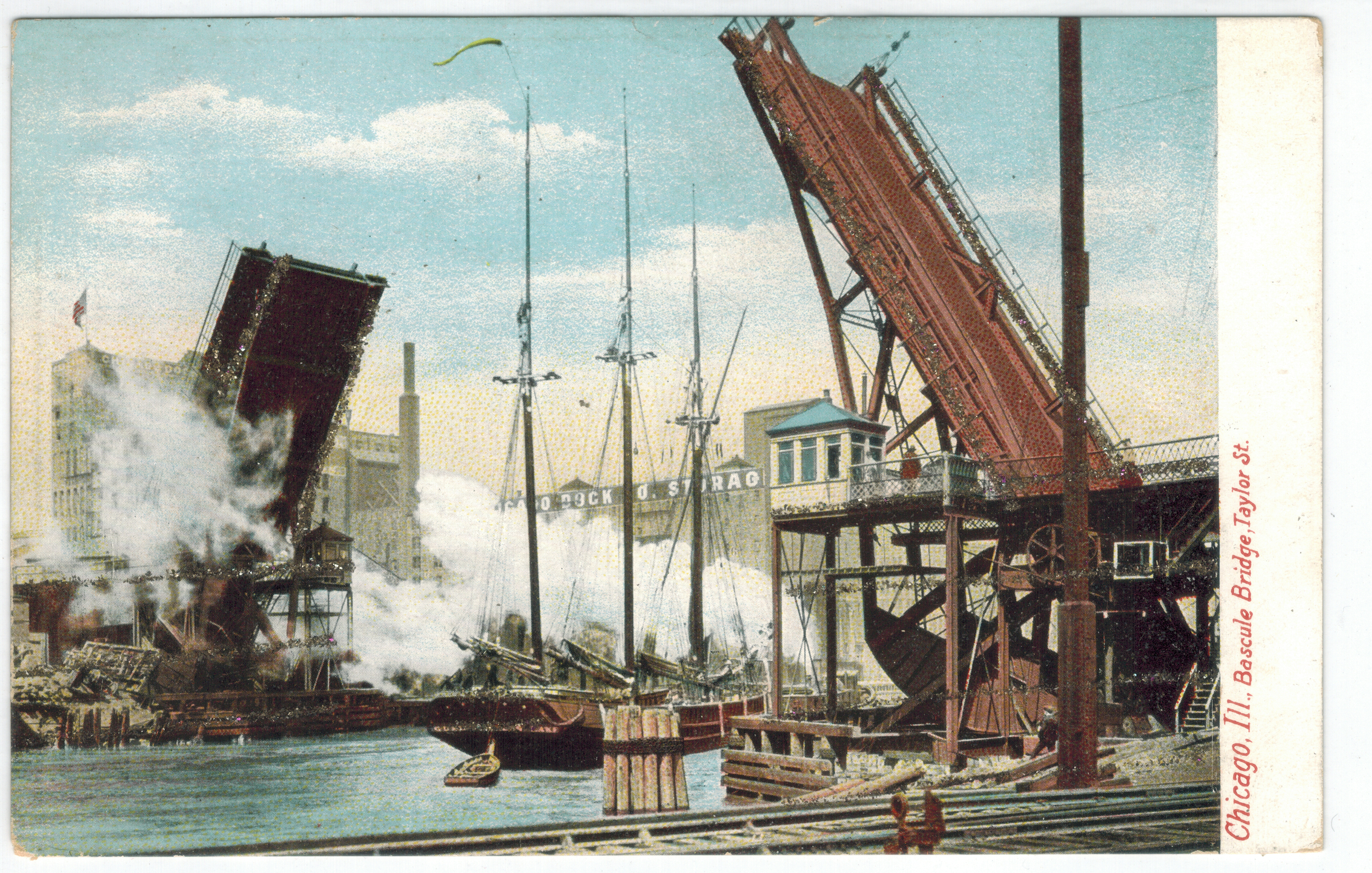
Taylor Street Bridge Circa 1919

Between 1816 and 1828 soldiers from Fort Dearborn cut channels through the sandbar at the mouth of the river to allow yawls to bring supplies to the fort. These channels rapidly clogged with sand requiring a new one to be cut. On March 2, 1833, $25,000 (Note: equivalent to $890,000 in 2025) was appropriated by Congress for harbor works, and work began in June of that year under the supervision of Major George Bender, the commandant at Fort Dearborn. In January 1834 James Allen took over the supervision of this work and, aided by a February storm that breached the sandbar, on July 12, 1834, the harbor works had progressed enough to allow a 100-short-ton (91 t) schooner, the Illinois to sail up the river to Wolf Point and dock at the wharf of Newberry & Dole. The initial entrance through the sandbar was 200 feet (61 m) wide and 3 to 7 feet (0.91 to 2.13 m) deep, flanked by piers 200 feet (61 m) long on the south wall and 700 feet (210 m) long to the north. Allen's work continued, and by October 1837 the still unfinished piers had been extended to 1,850 and 1,200 feet (560 and 370 m) respectively.

In 1848, the Illinois and Michigan Canal linked the river to the Illinois River and the Mississippi Valley across the Chicago Portage. This canal was the farthest west, and the last, of a series of United States' government land grant canals. It provided the only water route from New York City to New Orleans through the country's interior and Chicago.

=== Reversing the flow ===

During the last ice age, the area that became Chicago was covered by Lake Chicago, which drained south into the Mississippi Valley. As the ice and water retreated, a short 12-to-14-foot (3.7 to 4.3 m) ridge was exposed about a mile inland, which generally separated the Great Lakes' watershed from the Mississippi Valley, except in times of heavy precipitation or when winter ice flows prevented drainage. By the time Europeans arrived, the Chicago River flowed sluggishly into Lake Michigan from Chicago's flat plain. As Chicago grew, this allowed sewage and other pollution into the clean-water source for the city, contributing to several public health problems, like typhoid fever. Starting in 1848, much of the Chicago River's flow was also diverted across the Chicago Portage into the Illinois and Michigan Canal. In 1871, the old canal was deepened in an attempt to completely reverse the river's flow but the reversal of the river only lasted one season.

Finally, in 1900, the Sanitary District of Chicago, then headed by William Boldenweck, completely reversed the flow of the main stem and South Branch of the river using a series of canal locks, increasing the river's flow from Lake Michigan and causing it to empty into the newly completed Chicago Sanitary and Ship Canal. In 1999, this system was named a "Civil Engineering Monument of the Millennium" by the American Society of Civil Engineers (ASCE). Before this time, the Chicago River was known by many local residents of Chicago as "the stinking river" because of the massive amounts of sewage and pollution that poured into the river from Chicago's booming industrial economy.

Through the 1980s, the river was quite dirty and often filled with garbage; however, during the 1990s, it underwent extensive cleaning as part of an effort at beautification by Chicago Mayor Richard M. Daley.

In 2005, researchers at the University of Illinois at Urbana–Champaign created a three-dimensional, hydrodynamic simulation of the Chicago River, which suggested that density currents are the cause of an observed bi-directional wintertime flow in the river. At the surface, the river flows east to west, away from Lake Michigan, as expected. But deep below, near the riverbed, water seasonally travels west to east, toward the lake.

All outflows from the Great Lakes Basin are regulated by the joint U.S.-Canadian Great Lakes Commission, and the outflow through the Chicago River is set under a U.S. Supreme Court decision (1967, modified 1980 and 1997). The city of Chicago is allowed to remove 3,200 cubic feet per second (91 m^{3}/s) of water from the Great Lakes system; about half of this, 1 billion US gallons per day (44 m^{3}/s), is sent down the Chicago River, while the rest is used for drinking water. In late 2005, the Chicago-based Alliance for the Great Lakes proposed re-separating the Great Lakes and Mississippi River basins to address such ecological concerns as the spread of invasive species.

=== Eastland disaster ===
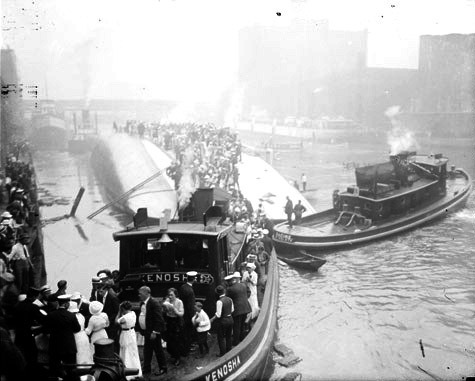
Passengers being rescued from the hull of the Eastland by the tugboat Kenosha in the Chicago River

In 1915, the SS Eastland, an excursion steam-liner preparing to leave the dock on the south gangway between the Clark Street Bridge and La Salle Street Bridge, rolled over, killing 844 of the more than 2500 passengers. The roll of the heavy steamer happened very quickly and many of the passengers were trapped under water by the hull, moving objects such as pianos and tables, the crush of bodies, or their heavy clothes. Frantic if disordered rescue attempts ensued and early versions of what may be regarded as trauma teams formed to address the shocking scene. The site on the south bank at the southeast end of the La Salle Street Bridge is now the location of a memorial first dedicated in 1989.

=== Chicago flood of 1992 ===
On April 13, 1992, a flood occurred when a pile driven into the riverbed caused stress fractures in the wall of a long-abandoned tunnel of the Chicago Tunnel Company near the Kinzie Street railroad bridge (not to be confused with the Kinzie Street Bridge). Most of the 60-mile (97 km) network of underground freight railway, which encompasses much of downtown, was eventually flooded, along with the lower levels of buildings it once serviced and attached underground shops and pedestrian ways, and later drained.

=== Bridges ===
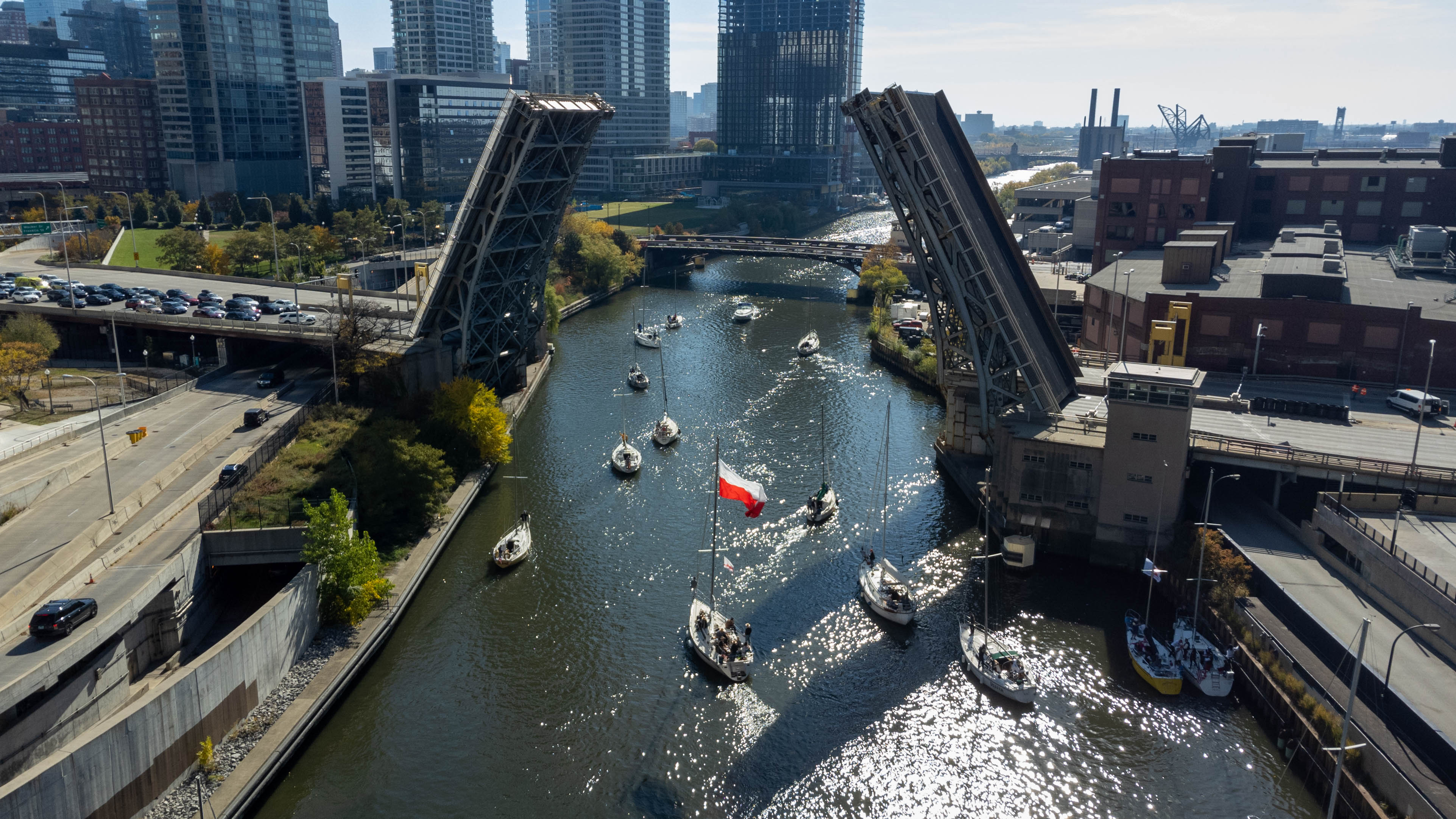
Ida B Wells Blvd Bridge raised to allow sailboats with tall masts to pass

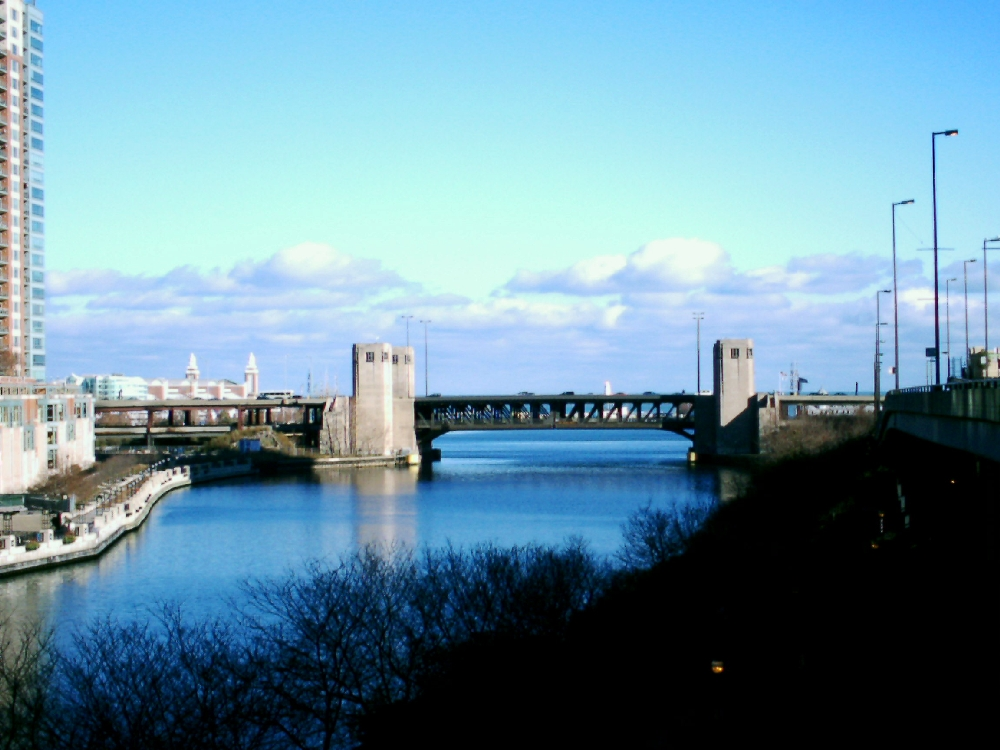
The Link Bridge of DuSable Lake Shore Drive near Lake Michigan

The first bridge across the Chicago River was constructed over the North Branch near the present day Kinzie Street in 1832. A second bridge, over the South Branch near Randolph Street, was added in 1833. The first moveable bridge was constructed across the main stem at Dearborn Street in 1834. Today, the Chicago River has 38 movable bridges spanning it, down from a peak of 52 bridges. These bridges are of several different types, including trunnion bascule, Scherzer rolling lift, swing bridges, and vertical-lift bridges.

== Pollution ==
The Chicago River has been highly affected by industrial and residential development with attendant changes to the quality of the water and riverbanks. Several species of freshwater fish are known to inhabit the river, including largemouth and smallmouth bass, rock bass, crappie, bluegill, catfish, and carp. The river also has a large population of crayfish. The South Fork of the Main (South) Branch, which was the primary sewer for the Union Stock Yards and the meat packing industry, was once so polluted that it became known as Bubbly Creek. Illinois has issued advisories regarding eating fish from the river due to PCB and mercury contamination, including a "do not eat" advisory for carp more than 12 inches long. There are concerns that silver carp and bighead carp, now invasive species in the Mississippi and Illinois Rivers, may reach the Great Lakes through the Chicago River. A program on the north channel next to Goose Island seeks to increase wildlife habitat through the use of floating plant islands. The program is managed by the non-profit conservation group Urban Rivers with assistance from the Shedd Aquarium. As with some other bodies of water in the United States, the river has seen several successful efforts to improve water quality since the passage of the Clean Water Act of 1972 and related state and local efforts.

== Recreation ==
=== Fishing ===
Despite the pollution concerns, the Chicago River remains a very popular target for freshwater recreational fishing. In 2006, the Chicago Park District started the annual "Mayor Daley's Chicago River Fishing Festival", which has increased in popularity with each year. Between 2013 and 2016, the Chicago Park District opened four boat houses, two on the south branch and two on the north, for river recreation.

=== Swimming ===
In general, the Chicago River is not open to the public for swimming. But since 2025, the city has hosted swim events in the Chicago River. Prior to 2025, open swim events had not occurred in the Chicago River since 1926.

== Mouth of the river ==
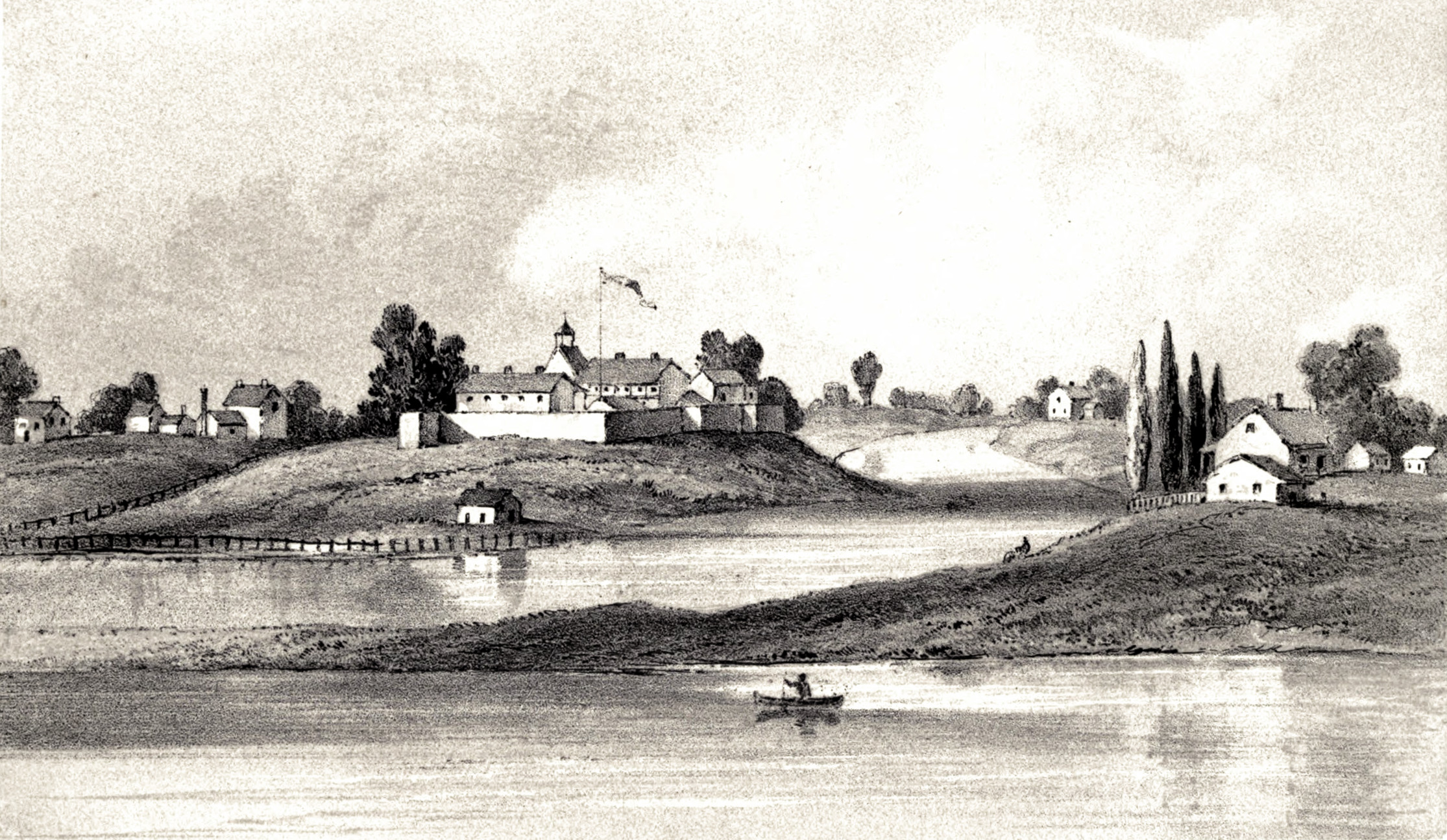
Near the mouth of the Chicago River 1831

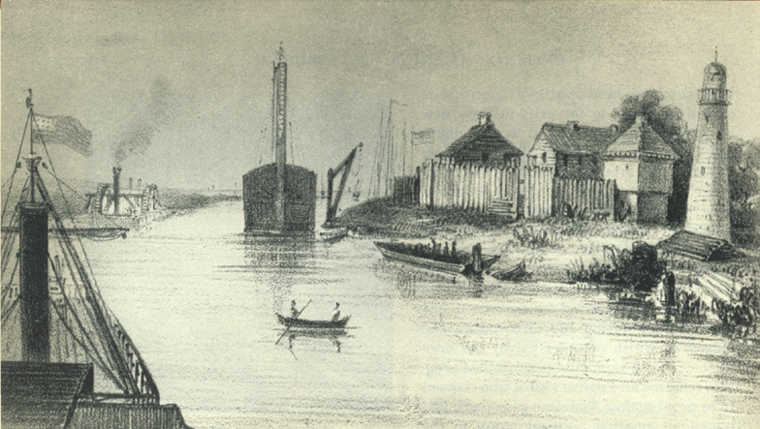
Near the mouth of the Chicago River 1838

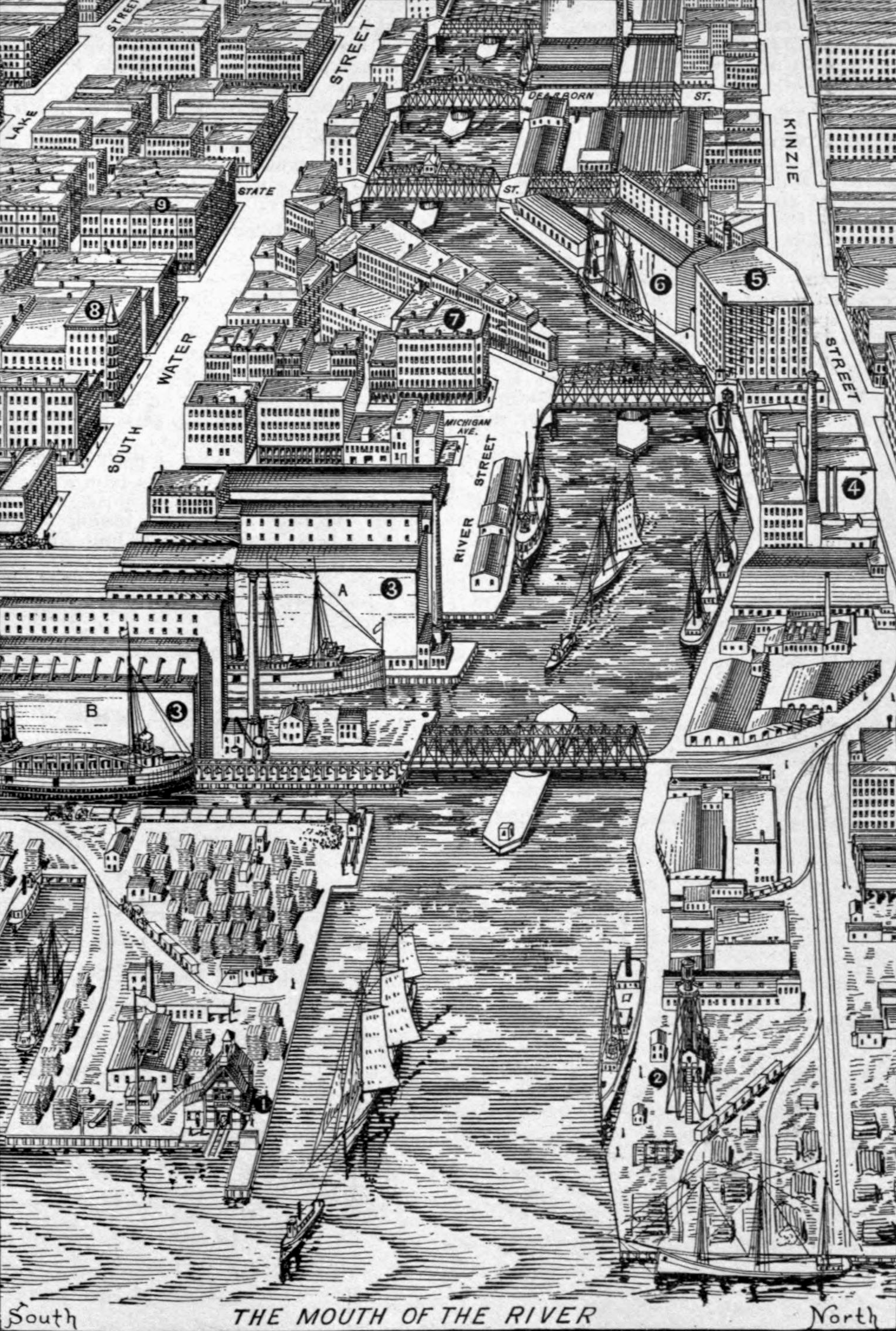
Near the mouth of the Chicago River 1893

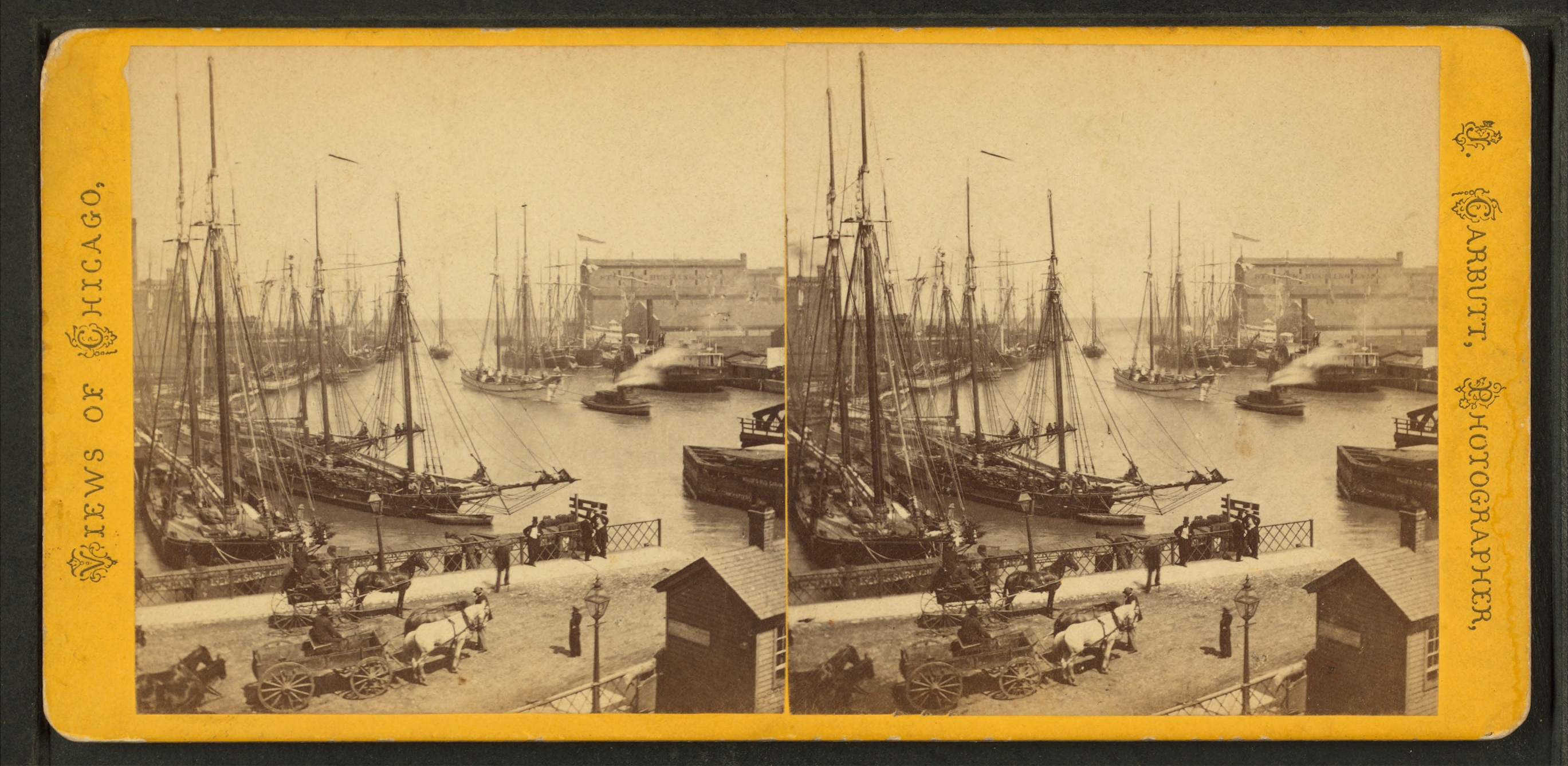
Near the mouth of the Chicago River c. late 1800s

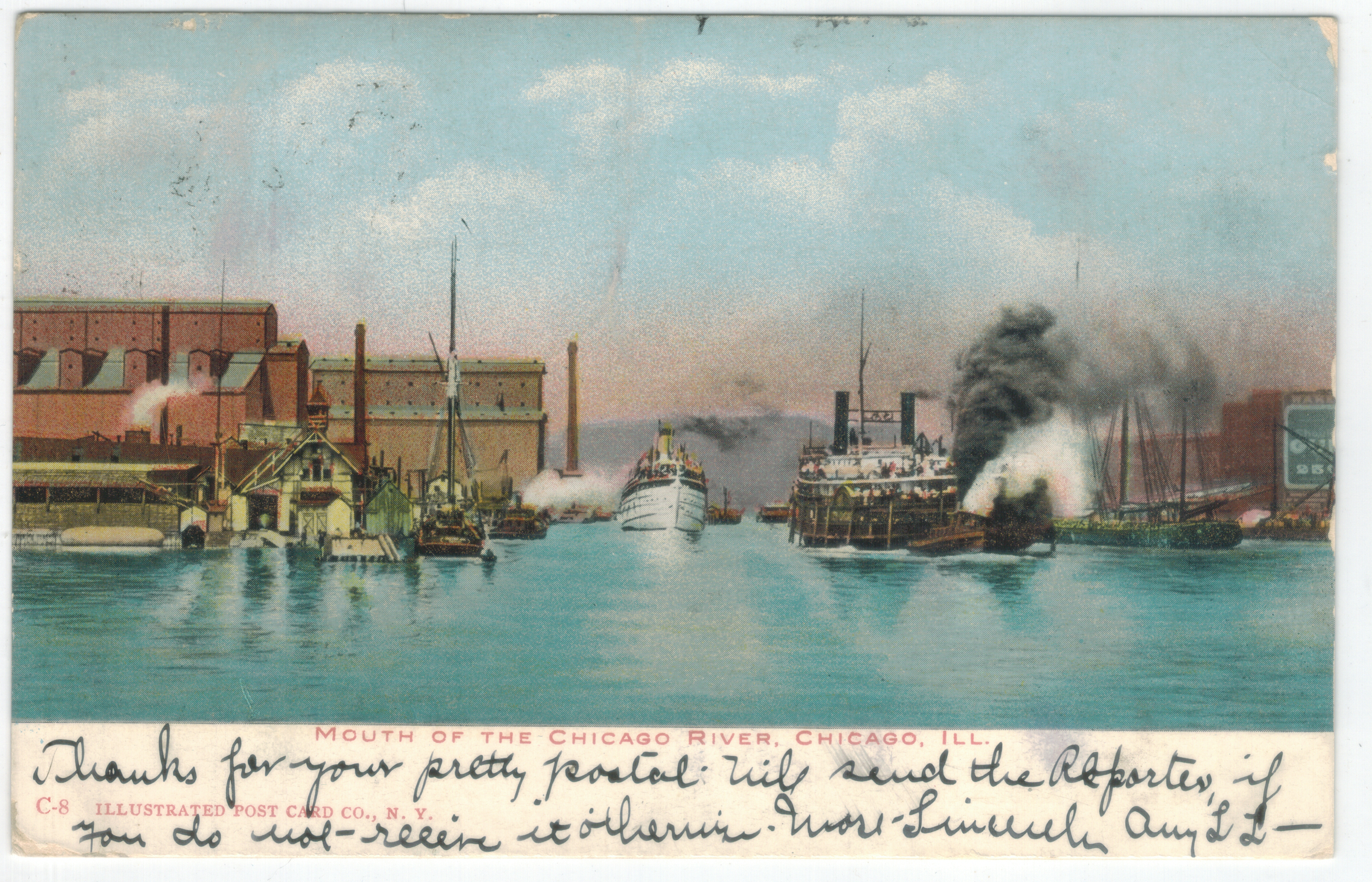
Mouth of the river in the early 20th century

== Dyeing the river ==
=== Saint Patrick's Day ===
The Chicago River dyed green for Saint Patrick's Day

As part of a more than sixty-year-old Chicago tradition, the Chicago River is dyed green in observance of Saint Patrick's Day. Cook County, of which Chicago is the county seat, had the highest number of Irish Americans by county in the United States according to 2023 census data. The event occurs on the Saturday on or before March 17, when large celebratory crowds gather to watch the dyeing of the river, and then many go downtown to attend one of the holiday parades.

The tradition of dyeing the river green arose by accident in 1961 when plumbers were using fluorescein dye to trace sources of illegal pollution discharge into the river. The plumbers then proposed a continuing celebration to the administration of the city's Irish-American mayor Richard J. Daley. The dyeing of the river is still sponsored by the local plumbers union. Environmental concerns disallowed the use of fluorescein for this purpose, since it was shown to be harmful to the river. The parade committee switched to a mix involving forty pounds of powdered vegetable dye. Though the committee closely guards the exact formula, they insist that it has been tested and verified safe for the environment.

The environmental organization Friends of the Chicago River disapproves of dyeing the river, saying the practice "gives the impression that it is lifeless and artificial", adding "Friends doesn't think that the river should be treated as a decoration for an annual holiday, but treasured and cared for as the wonderful natural and recreational resource it deserves to be".

In 2009, First Lady Michelle Obama, a Chicago native, inspired by the river tradition, requested that the water in the White House fountains be dyed green to celebrate Saint Patrick's Day.

=== Chicago Cubs rally ===
For the Chicago Cubs rally and parade for their 2016 World Series Championship celebrations, the river was dyed Cubs blue. Friends of the Chicago River executive director Margaret Frisbie told the Chicago Sun-Times, "We do not want to set a precedent where, every time we want to celebrate, we dye the river a different color and potentially hurt the aquatic life that lives in it. While it may seem festive, it's actually potentially harming a natural resource."

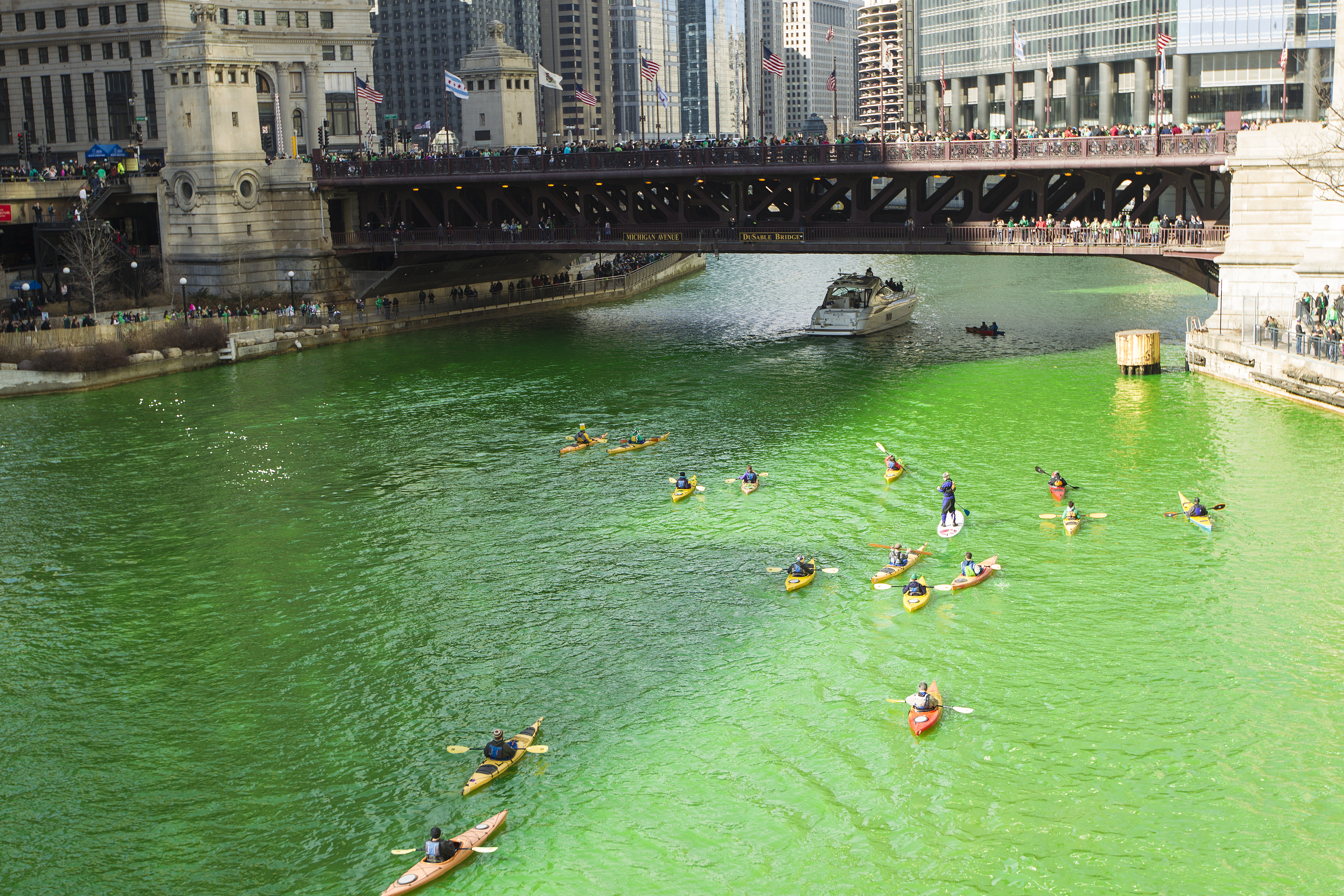
The river dyed green for Saint Patrick's Day in 2015

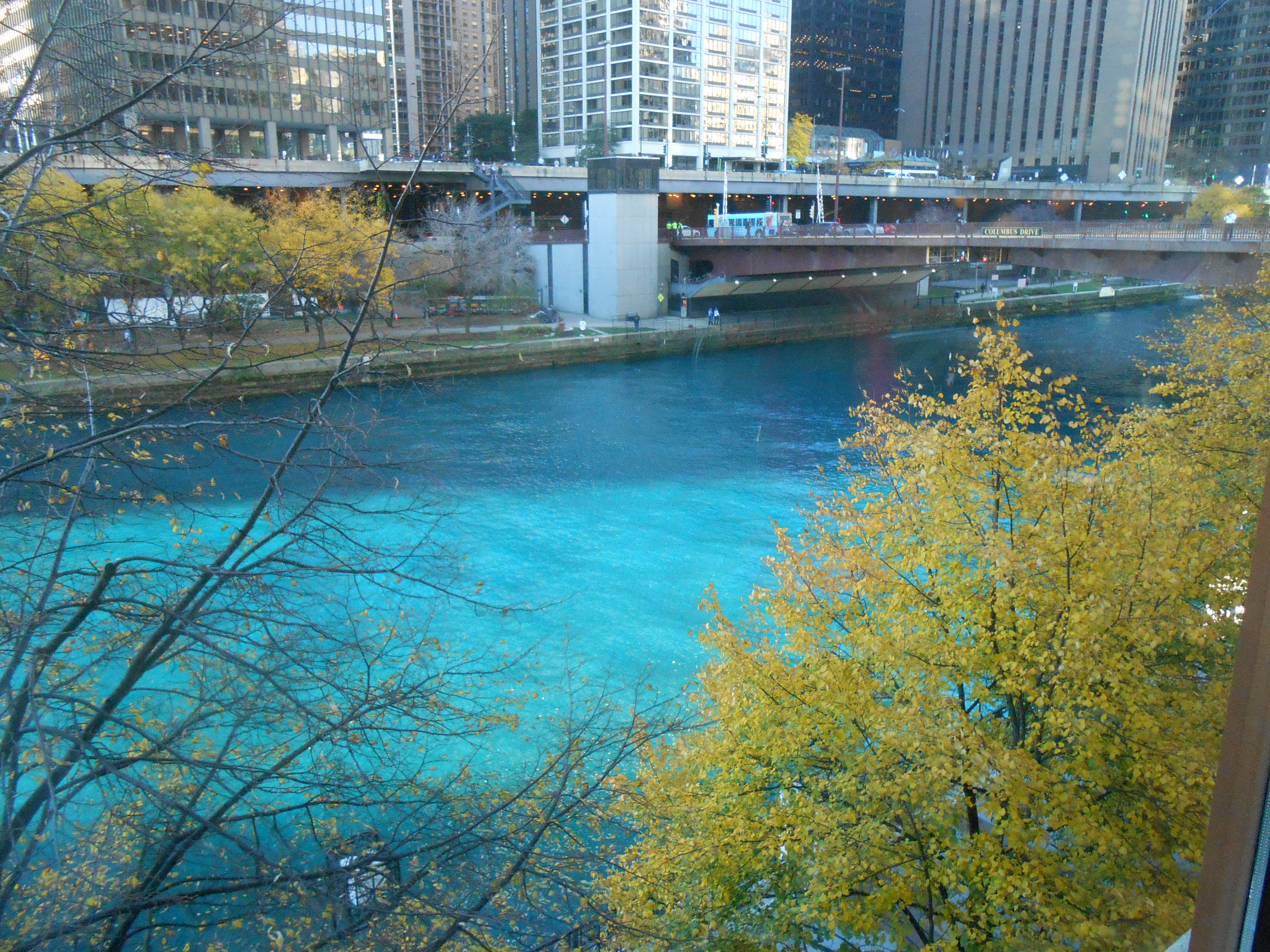
The river dyed blue during the Chicago Cubs' 2016 World Series celebration

== McCormick Bridgehouse and Chicago River Museum ==
The southwest bridgehouse of the DuSable Bridge (Michigan Avenue) serves as a museum on the river, its history, its challenges, and its renaissance. The McCormick Bridgehouse & Chicago River Museum is a 5-floor, 1,613-square-foot (149.9 m^{2}) museum that opened on June 10, 2006; it is named for Robert R. McCormick, formerly owner of the Chicago Tribune and president of the Chicago Sanitary District. The Robert R. McCormick Foundation was the major donor that helped meet the $950,000 cost to open the museum. It is run by the Friends of the Chicago River, a non-profit environmental organization. Visitors are also allowed to access the bridge's gear room; during the spring and fall bridge lifting visitors can see the bridge gears in operation as the leaves are raised and lowered. Due to its small size and tight access stairway only 79 people are allowed inside the museum at any one time. In October 2019, Chicago Tribune cultural arts writer Steve Johnson profiled the museum, calling its gear room where the DuSable Bridge mechanics can be viewed "a little chamber of heaven for infrastructure nerds".

== Monitoring the impact of extreme weather events on the Chicago District ==
The US Army Corps of Engineers have monitored the development of harbors and channels for navigation on the Great Lakes since the early 1800s. They began monitoring hydrological conditions and lake levels in 1918. A December 26, 2012 report revealed that Chicago District navigation infrastructure did receive significant impacts from Hurricane Sandy with some areas experiencing severe shoaling. Chicago Shoreline Project mitigated the damage of the storm event.

The same report noted that the low Great Lakes levels were drought-induced, caused by a very hot, dry summer and a lack of a solid snowpack in the winter of 2012. At the time of the report, December 2012, Lake Michigan-Huron was 28 inches below its long-term average which is near the record lows of 1964. Historic lake levels for Lake Michigan reported from 1918 to 1998 show that the low levels observed in 1964 were the lowest since 1918. In 2012 Lake Michigan-Huron's seasonal rise was about 4 inches where it usually is about 12 inches. Normally the Chicago River water level is two feet lower than the lake and therefore does not flow into the lake. If the lake level falls too low threatening to reverse the river flow, the Metropolitan Water Reclamation District of Greater Chicago would be forced to close locks between the lake and river for longer periods of time, limiting navigation. A reversal flow of the Chicago River into Lake Michigan would have a negative impact on navigation and on the quality of Lake Michigan water, which is the source of drinking water. Chicago's raw sewage in the river is normally carried upstream toward the Mississippi River which flows south towards the Gulf of Mexico. On January 9, 2013, Chicago meteorologists announced 320 days without at least one inch of snowfall. Water levels in the lake started to level off with the river and sewage was visible at the cusp of the locks, just a few hundred feet from Lake Michigan. David St. Pierre, executive director of the Metropolitan Water Reclamation District of Greater Chicago warned the low lake levels were nearing a point of real concern. However, the District maintains that it is not possible for the river to reverse due to low lake level alone.

Measurements taken by the US Army Corps of Engineers in January 2013 revealed that both Lake Michigan and Lake Huron had reached their "lowest ebb since record keeping began in 1918, and the lakes could set additional records over the next few months, the corps said. The lakes were 74 centimetres (29 inches) below their long-term average and had declined 43 centimetres (17 inches) since January 2012".

== See also ==
- Bubbly Creek
- Centennial Fountain
- Ogden Slip
- Illinois Department of Transportation
- List of bridges documented by the Historic American Engineering Record in Illinois
- List of rivers of Illinois
