= Wells Street Bridge (Chicago) =

Bridge in Chicago, Illinois, U.S.

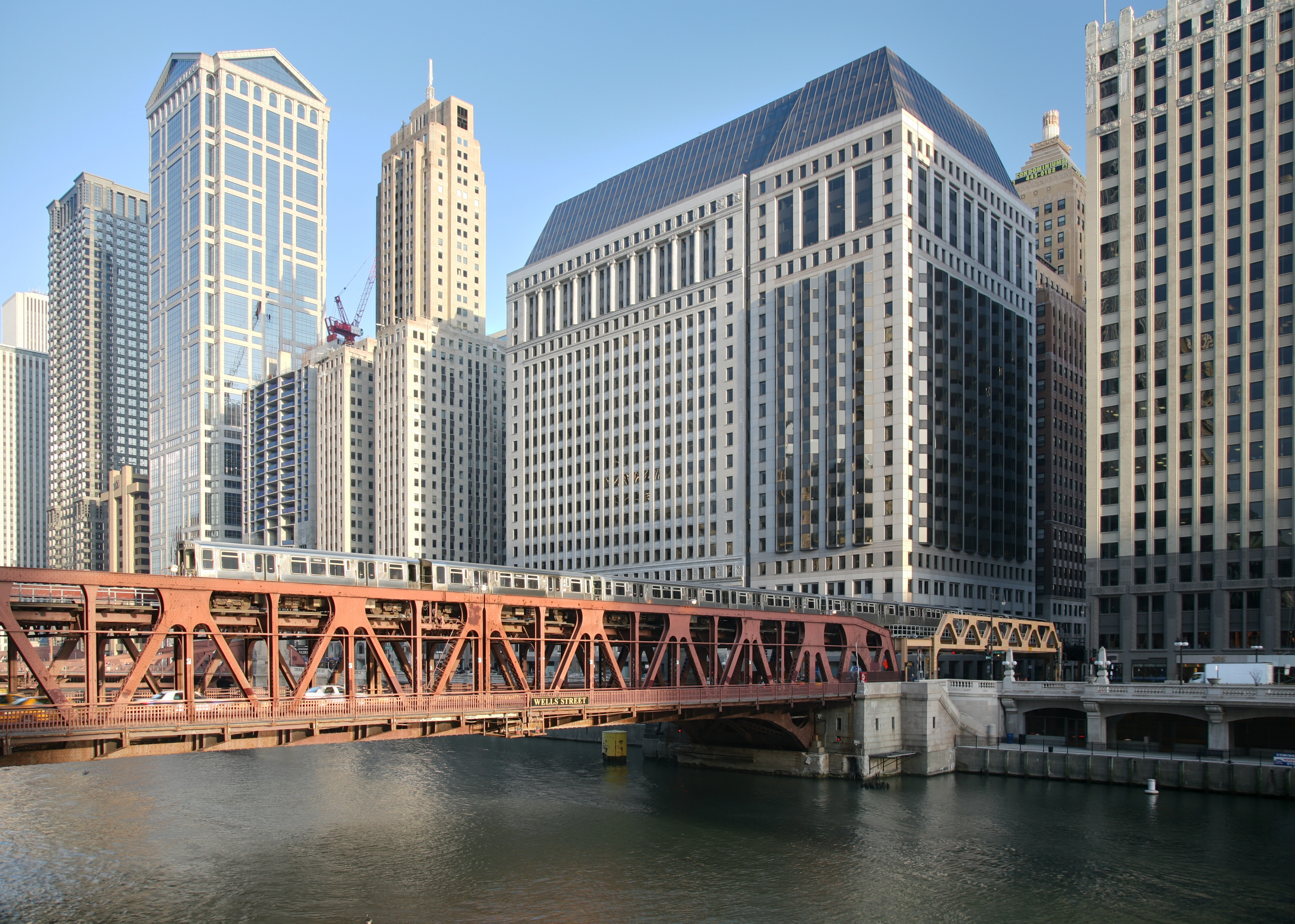
- The bridge carrying a Chicago Transit Authority Chicago 'L' train in 2009
- Coordinates: 41°53′15″N 87°38′02″W
- Carries: Automobiles; Brown Purple; Pedestrians
- Crosses: Chicago River
- Locale: Chicago, Cook County, Illinois
- Official name: Wells Street Bridge

Characteristics
- Design: Double-deck, double-leaf bascule bridge
- Total length: 231 feet
- Width: 72 feet
- Longest span: 268 feet
- Clearance above: 16 feet

Rail characteristics
- No. of tracks: 2
- Track gauge: 4 ft 8 1/2 in (1,435 mm) standard gauge
- Electrified: Third rail, 600 V DC

History
- Designer: E. H. Bennett
- Opened: February 11, 1922
- Rebuilt: 2012-2013

The Wells Street Bridge is a bascule bridge over the Chicago River, in downtown Chicago, Illinois, United States, which was built in 1922. Standing east of the Franklin Street Bridge and southeast of the Merchandise Mart, the bridge connects the Near North Side with "The Loop". The bridge is double-decked, the lower deck carrying three lanes of traffic south over the river with sidewalks on both sides of the street. The upper deck serves as a bridge for the Chicago Transit Authority's Brown and Purple lines. Bridge tenders' houses for controlling the bridge are on the northwest and southeast corners of the bridge.

== History ==
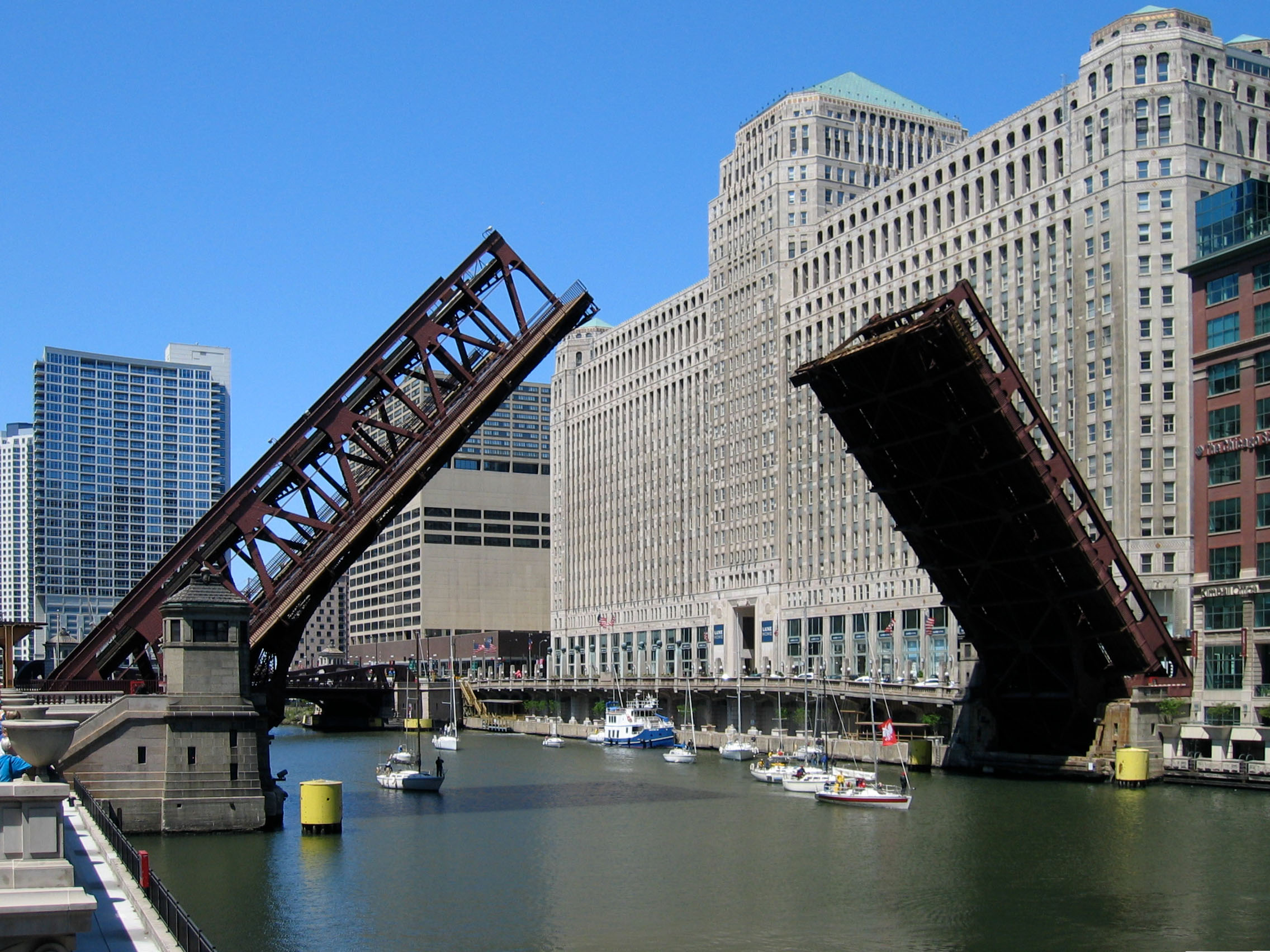
The bridge raised to allow sailboats to pass in 2007

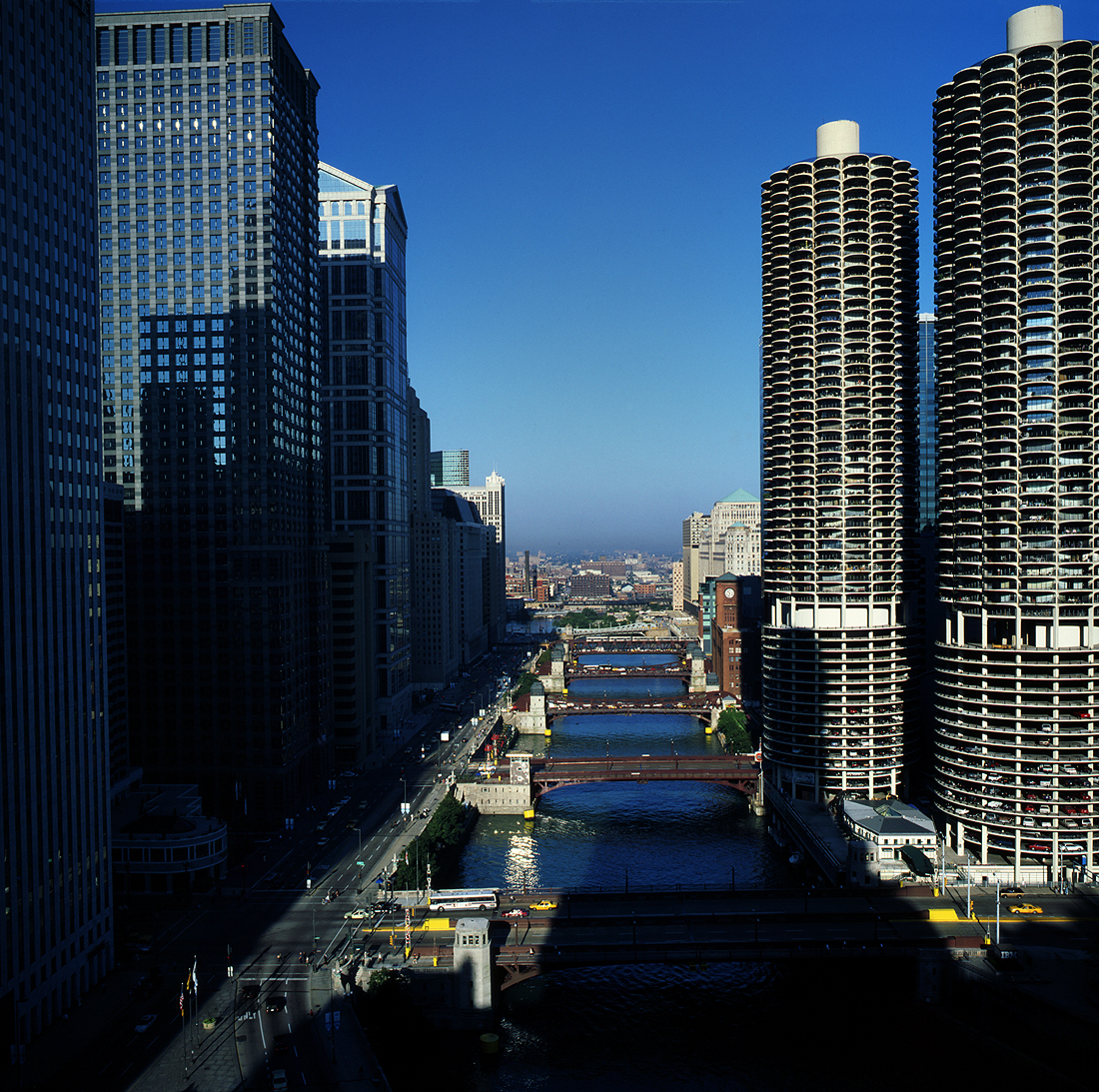
State Street Bridge (foreground), Dearborn Street Bridge, Clark Street Bridge, La Salle Street Bridge, Wells Street Bridge, and Franklin Street Bridge

The bridge was constructed during the first term of William Hale Thompson. The Chicago Plan Commission and Chicago Art Commission provided design input to architect E. H. Bennett.

The bridge was completely rebuilt 2012-2013 by the Chicago Department of Transportation. The two leaves (north and south) were built off-site and floated on the river to Wells Street for installation. The other half of the bridge was rebuilt in place – the two portions closest to each river bank, containing the counterweights for the bascule bridge.

The second period of the reconstruction that affects Chicago Transit Authority train service on the upper level began at 10 pm April 26, 2013 and ended before the morning rush hour Monday May 6, 2013. The north leaf of the bridge was installed in the nine-day period, again floating the section on the Chicago River from its construction site to the bridge. The bridge reopened fully on November 21, 2013, when the lower level of the bridge opened to vehicles, bicycles and pedestrians. The bridge tender houses are also part of the rehabilitation of the bridge.

== See also ==
- List of bridges documented by the Historic American Engineering Record in Illinois
