= Franklin Street Bridge =

Bridge in Chicago, Illinois, U.S.

Franklin–Orleans Street Bridge
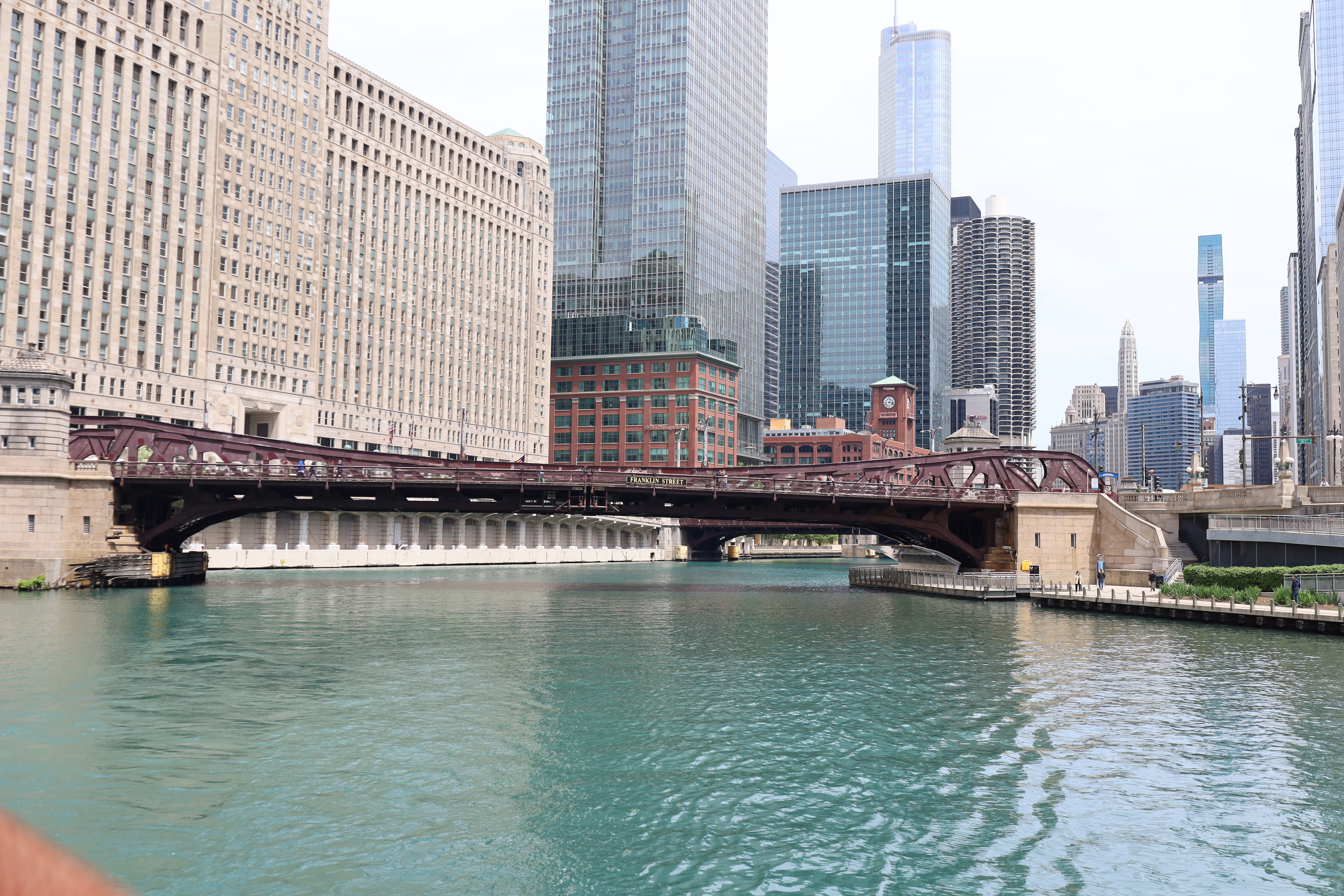
- The bridge in 2023
- Coordinates: 41°53′14″N 87°38′9″W
- Carries: Automobiles, Pedestrians
- Crosses: Chicago River
- Locale: Chicago, Cook County, Illinois
- Official name: Franklin–Orleans Street Bridge

Characteristics
- Design: Double-leaf bascule
- Total length: 320 feet (98 m; 57 sm)
- Width: 62 feet (19 m)
- Longest span: 220 feet (67 m)
- Clearance below: 18.7 feet (5.7 m)

History
- Constructed by: Great Lakes Dredge and Dock Company, Ketler–Elliot Company
- Opened: October 1920

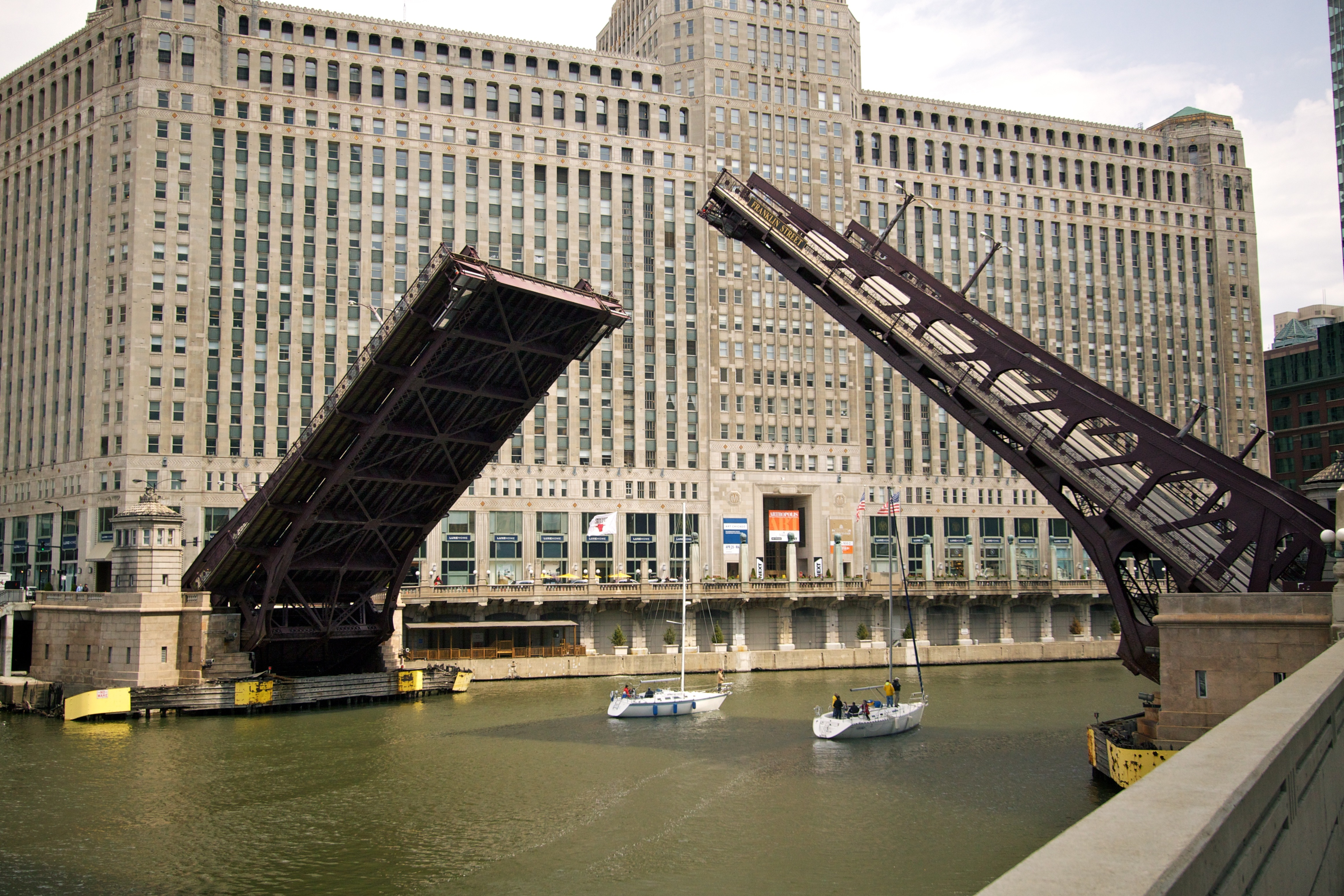
The bridge raised for sailboats in 2011

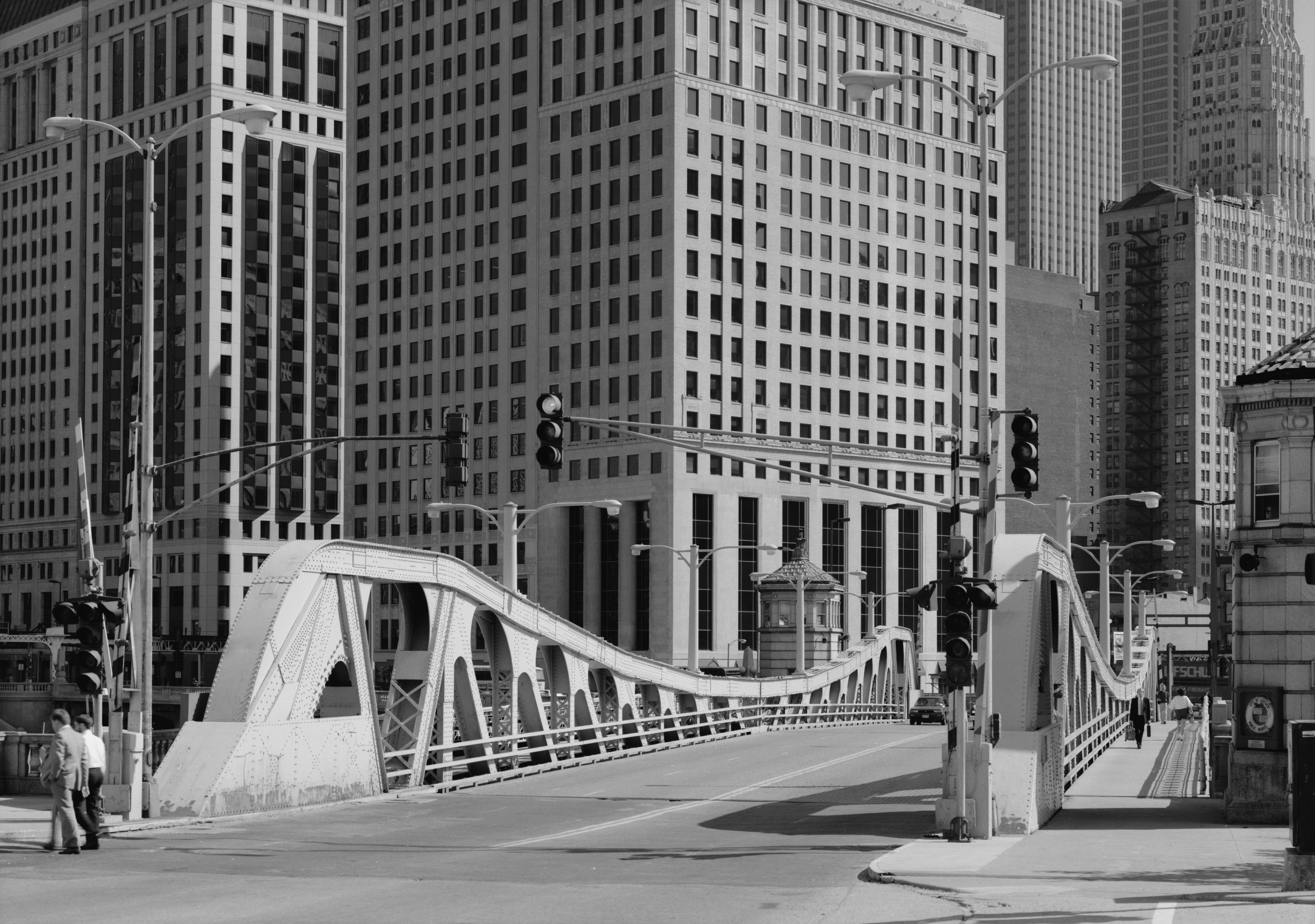
Deck of the bridge in 1987

The Franklin–Orleans Street Bridge, commonly known as the Franklin Street Bridge, is a bascule bridge over the Chicago River, in Chicago, Illinois, United States. It was built in October 1920, and is located directly southwest of the Merchandise Mart. Connecting the Near North Side with "The Loop," is at the junction of the branches of the river, lying directly west of the Wells Street Bridge. It carries four lanes of traffic in the northbound direction, and sidewalks are available on both sides of the bridge.

Great Lakes Dredge and Dock Company was the contractor for the substructure, and the Ketler–Elliot Company was the contractor for the superstructure. Original electrical equipment was installed by C. H. Norwood. The bridge is an example of a trunnion bascule bridge, with each half of the roadway is cantilevered out from shore abutments. The bridge is extremely efficient to operate.

The bridge provided a new connection to the southern banks of the river and aided in westward expansion along Wacker Drive.

== In popular culture ==
- The Franklin-Orleans Street Bridge was featured prominently in the 2005 film Batman Begins as the bridge that connects Gotham City with the Narrows.
- The Franklin-Orleans Street Bridge was also featured in the 2014 film Divergent

== See also ==
- List of bridges documented by the Historic American Engineering Record in Illinois
