= La Salle Street Bridge (Chicago) =

Bridge in Chicago, Illinois, U.S.

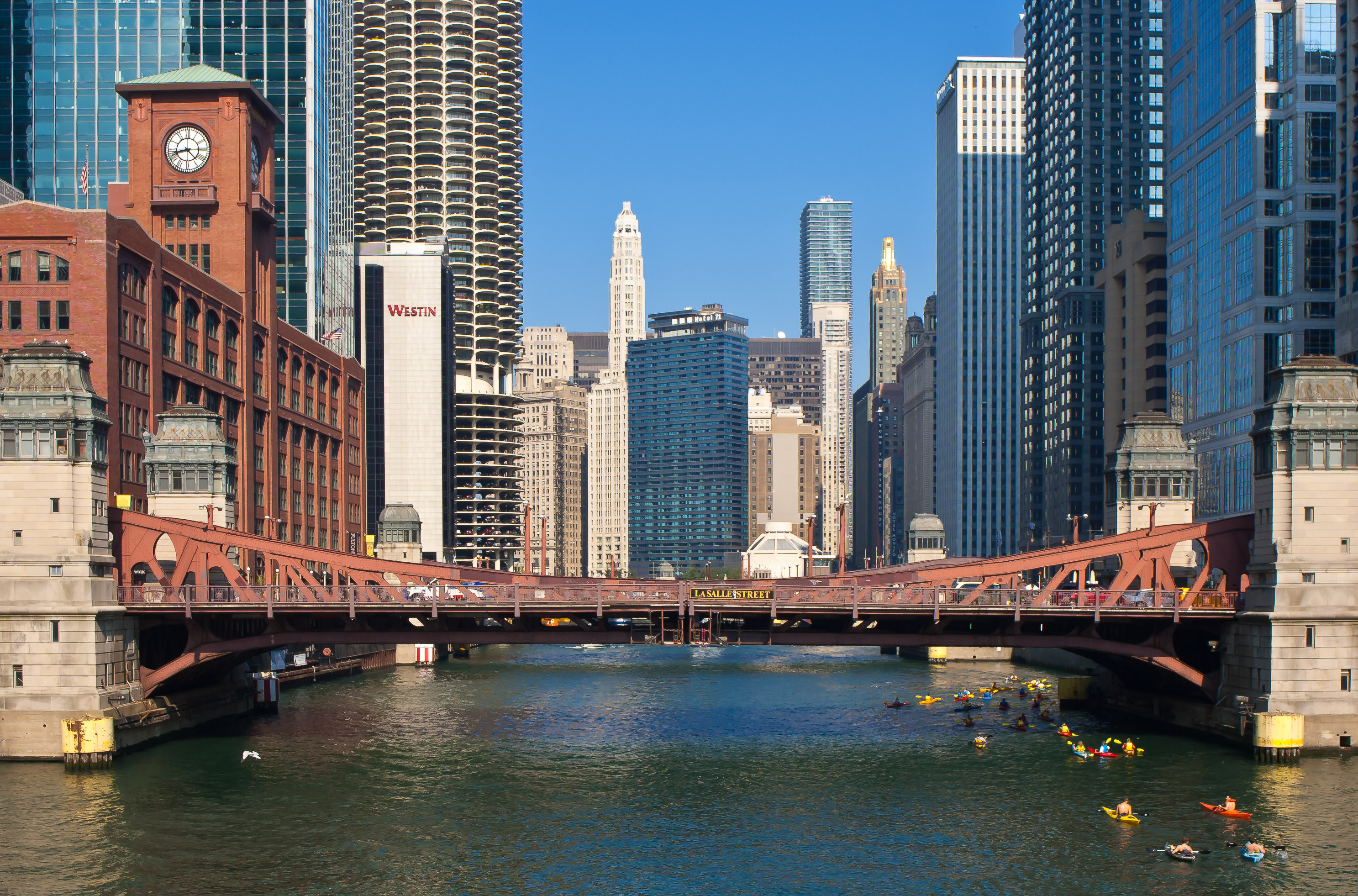
- View of the bridge from the Wells Street Bridge
- Coordinates: 41.887484°N 87.632474°W
- Carries: Automobiles; Pedestrians
- Crosses: Chicago River
- Locale: Chicago, Cook County, Illinois
- Official name: Marshall Suloway Bridge
- Maintained by: Chicago Department of Transportation
- ID number: 000016603226800

Characteristics
- Total length: 242 feet (74 m)
- Width: 86 feet (26 m)
- Longest span: 220 feet (67 m)
- Clearance above: 18.7 feet (5.7 m)

History
- Designer: Donald Becker
- Opened: 1928

Statistics
- Daily traffic: 12050

The La Salle Street Bridge (officially the Marshall Suloway Bridge) is a single-deck double-leaf trunnion bascule bridge spanning the main stem of the Chicago River in Chicago, Illinois, that connects the Near North Side with the Loop area. It was constructed in 1928 at a cost of $2,500,000 by the Strobel Steel Constructing Company.

The bridge was part of a scheme to widen LaSalle Street and improve access from the Loop to the north side of the river that had been proposed as early as 1902. The design of the bridge, along with those for new bridges at Madison Street, Franklin Street, and Clark Street, was approved in 1916.

The Chicago City Council renamed the bridge in 1999 to honor former Chicago Department of Public Works Commissioner Marshall Suloway.

== See also ==
- List of bridges documented by the Historic American Engineering Record in Illinois
