= Taylor Street Bridge (Chicago) =

Bridge in Chicago, Illinois, U.S.

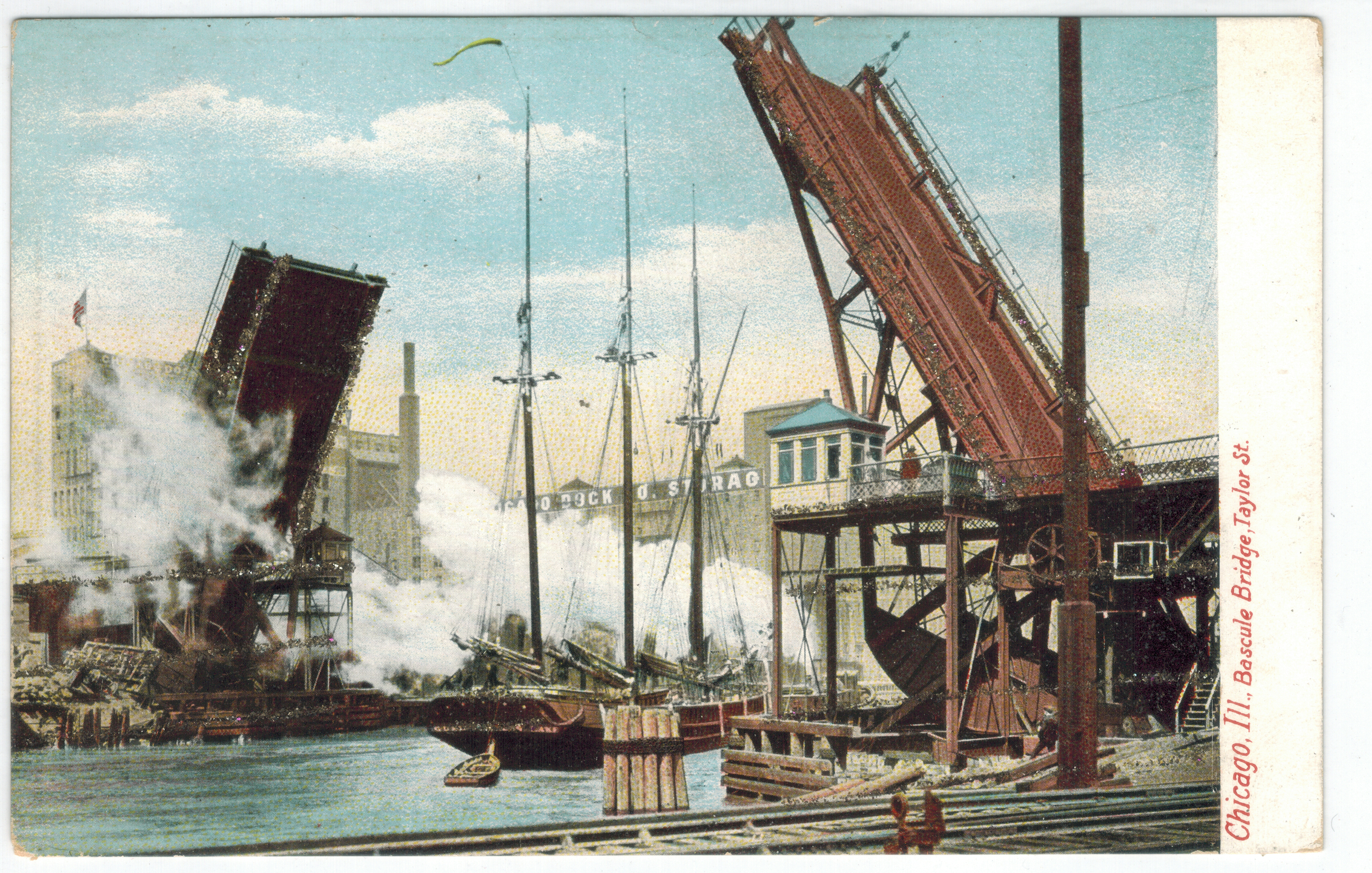
- The bridge c. 1919
- Coordinates: 41°52′11.2″N 87°38′6.2″W

The Taylor Street Bridge was the first Scherzer rolling lift bascule bridge built in Chicago, Illinois.

== History ==
The first iteration of the bridge was built in 1890; the swing bridge structure was reused from Adams Street Bridge, which was rebuilt at the time of the structure's relocation. Because the bridge reused an existing structure that was built thirty years prior, by the end of the decade, the bridge became deteriorated enough to warrant a new bridge. Not only that, the swing bridge's central pivot was an obstacle for river traffic. It was closed in 1899 in favor of the new Scherzer rolling lift bascule bridge, which opened in 1901. Due to the straightening of the South Branch Chicago River in the 1920s, the bridge was closed without a replacement in 1928.
