= Dearborn Street Bridge =

Bridge in Chicago, Illinois, U.S.

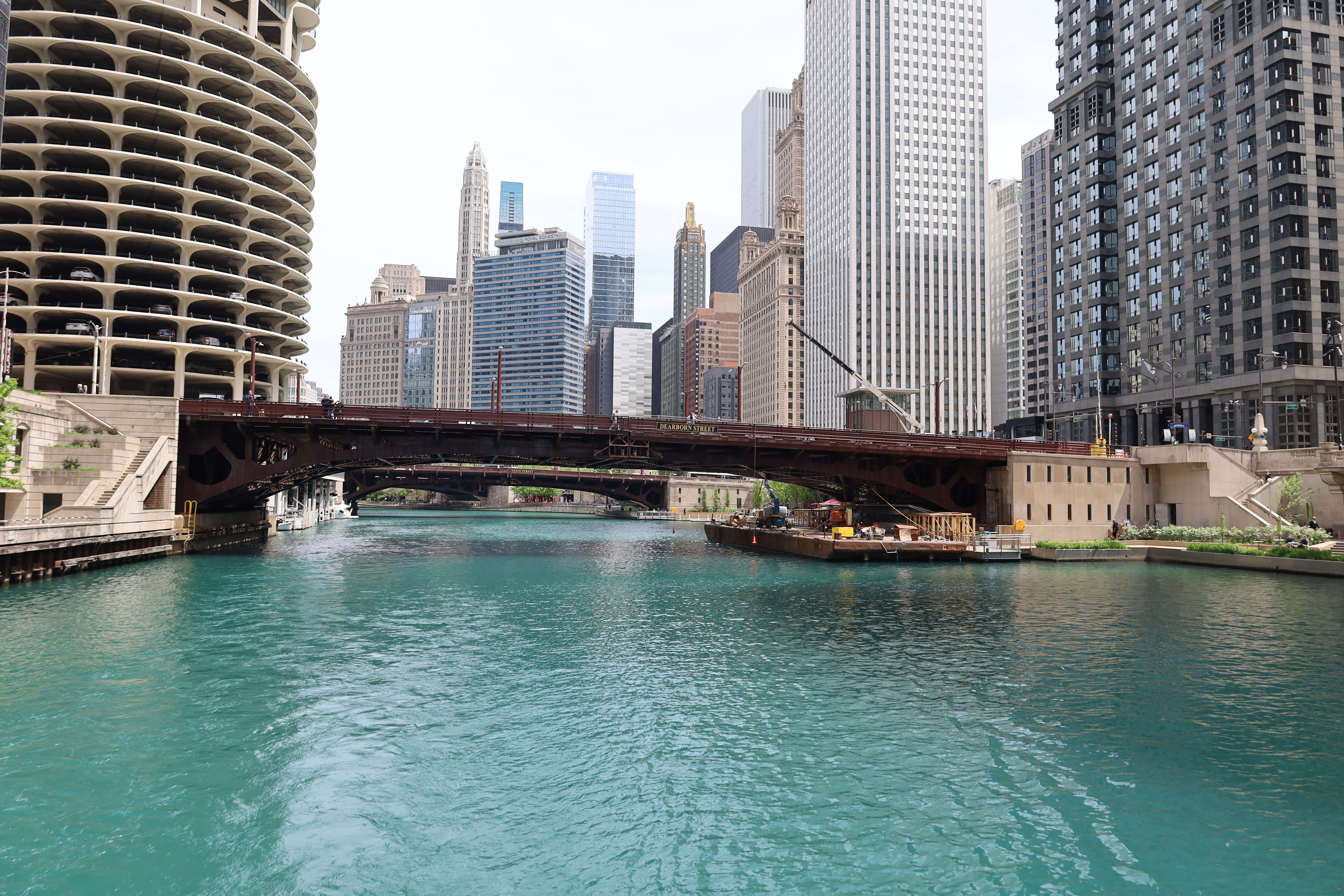
- The bridge in 2023
- Coordinates: 41°53′15″N 87°37′46″W

History
- Opened: 1962

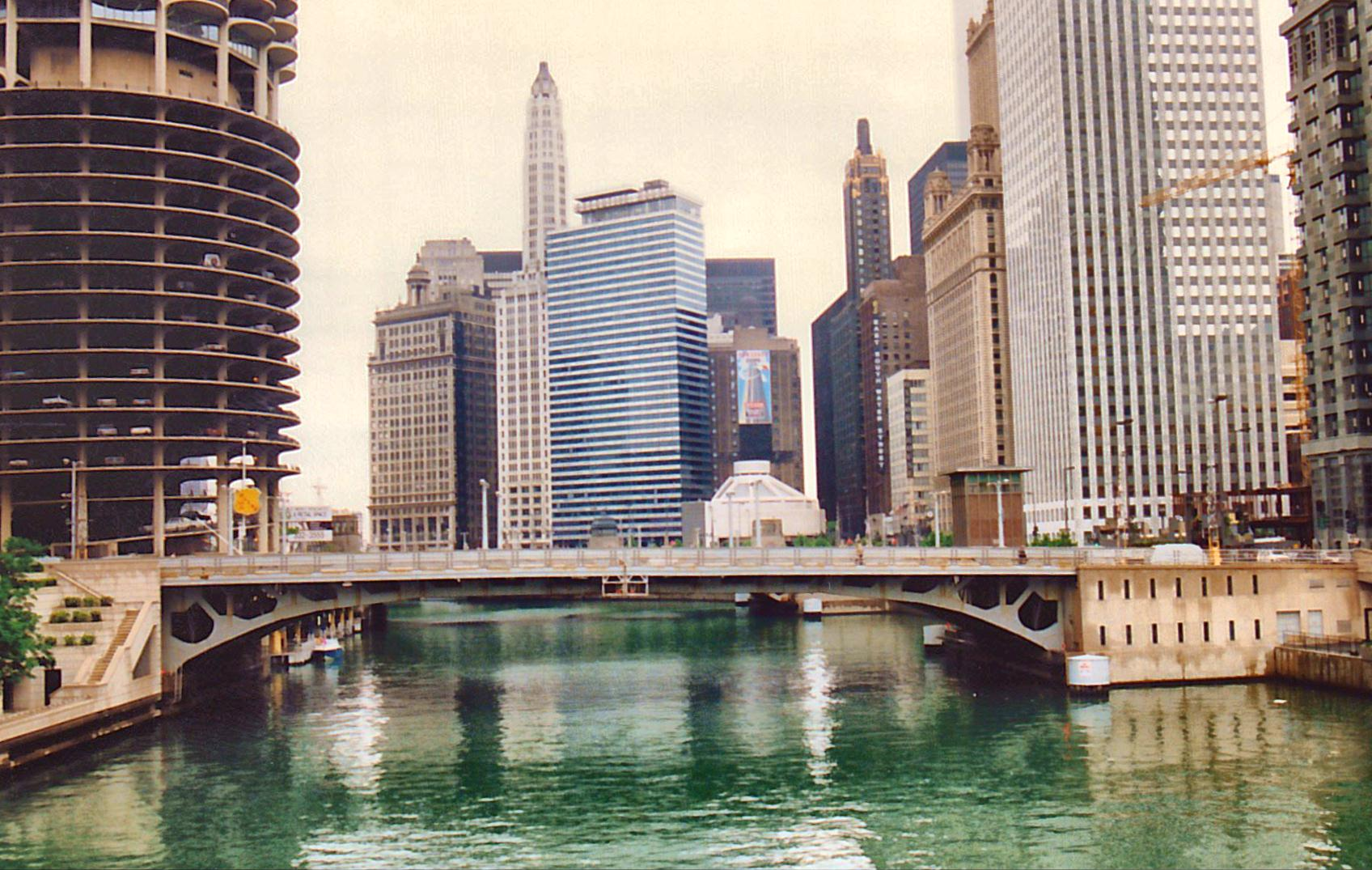
The bridge in 2011

The Dearborn Street Bridge over the Chicago River was built in 1962. It connects the Near North Side with "The Loop." The American Institute of Steel Construction honored the bridge with the 1963 "Most Beautiful Steel Bridge" award in the Movable Span category.

The first drawbridge at Dearborn Street was established in 1834, when Chicago's population was approximately 350. It served as the primary crossing point over the Chicago River for the original town.

1833 Chicago map by Conley & Stelzer, showing the original Dearborn Street Bridge
