= Lambert Latham =

- Born: 1768
- Died: 6 September 1781 (aged 13) Connecticut, United States
- Allegiance: United States
- Service years: 1781
- Conflicts: American Revolutionary War Battle of Groton Heights

Lambert Latham (1768 – September 6, 1781) was an American soldier who fought during the American Revolutionary War at the battle at Fort Griswold in Groton, Connecticut on September 6, 1781. After his commander, Colonel William Ledyard, was killed, Latham continued to fight on and sustained 33 injuries in hand-to-hand combat. Latham subsequently died of his wounds.
