= Ebenezer Avery House =

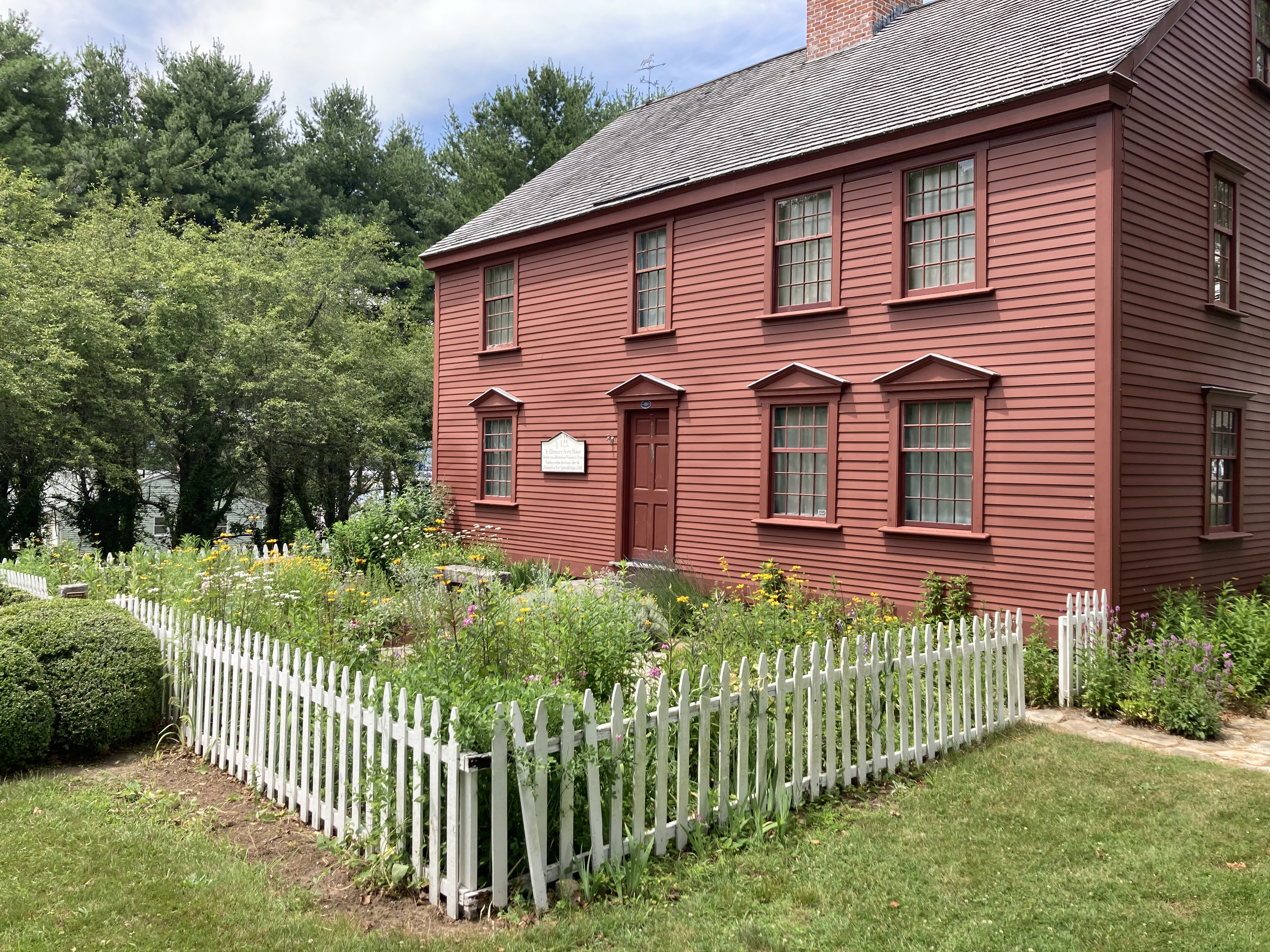
- The Ebenezer Avery House in 2025
- Established: 1975
- Location: 57 Fort Street, Groton, Connecticut
- Coordinates: 41°21′16″N 72°04′53″W
- Type: Historic house museum
- Website: www.averymemorialassociation.com

The Ebenezer Avery House was originally located on Latham Street and Thames Street in Groton, Connecticut. The construction date is unknown, but it is believed to be from the 1760s and was the house of Ebenezer Avery. It was the home where the British brought their injured soldiers after the Battle of Groton Heights on September 6, 1781. In 1971, the house was moved to Fort Griswold Battlefield State Park in Groton and restored. The historic house museum is maintained by the Avery Memorial Association.

== History ==
The Ebenezer Avery House is a 10-room house constructed around the 1760s. It was owned by Ensign Ebenezer Avery. It was originally located on Latham Street and Thames Street in Groton, Connecticut. Avery was a tailor who answered the call for battle on September 6, 1781 and went to defend Fort Griswold from British attack. The Battle of Groton Heights ended with the American defeat and the death of Lieutenant Colonel William Ledyard. It resulted in nearly 100 families being left homeless.

Part of the Ebenezer Avery House history is how it came to be used after the battle while its owner was absent. Some of the wounded from the battle were taken prisoner—those unable to walk, including Stephen Hempstead—and placed on a wagon with others to be taken down to the fleet. The British soldiers allowed the wagon to run down the hill, where it stopped when it struck a tree, throwing some of the men off the wagon and aggravating their injuries.

The wounded were set upon the beach in preparation for the boat trip to New York, but Ebenezer Ledyard, the brother of William Ledyard, offered himself as hostage. The British took the wounded to Ebenezer Avery's house and placed Ebenezer Avery and other wounded inside and had them "parolled". The house was later set on fire with the men inside and "with difficulty extinguished". In the battle, Avery was shot in the neck "which cut the cords, and left him senseless as one of the dead." Hempstead said that 35 men had been laid upon the floor and the British left them, unattended and uncovered, until Dr. Downer and Dr. Prentiss arrived. Ebenezer Avery recovered but lost his hearing, and he continued to live in the house until his death on January 11, 1828 at age 81. The blood stains were still visible at the time of the centennial of the battle in 1881, but no longer are present. In 1896, the Thomas Starr Society placed a memorial tablet on the site.

== Move and restoration ==
In 1970, the Ebenezer Avery House was in danger of being torn down to construct apartments and R. Stanton Avery purchased it with the intention of turning it over to the Avery Memorial Association. Architect Edwin Park assessed the house as in need of extensive reconstruction, and the association discussed the plan to move it to Fort Griswold Battlefield State Park. The association held a meeting on July 24, 1971 to discuss the movement plan which involved disassembling and reassembling the house at its new location. The project to move the house was a shared cost between R. Stanton Avery and the Avery Memorial Association. By the 1972 meeting, the total cost of the relocation was $43,000 and the act provoked interest from the State of Connecticut. The house was donated to the State of Connecticut for use as a historic house museum.

In 1973, the association debated over the sale of land to cover costs of restoring and maintaining the Ebenezer Avery House. The total cost of the move was listed at $80,000, and the intention was to have enough income generated by interest to cover the cost of the house. In May 1975, the Ebenezer Avery House was opened after being restored to its "original condition" and filled with period items, including Lieutenant Ebenezer Avery's sword, a cousin of Ensign Ebenezer Avery killed in the Battle of Groton Heights. According to Leary, bricks from the Fitz-John Winthrop house in Bluff Point State Park were reclaimed and used to reconstruct the chimney of the Ebenezer Avery House. Fitz-John Winthrop's house was a 16 room mansion that fell into disrepair before being destroyed by a fire in 1962.

The Ebenezer Avery House is opened from Memorial Day weekend through Labor Day weekend from 12:00 p.m. to 4:00 p.m. on Fridays, Saturdays, and Sundays.
