= Avery Memorial Association =

The Avery Memorial Association of Groton, CT is a family organization founded in 1895 after the burning of the old Avery Homestead. It was incorporated as a non-profit institution in 1896.

The objective of the Avery Memorial Association is the collection and preservation of objects, documents, memorabilia, buildings, and places which have been connected with members of the family of Captain James Avery of Groton, CT, particularly to maintain the site of the home built about 1656 at Poquonnock Plains, which was occupied by descendants of Captain James Avery until completely destroyed by fire on July 20, 1894, and the memorial monument thereon; also, to provide and preserve such further monumental or other memorials or buildings as may fitly commemorate the distinguished services rendered by the said Captain James Avery or his descendants to the Colony or the State of Connecticut, including the Ebenezer Avery House now located on the grounds of Fort Griswold in Groton; also, to explore the historical background of Connecticut, particularly New London County, and to publish or otherwise make available to the public, including schools, such findings as in any way will further enhance public appreciation and knowledge of the local historical heritage and, finally, to do any and all things which relate directly or indirectly to any of the above exclusive purposes which will advance such purposes.

The Avery Memorial Association has undertaken two major projects, the first being the raison d'être, preservation of the Avery Monument, and the restoration & operation of the Ebenezer Avery House, a historic house museum.

There are two kinds of membership: Regular Members (who are able to prove their lineage linking them to the Groton Avery Clan) and Friends. The Association holds a meeting/reunion every year in the Groton, CT area.

== History ==
The old Avery Homestead, nicknamed "The Hive" or "Avery Hive", was built around 1656 at Poquonnock Plains, and was improved upon by the second Captain James Avery who removed "the unadorned church and watch-tower of the wilderness" in 1684 and carried the materials back to the house and used them in its improvement. Seven generations of the Avery family lived in the house for over 230 years until it was destroyed on July 20, 1894, from a spark from the engine of a passing steam train.

The Groton Avery Clan formed the Avery Memorial Association in 1895 to memorialize the beginnings of the Avery Clan in the Connecticut Colony. The following year it was incorporated as a non-profit, charitable, cultural and educational institution for historic preservation.

== Presidents ==
- 1895–1896 James D. Avery
- 1897–1899 Allyn Avery
- 1900–1935 Elroy M. Avery
- 1936–1955 Christopher L. Avery
- 1956–1967 Deane Avery
- 1968–1975 Amos G. Avery
- 1976–1983 Catherine B. Avery
- 1984–1992 Peter Schellens
- 1993–1995 Catherine Leary
- 1996–2006 Peter Schellens
- 2006–present Stephanie Lantiere

== Monument ==
James Denison Avery deeded the Association the homestead "Hive" site where the monument now stands. Designed by American sculptor and Avery descendant Bela Lyon Pratt, the monument consists of a granite shaft and a bust of a "typical Puritan, magistrate and Indian fighter." The monument rises from the center of where The Hive stood. On July 20, 1900, the monument was formally dedicated in front of 600 Avery descendants. Association President Dr. Elroy M. Avery presided, Helen Morgan Avery unveiled the bust and Frank Montgomery Avery delivered the dedication. The monument was rededicated on its centennial by Cooper Avery Johnson in front of a crowd of 100 Avery descendants.

== Ebenezer Avery House ==
The Ebenezer Avery House was originally located on the corner of Latham and Thames Streets in Groton, Connecticut. Ebenezer Avery was a tailor. His house is believed to have been constructed in the 1760s. It was the location where the British brought the injured soldiers after the Battle of Groton Heights on September 6, 1781. In 1971, the house was moved from its original location closer to the site of the Battle of Groton Heights to Fort Griswold Battlefield State Park in Groton and restored. Though it stands in a state park, the historic house museum continues to be maintained by the Avery Memorial Association.
