= Bluff Point State Park =

State park in New London County, Connecticut

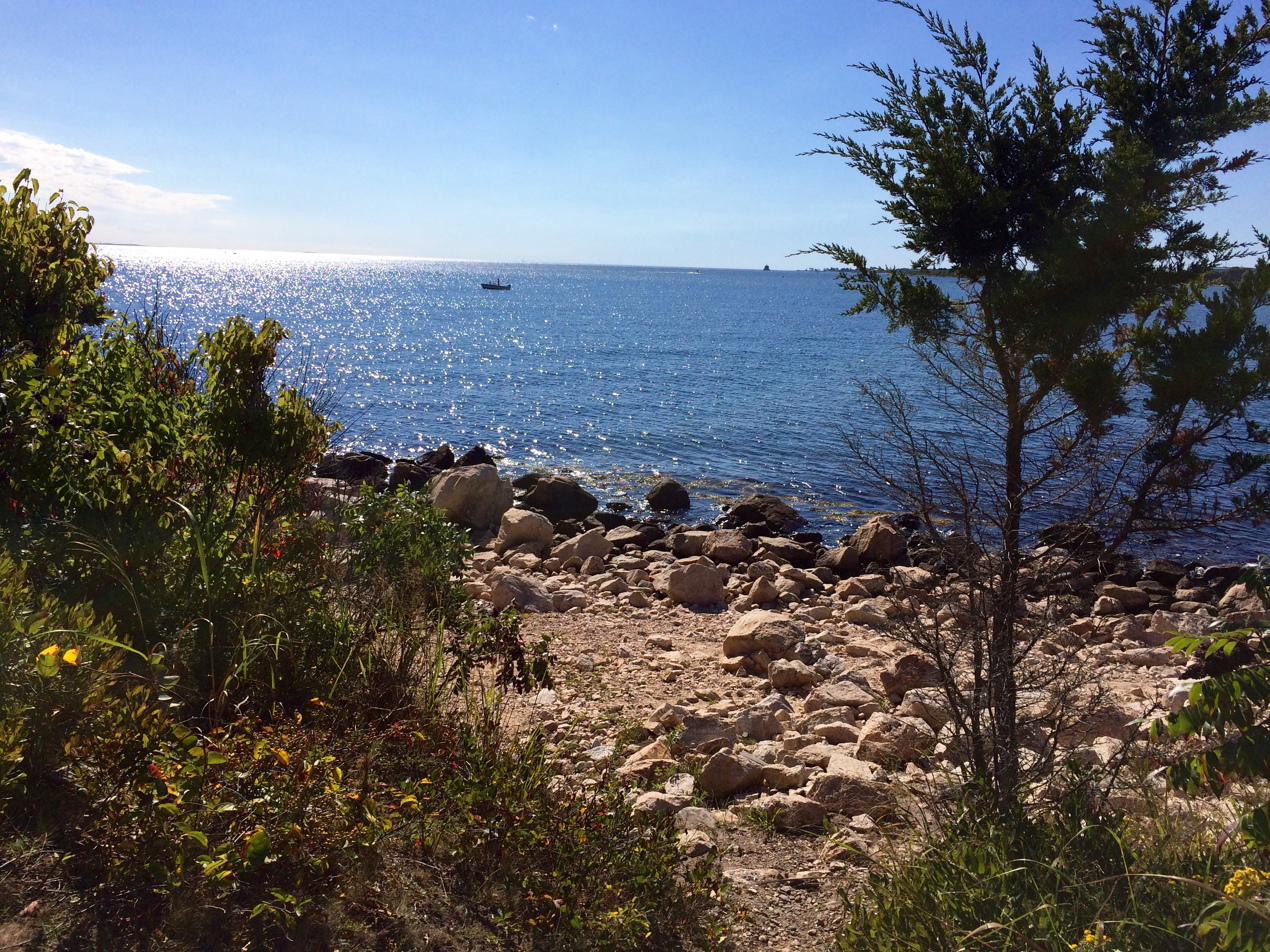
- Bluff Point view of Fisher's / Long Island Sound with Fisher's Island (left) and the New London Ledge Lighthouse (right) visible on the horizon.

- Location within Connecticut Location within the United States
- Interactive map of Bluff Point State Park
- Location: Groton, Connecticut, United States
- Coordinates: 41°18′51″N 72°02′07″W
- Area: 806 acres (326 ha)
- Elevation: 13 ft (4.0 m)
- Established: 1963
- Administrator: Connecticut Department of Energy and Environmental Protection
- Designation: Connecticut state park
- Website: Official website

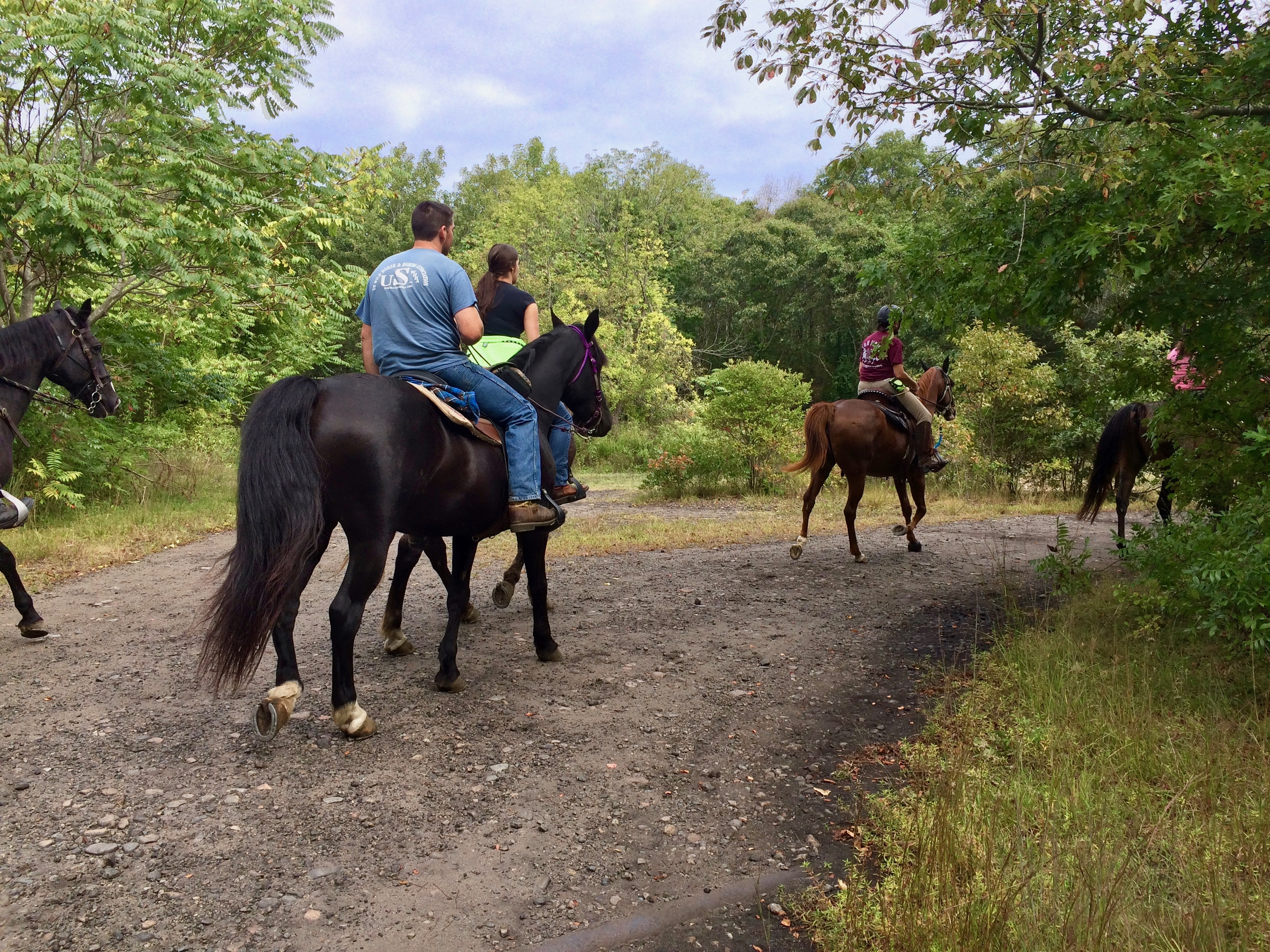
Equestrians on the Groton X-Town Trail in Bluff Point State Park and Coastal Reserve.

Bluff Point State Park is a public recreation area and nature preserve on an undeveloped peninsula located between the Poquonnock River and Mumford Cove on Long Island Sound in the town of Groton, Connecticut. The state park's 806 acres (326 ha) encompass a barrier beach, steep cliffs, forested sections, and tidal wetlands; 778 acres (315 ha) are designated as a coastal reserve. Recreational opportunities include hiking, mountain biking, boating, saltwater fishing, and shell fishing. The park is managed by the Connecticut Department of Energy and Environmental Protection.

== History ==
The Pequot people used the area now called Bluff Point as a source of seafood. Pequot means "people of the shallow water," and Pequot ancestors lived along the coast of Connecticut in villages near cleared land (called poquonnock), where they planted corn, squash, and beans. They ate fish and shellfish from the estuaries. Pequot people also made wampum (beads) from quahog and shelk shells, which were valuable for trading with other tribes in the region.

European colonists arrived in the 1630s. After the 1637 Pequot War, the Pequot tribal lands around Bluff Point were claimed and colonized by the English.

In 1649, the Town of New London granted John Winthrop the Younger a plot of land that became the plantation called Winthrop's Neck. It included present day Bluff Point State Park, Haley Farm State Park, Poquonnock Bridge, Mumford Cove, and Groton Long Point. The property was subsequently divided into Great Farm, also known as Bluff Point, and the Fort Hill Farm.

The farm building called Winthrop House was constructed on Bluff Point circa 1712 by Edward Yeomans on land leased from the Winthrop family. When it burned down in 1962, it left only a chimney standing that would later be used to reconstruct the Ebenezer Avery House's chimney after its relocation to Fort Griswold. The foundations of the farmhouse are still visible. The farm's crops included blackberry bushes and apple trees which continue to thrive. In the early 20th century, Bluff Point was part of an area known as Poquonnock Farm that was leased for potato farming by John Abbott Ackley.

In 1892, Walter Denison opened a summer resort on Bushy Point. As interest in camping rose in the 1910s, Bluff Point became a popular destination by the 1920s. Tents and shacks grew into a small community of summer cottages by the 1930s. The owner of the property decided to stop subleasing the property in June 1938, with the termination in October 1 and the removal of the structures by November 1. Leary writes, "[b]efore a legal protest could be mounted, nature adjudicated the issue. On September 21, 1938, a massive hurricane came ashore at high tide. Except for the old Winthrop place, it destroyed nearly every building on the site." Some 106 homes were lost.

The New London and Stonington Railroad opened in 1858, running across the northern part of Bluff Point. In 1889, successor New York, Providence and Boston Railroad opened the a bridge over the Thames River to the west. The new mainline split from the original line near Mumford Cove and ran further north; the old line became a branch line. In 1904, the New York, New Haven and Hartford Railroad built a large rail yard called Midway Yard at Bluff Point. A freight yard bracketed the mainline, while a roundhouse was built off the branch line. The yard declined beginning in the late 1920s and was abandoned in 1939. The branch line was relocated off Bluff Point in 1942 due to expansion of Trumbull Airport, while the mainline is now the Northeast Corridor. The turntable pit and the roundhouse foundation remain extant inside the park.

Bluff Point was proposed as a state recreation facility as early as 1914. The state acquired the western one-third of Bluff Point from Henry A. Gardiner III in 1963. During that time, the State sought to acquire the land because Bluff Point was the "last remaining significant portion of undeveloped shoreline in Connecticut" and that its "rocky bluffs standing behind narrow beaches typified the Connecticut coast." The Bluff Point Advisory Council, a committee formed of local citizen groups and government representatives, successfully petitioned the state to acquire the land and protect it. The Connecticut legislature established Bluff Point as a Coastal Reserve in 1975. The act gave Bluff Point State Park the highest possible protection in the State Park system and serves to protect the high number of endangered and threatened species that are found within the park.

According to legend, a boulder on the beach, known as Split Rock, suddenly split with "the sound of a cannon shot" in January 1780. Leary notes that it was likely split by freezing water that expanded in a crack in the rock. Sunset Rock was used by residents of the summer community for meetings and religious services; the sunset can no longer be seen from the rock.

== Plants and animals ==
Diverse flora can be found at Bluff Point, owing to an intermingling of habitat areas including salt marshes, coastal woodlands, dunes and intertidal grass beds. This array of habitats also contributes to the broad range of birds found at the park. Several uncommon species of gulls, shorebirds and land birds are among the more than 200 species of birds that have been observed throughout Bluff Point. In contrast, terrestrial animals residing in the park are of fairly common species, including deer, coyotes, foxes and smaller mammals such as rabbits, raccoons and opossums. Offshore wildlife includes horseshoe crabs, clams, mussels, snails and a multitude of crustaceans.

== Activities and amenities ==
The park is notable for bird watching; over 200 species have been seen at the site. Other activities include picnicking, saltwater fishing, shell fishing, hiking, horseback riding, and mountain biking. A ramp for car-top boating is available. Fish caught at Bluff Point include striped bass, sea trout, bluefish, and summer flounder.
