= Fort Trumbull =

State park in New London County, Connecticut

Fort Trumbull State Park
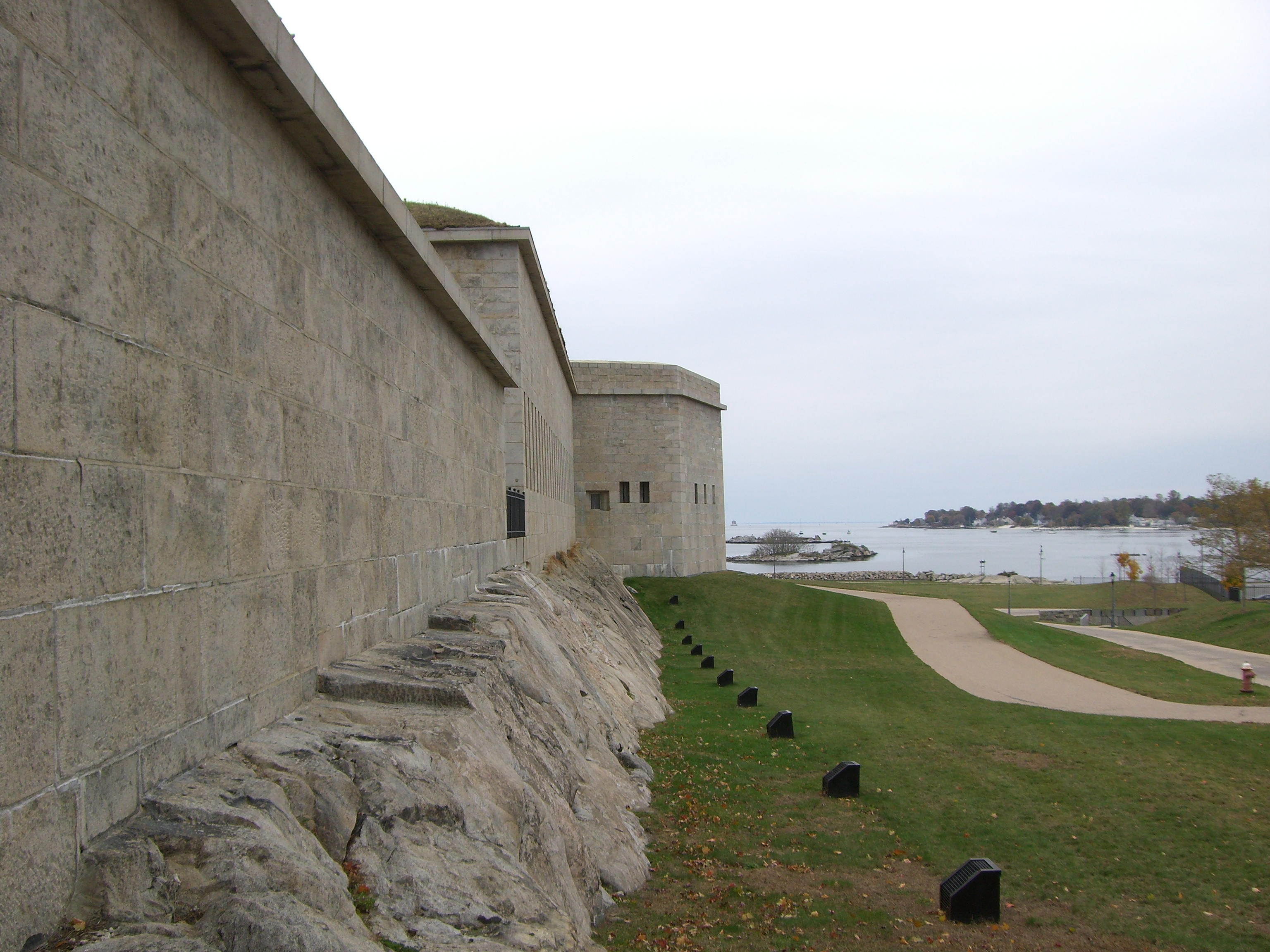
- Fort Trumbull facing Long Island Sound

- Location within Connecticut Location within the United States
- Location: New London, Connecticut, United States
- Coordinates: 41°20′37″N 72°05′35″W
- Area: 17 acres (6.9 ha)
- Elevation: 36 ft (11 m)
- Established: 2000
- Administrator: Connecticut Department of Energy and Environmental Protection
- Designation: Connecticut state park
- Website: Official website
- Fort Trumbull
- U.S. National Register of Historic Places
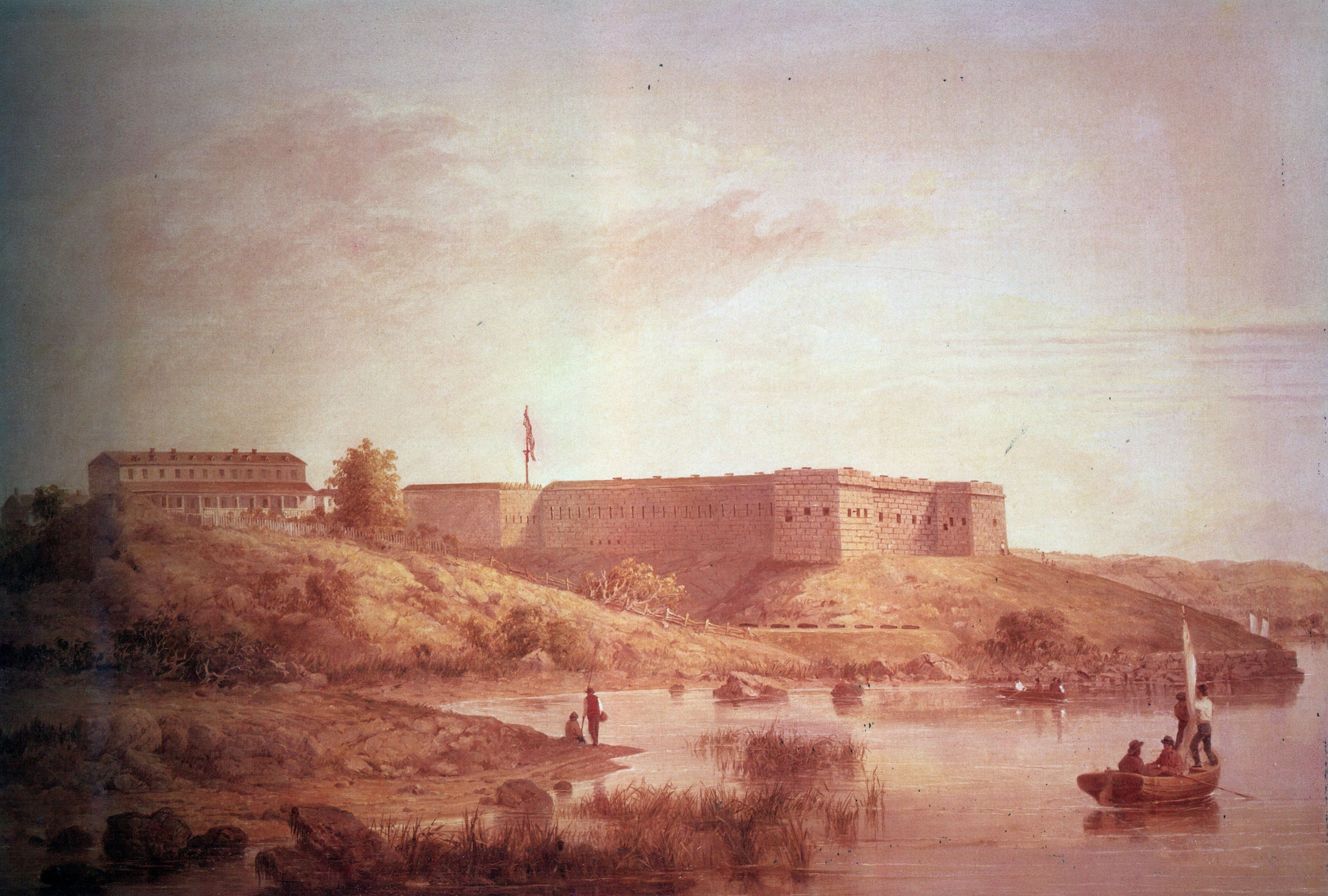
- Fort Trumbull as constructed after 1839, painted by Seth Eastman under commission of the US Army in 1870
- Location: Fort Neck; New London, Connecticut
- NRHP reference No.: 72001333
- Added to NRHP: September 22, 1972

Fort Trumbull is a massive granite fort near the mouth of the Thames River in New London, Connecticut, managed as Fort Trumbull State Park by the Connecticut Department of Energy and Environmental Protection. The original fort was built in 1777 and named for Governor Jonathan Trumbull. The present fortification was built between 1839 and 1852. It lies adjacent to the Coast Guard Station New London.

== History ==
In 1775, Governor Jonathan Trumbull recommended building a fortification at the port of New London to protect the Connecticut government's seat. The fort was built on a rocky point of land near the mouth of the Thames River on Long Island Sound; it was completed in 1777 and named for Governor Trumbull, who served from 1769 to 1784. It was attacked in 1781 during the American Revolutionary War and was captured by British forces under the command of Benedict Arnold.

=== Arnold's raid ===
Benedict Arnold had betrayed his country by this time, and he was serving as a brigadier general in the British Army when he led a raid on Groton and New London, Connecticut, on September 6, 1781. Two bodies of troops were landed on either side of the mouth of the Thames River and marched towards Fort Trumbull in New London under Captain Nathan Frink, and against Fort Griswold in Groton.

Fort Trumbull fell after slight resistance, but about 150 Connecticut militiamen made a stand at Fort Griswold in the Battle of Groton Heights. The British were finally able to enter the fort, and militia commander Lieutenant-Colonel William Ledyard offered his sword to Loyalist officer Major Bromfield as a token of surrender. According to contemporaneous accounts, Bromfield took the sword from Ledyard and drove it through him, and Arnold's men proceeded to show no quarter to the remaining American troops. Eighty-five militiamen were killed, and the others were severely wounded, taken prisoner, or managed to escape. After capturing both forts, Arnold's troops burned New London and returned to their ships.

An account of the battle published in a Philadelphia newspaper follows:

- Extract of a letter from New London, dated Sept. 12.

Arnold had long promised to visit New London and the neighbouring towns on the sea shore, and the enemy having frequently appeared in sight of the harbour, the alarm guns fired on the present occasion were considered by the country around us the salutes of prizes or other vessels belonging to the port. He however arrived the 6th inst. about five o, and at seven o' landed about 2500 men, half on each side of the river. At 8 o' the militia mustered in parties of 8 or 10, and annoyed the enemy until about 100 of them came up and disputed their way to Fort Trumbull; their great superiority obliged our people to yield to them the possession of the fort. Col. Ledyard, with about 76 other brave fellows, retreated to the fort on Groton side, which they determined resolutely to defend. The next assault was upon this fort, where they were repulsed several times by a bravery unequalled, for about three hours. A flag was then sent, demanding a surrender of the fort, accompanies by a threat of giving no quarters in case of refusal. The commandant consulted with his brave garrison, who refused to submit. The action was then renewed, when the flag staff was unfortunately shot away; notwithstanding which the defence was gallantly continued until about five or six hundred of the enemy having forced the pickets had entered through the breach. At this time there were but four of the garrison killed, and it was thought prudent to submit, to preserve the lives of the remainder. The officer who at this time commanded the assailants, (Major Montgomery being killed) enquired who commanded the garrison? Colonel Ledyard informed him that he had had that honour, but was unfortunate in being obliged to surrender it, at the same time delivered up to him his sword, and asked for quarter for himself and people; to which the infamous villain replied, "ye rascals, I give you quarters," and then plunged the sword into his body. The inhuman banditti, taking this as a signal, drove their bayonets up to the muzzles of their pieces into the breasts of all that were taken, except one or two who made their escape.

After massacring the living they insulted the dead, by actions too horrid to mention --- the bodies were arranged alongside of each other for the purpose, and, to shew contempt to Col. Ledyard, they singled out a Negroe to place next to him.

Never was there more distress in any place than there is here at present; there are 50 widows within 8 miles of Groton fort.

Before their departure, which was in the evening of the same day they landed, they burnt all the shipping that could not get up Norwich river, among which were several rich prizes lately arrived, with their cargoes, some of which were stored and the rest on board the vessels – about 40 sail, all on fire, were floating up and down the stream. The prize brig Hope, laden with provisions, happily escaped the general conflagration, altho' the fire from the shore several times caught the awning which covered her quarter deck, and went out --- several vessels in full blaze passed within two and three feet of her; ten lay within forty yards, and consumed to the wateredge, but Providence directed she should escape, and a very fortunate one it was, as there was no other supply of provisions in town. – The Pennsylvania Gazette, September 26, 1781

=== 19th century ===
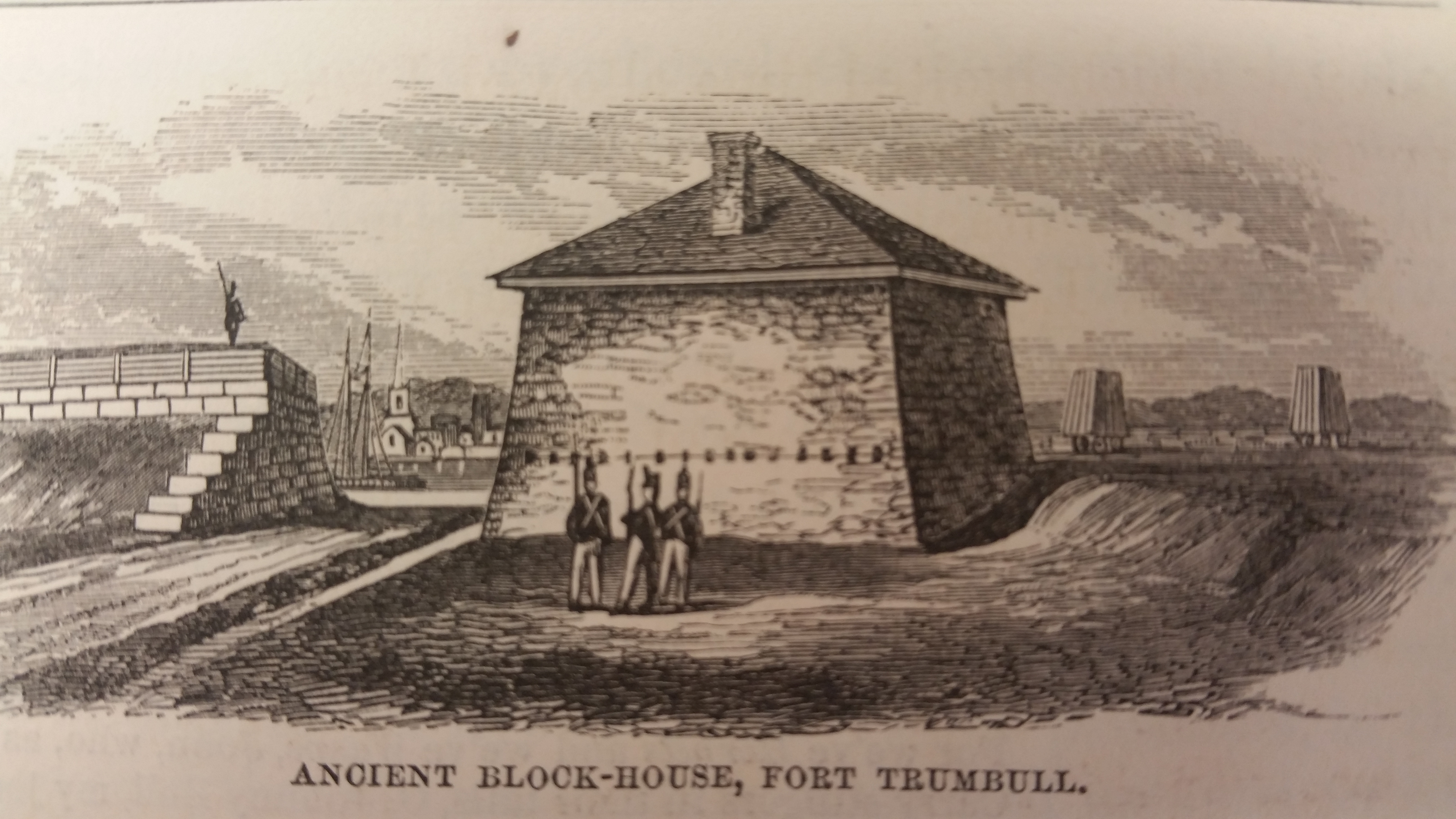
Fort Trumbull

The fort was repaired around 1808, then redesigned and rebuilt in 1812 to meet changing military needs under the second system of US fortifications. First, a redoubt was built at the site to defend against a possible British attack. Secretary of War Henry Dearborn's report on fortifications for December 1811 describes the fort as "an irregular enclosed work of masonry and sod, mounting 18 heavy guns [with] a brick barracks for one company". The present fortification replaced the older fort, and was built between 1839 and 1852 as a five-sided, four-bastion coastal defense fort. It could accommodate 42 guns on the seacoast fronts, 10 additional guns in two flanking batteries outside the fort, and flank howitzers in bastions for close-in defense. The new fort was built under the supervision of Army engineer George Washington Cullum, who later served as superintendent of the United States Military Academy at West Point, New York.

During the American Civil War, Fort Trumbull served as an organizational center for Union troops and headquarters for the 14th US Infantry Regiment. Here, troops were recruited and trained before being sent to war. Fort Trumbull was briefly commanded by John F. Reynolds, who rose to the rank of major general and was killed at the Battle of Gettysburg in 1863.

From 1863 to 1879, Ordnance Sergeant Mark Wentworth Smith was assigned to Fort Trumbull and served as the caretaker of Fort Griswold, which was an un-garrisoned sub-post of Fort Trumbull across the Thames River in the town of Groton. Among other duties, he maintained a vegetable garden to help feed the soldiers at Fort Trumbull. Smith was born in New Hampshire in 1803 and enlisted in the Army on January 27, 1827, at age 23. He was wounded in action at the Battle of Chapultepec during the Mexican War. He was allowed to serve on active duty in the Army until he died in 1879 at age 76. He was the oldest enlisted man to serve on active duty in the United States Army in the 19th century. (Note: In the 20th century, Army Air Forces Master Sergeant John W. Westervelt served on active duty during World War II until he retired at age 77 in 1945.) Sergeant Smith is buried in the Colonel Ledyard Cemetery in Groton.

In the late 1800s, Fort Trumbull was modified to accommodate 15-inch and 10-inch Rodman smoothbore guns and 8-inch converted rifles. Two 8-inch converted rifles are still in a restored firing position at Fort Trumbull.

=== 20th century ===
==== Coast Guard Academy ====
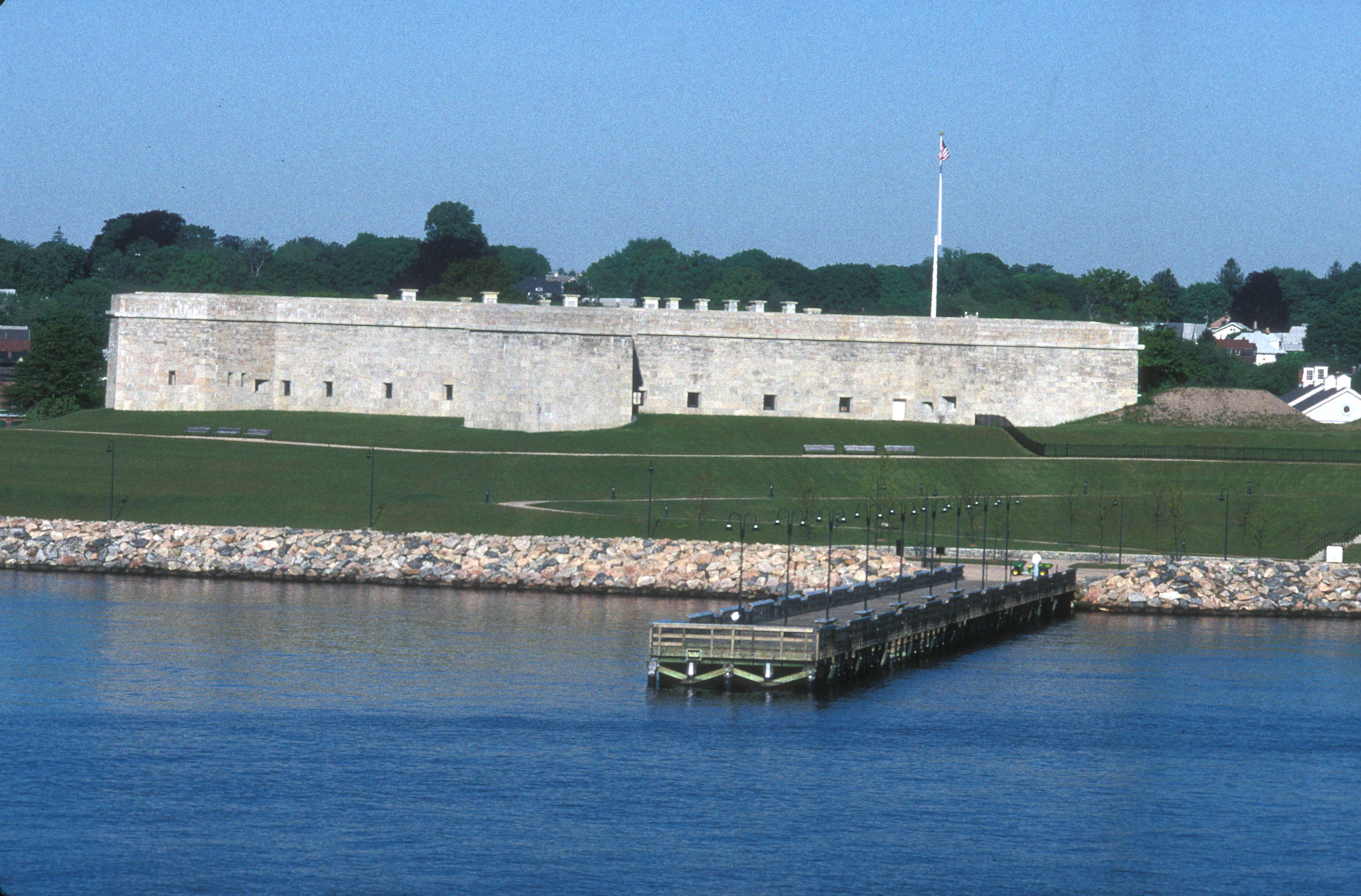
Fort Trumbull today

After the Civil War, Fort Trumbull was improved by having more modern artillery pieces installed. In the early 1900s, several more modern Endicott era fortifications were built to defend Long Island Sound as the Harbor Defenses of Long Island Sound, including Fort Mansfield in Watch Hill, Rhode Island, Fort H.G. Wright on Fishers Island, and Fort Michie on Great Gull Island. Fort Trumbull served as the headquarters of these forts until it was turned over to the Revenue Cutter Service (later renamed the Coast Guard) in 1910 for use as the Revenue Cutter Academy, which was renamed the United States Coast Guard Academy in 1915. The academy moved to its current location about two miles up the Thames River in 1932.

==== Education facility ====
Fort Trumbull served as the Merchant Marine Officers Training School from 1939 to 1946 and trained over 15,000 of the Merchant Marine officers who served during the Second World War. One of the Merchant Marine officers trained there was actor Jack Lord, who is best known for playing Steve McGarrett on the popular TV series Hawaii Five-O in the 1960s and 70s. The Fort was the site of a satellite campus of the University of Connecticut from 1946 to 1950, educating war veterans attending college under the GI Bill.

==== Naval Underwater Sound Laboratory ====
During World War II, Fort Trumbull hosted an office of Columbia University's Division of War Research, which developed passive sonar systems. By 1946, this was consolidated with Harvard University's Underwater Sound Laboratory at Fort Trumbull. A result of this work was that Fort Trumbull was the location for the Naval Underwater Sound Laboratory from 1946 to 1970, which developed sonar and related systems for US Navy submarines. In 1970, the Sound Laboratory was merged with the Naval Underwater Weapons Systems Center (NUWS) to form the Naval Underwater Systems Center (NUSC) in Newport, Rhode Island. Work continued at both locations until the facility at Fort Trumbull was finally closed in 1996, marking the end of almost a century and a half of Fort Trumbull's service as a federal military facility.

== State park ==
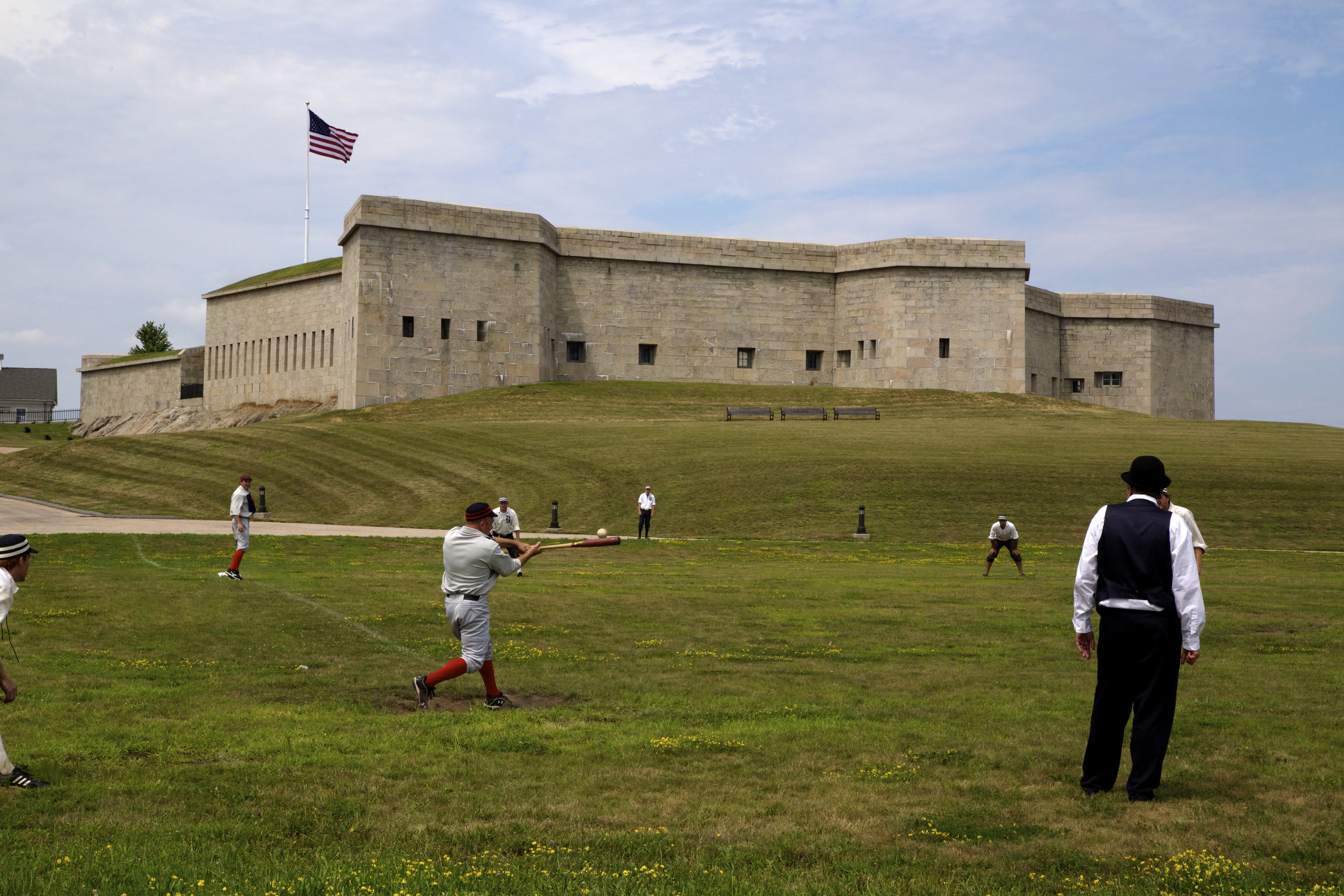
Thames Baseball club playing at Fort Trumbull in New London, CT

After a redevelopment period lasting several years, Fort Trumbull was opened as a state park in the year 2000. Exhibits include informative markers, cannon and artillery crew displays, and gun emplacements. The interior features restored 19th-century living quarters and a mock laboratory furnished to resemble a 1950s era office facility. The park also offers a large fishing pier and is a site for concerts and other special events. The main fort is open to the public and has an elevator to access the upper portions of the fort.

== See also ==
- Seacoast defense in the United States
- National Register of Historic Places listings in New London County, Connecticut

== Sources ==
- Wade, Arthur P. (2011). Artillerists and Engineers: The Beginnings of American Seacoast Fortifications, 1794–1815. CDSG Press. ISBN 978-0-9748167-2-2.
- Weaver II, John R. (2018). A Legacy in Brick and Stone: American Coastal Defense Forts of the Third System, 1816-1867, 2nd Ed. McLean, VA: Redoubt Press. ISBN 978-1-7323916-1-1.
- The History of Fort Trumbull by John Duchesneau
