= Groton Monument =

Granite monument in Groton, Connecticut

Coordinates: 41.3550°N 72.0794°W

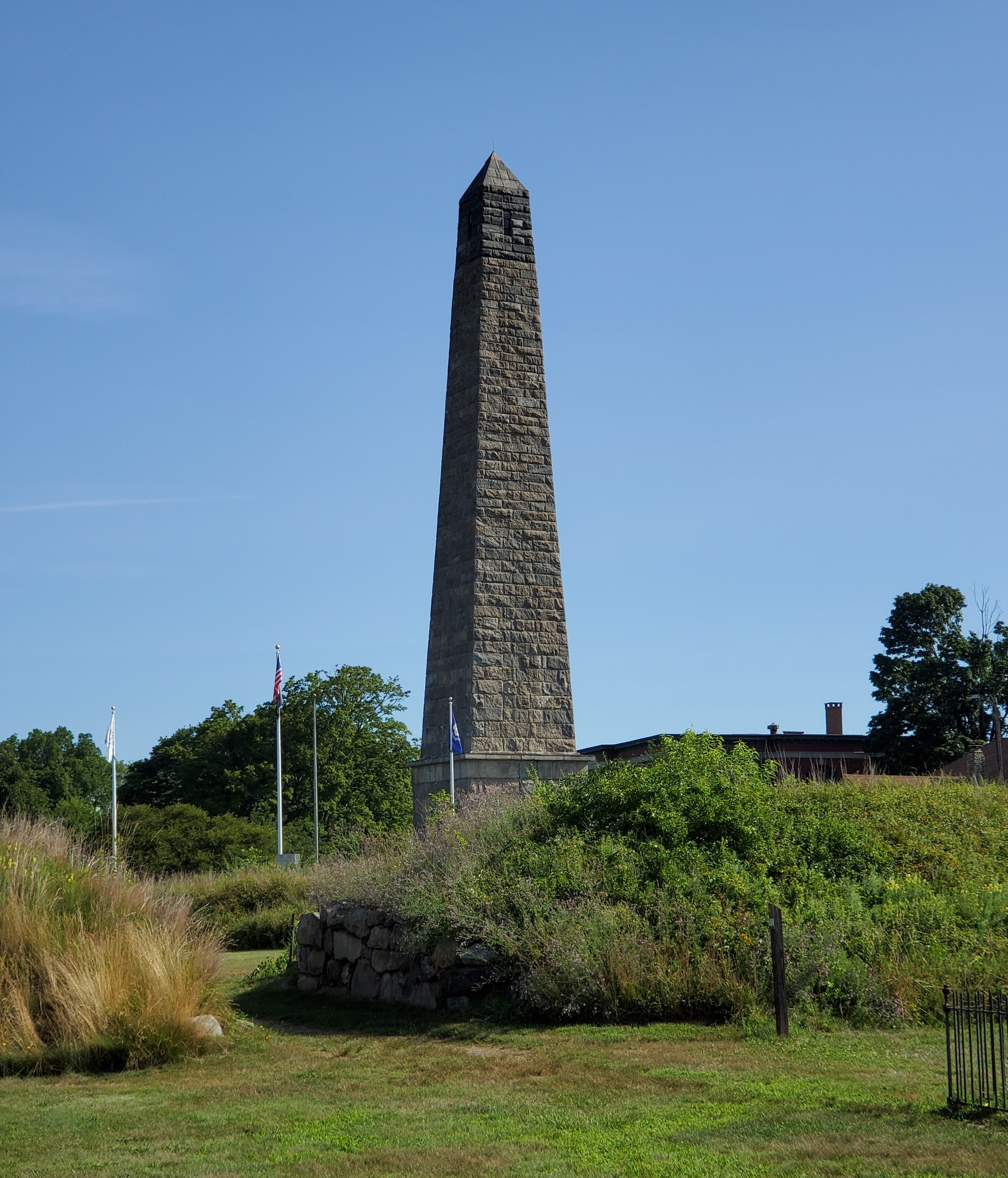
The monument was erected in 1830 to commemorate the American troops massacred by the British following the surrender of Fort Griswold in the Battle of Groton Heights during the American Revolution.

The Groton Monument, sometimes called the Fort Griswold Monument, is a 135 feet (41 m) granite obelisk in Groton, Connecticut dedicated to the defenders who fell during the Battle of Groton Heights on September 6, 1781. The monument bears a plaque describing the events of the Battle of Groton Heights, and another plaque with the names of the Americans who died in the battle. Lightning destroyed the capstone in 1918 and damaged the adjacent Monument House Museum which features exhibits about the Revolutionary War. Visitors can climb the monument and visit the museum from Memorial Day through Labor Day. The Groton Monument is located in Fort Griswold Battlefield State Park, which includes Fort Griswold.

== Design ==
The Groton Monument Association was incorporated in 1820 and hired the partnership of Ithiel Town and Alexander Jackson Davis to design the monument. The cornerstone was laid on September 6, 1825 and the monument was completed in 1830. It was originally 127 feet (39 m) high, but this was changed in 1881 to commemorate the centennial of the Battle of Groton Heights when the cupola was removed and replaced by an iron-capped pyramid in emulation of the Bunker Hill Monument. As a result of these renovations, the height was extended to 135 feet (41 m) high.

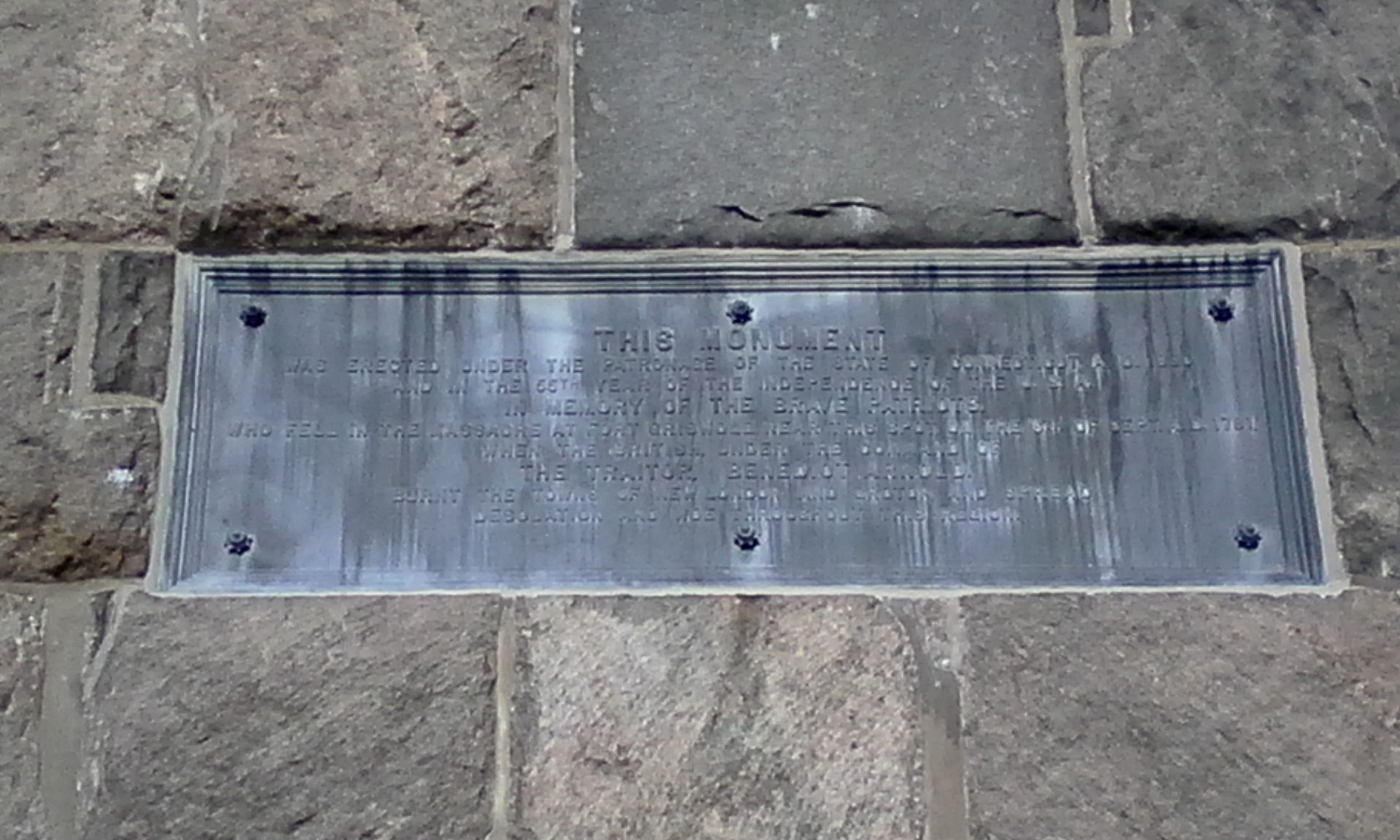
Dedication plaque on Groton Monument

A plaque affixed to the monument above the entrance reads:
"THIS MONUMENT WAS ERECTED UNDER THE PATRONAGE OF THE STATE OF CONNECTICUT, A.D. 1830, AND IN THE 55TH YEAR OF THE INDEPENDENCE OF THE U.S.A. IN MEMORY OF THE BRAVE PATRIOTS, WHO FELL IN THE MASSACRE AT FORT GRISWOLD, NEAR THIS SPOT, ON THE 6TH OF SEPT. A.D. 1781, WHEN THE BRITISH, UNDER THE COMMAND OF THE TRAITOR, BENEDICT ARNOLD, BURNT THE TOWNS OF NEW LONDON AND GROTON, AND SPREAD DESOLATION AND WOE THROUGHOUT THIS REGION."

Another plaque lists the 88 American soldiers who were killed during the battle. It has seven minor spelling errors in naming, such as "Thomas Minard" for Thomas Miner. The plaque includes at least two African American soldiers.

== Repairs ==
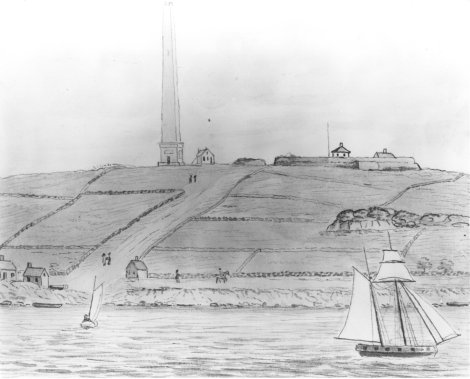
Groton Monument and Fort Griswold, a sketch by John Warner Barber for his Historical Collections of Connecticut (1836)

The monument was repaired and the grounds were renovated with an appropriation of $5,000 from the State of Connecticut in 1893 and completed by early 1894. Lightning struck the monument in 1918, shattering the capstone and sending the pieces to the ground, then traveling through the brass railings and scattering the cards in one of the wire-racks. The lightning also jumped 25 feet (7.6 m) to the monument house and damaged the veranda, raising the brick tiling on the floor and doing minor damage inside the museum. Frederic Bill could not find a fitting match for the original capstone.

In 1985, Hurricane Gloria blew out a window of the monument, and the State of Connecticut spent $6,250 to re-mortar it in 1986. The monument was closed until 1989 for the repair work. In 2007, Carol Kimball of the New London Day wrote that the State of Connecticut was not funding repairs to the historic site, but it would be required if the monument were to survive. She also referred to a New York Times article on the neglected monument and pointed out that the bond commission had yet to issue the approved $350,000 for its preservation. Other repairs would cost an additional $150,000, including sidewalks surrounding the entrance and the memorial gate.

== See also ==
- National Register of Historic Places listings in New London County, Connecticut
