= Haley Farm State Park =

Public recreation area in Groton, US

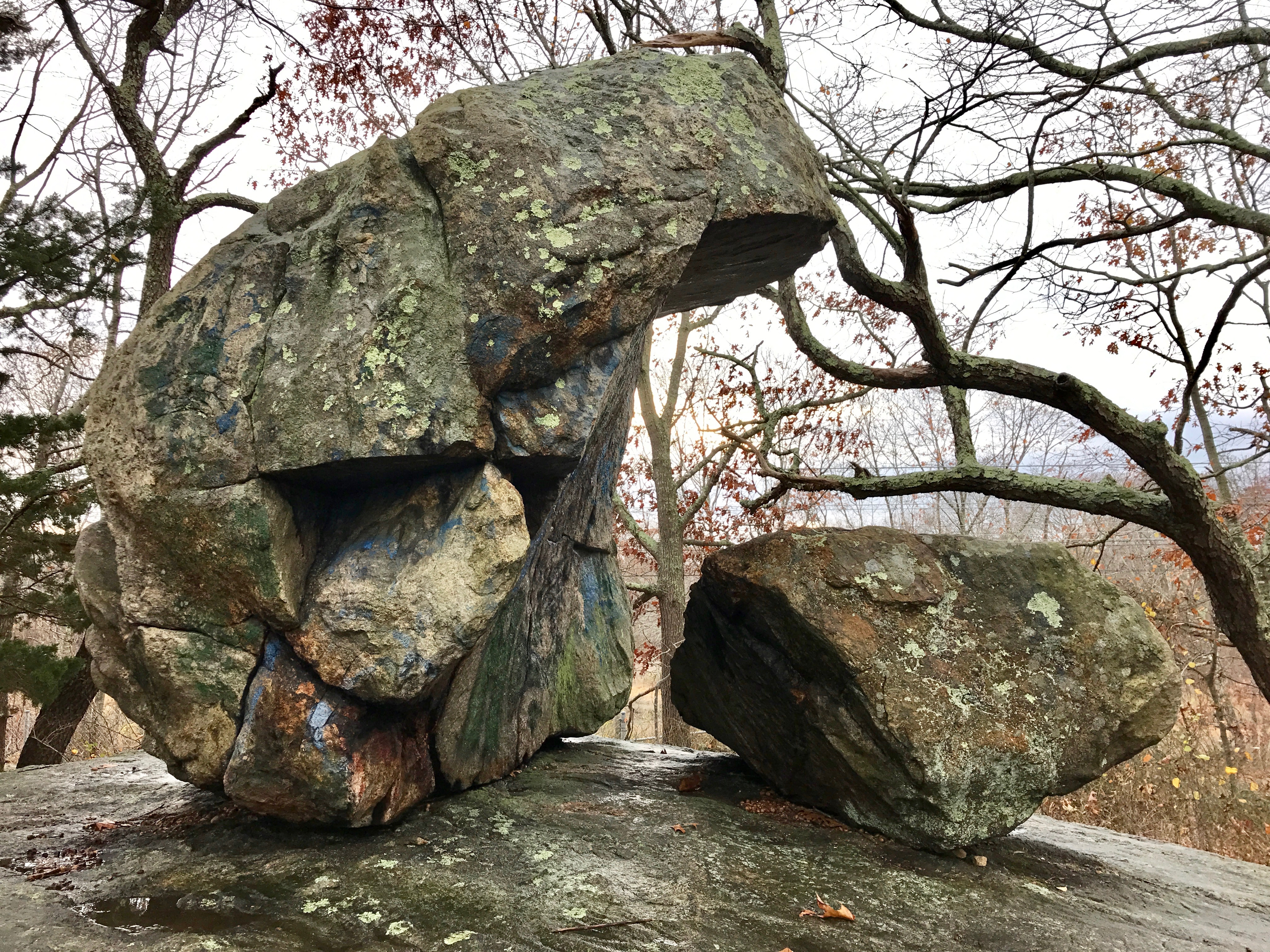
- Canopy Rock in southern Haley Farm State Park

- Location within Connecticut Location within the United States
- Location: Groton, Connecticut, United States
- Coordinates: 41°19′55″N 72°00′33″W
- Area: 267 acres (108 ha)
- Elevation: 43 ft (13 m)
- Designation: Connecticut state park
- Established: 1970
- Administrator: Connecticut Department of Energy and Environmental Protection
- Website: Haley Farm State Park

Haley Farm State Park is a public recreation area that preserves Colonial-era farmland as open space in the town of Groton, Connecticut. The site of the state park once formed part of the lands granted to Governor John Winthrop and later became a dairy farm. The park's 267 acres (108 ha) are connected to the adjacent Bluff Point State Park by way of a pedestrian bridge over railroad tracks. Park activities are restricted to bicycling and walking. The park is managed by Connecticut Department of Energy and Environmental Protection.

== History ==
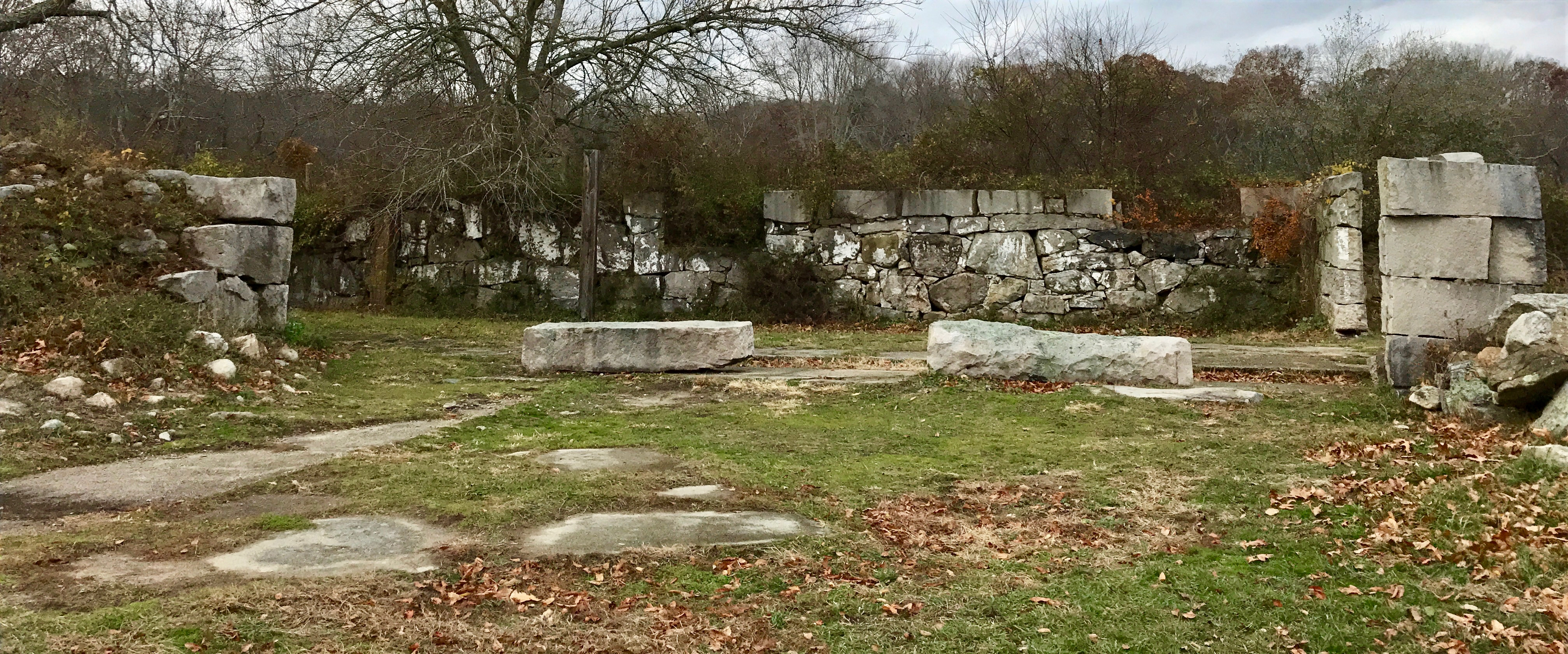
Haley Farm homestead walls and ruins today.

Land containing the acreage for Haley Farm State Park was part of a larger parcel granted to John Winthrop, Jr., in 1649. Known as "John Winthrop the Younger," Winthrop was governor of the Saybrook Colony and is often recognized as "Connecticut's first governor." The land was later split up, with the piece containing Haley Farm designated as Fort Hill Farm. The farm was purchased by Starr Chester in 1789 and passed to Noyes Barber in 1833. The land was split again in 1852 with the farm being sold to Henry B. Lewis. Four hundred acres were sold to Caleb Haley in 1869 for the price of $12,000. Haley farmed the land, built stone walls throughout the property and raced horses around "Racetrack Pond." The land passed to his son, Samuel Haley, after his death in 1924. Samuel Haley continued to operate the farm until his death in 1947, when it was passed to his daughter Juliet Haley. The farm produced cream and milk that was shipped to Noank, West Mystic and Mystic. In 1953, the farm was sold out of the Haley family to A. C. White who abandoned the farm to develop a gully called Mumford Cove and placed the 250-acre parcel of land containing Haley Farm for sale. In 1960, the homestead burned down and the other buildings eventually were demolished in 1973 after being documented for possible future reconstruction.

In 1963, efforts were made to purchase the land to prevent it from being developed. The town opposed re-zoning the site for multi-residential development. The land was sold from Alcor Inc. to O&G Construction Co. as a 250-acre parcel in 1966. A total of 198 acres of land was returned to White when O&G Construction "were in arrears on their payments and back taxes." In July 1970, the state acquired 198 acres of Haley Farm from A. C. White for a total of $300,000, with federal funding accounting for $150,000, state funding for $100,000, and the remaining $50,000 coming from the Groton Open Space Association, a local organization that completed raising the required funds in early 1970. At the time, the Park and Forest Commission said there were no plans to make it into a park. However, the Department of Energy and Environmental Protection recognizes that Haley Farm was officially made a Connecticut State Park in July 1970.

In 1975, a bike trail from Mystic to Noank was established, part which goes through the Haley Farm State Park.

In 2001, the "Racetrack Pond" area was purchased from the Mumford Cove Association. In 2002, a total of 57 acres was added to the park through the purchase 49.95 acres from Guerra-DeAngelis Trustees and 7.14 acres from Bowen Briggs for a total purchase price of $913,300. The funds for the purchase, which was 30 years in the making, were provided by the State of Connecticut's Recreation and Natural Heritage Trust Program.

== Vegetation ==
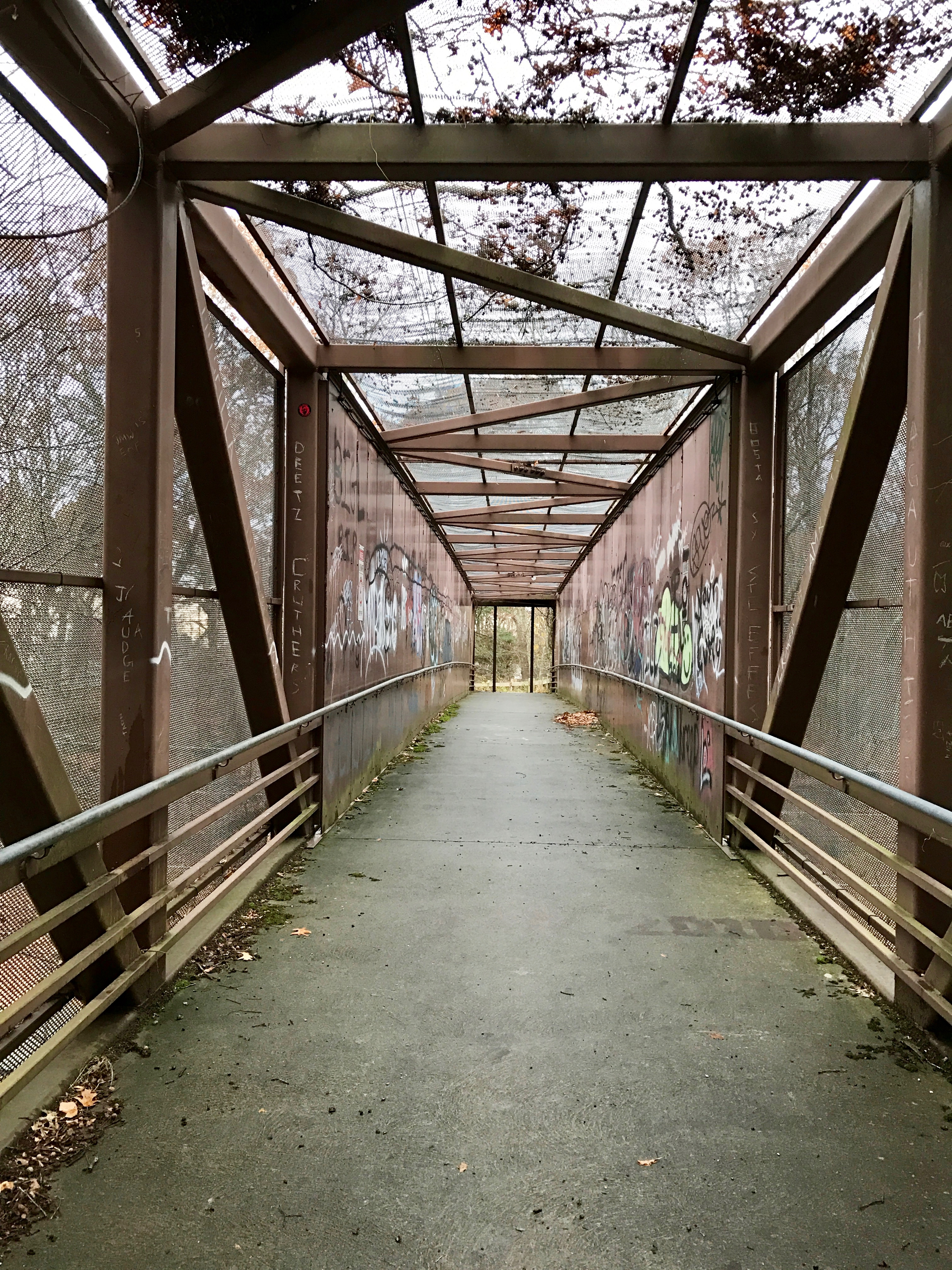
Pedestrian bridge connecting Haley Farm and Bluff Point state parks

The park hosts a wide range of upland and wetland vegetation. Algae and intertidal plants can be found at the shore including salt meadow grass, sedge, and sphagnum moss; the park's swampy areas have red maple and tulip trees; the upland sections include cherry, hickory, and shrubs.

== Activities and amenities ==
The park offers trails for non-motorized uses: hiking, jogging, and cycling. The park is connected to Bluff Point State Park over a pedestrian bridge that crosses Amtrak railroad tracks, built atop the former Groton and Stonington Street Railway bridge. The park's 0.8-mile (1.3 km) bike trail forms part of a 7.5-mile (12.1 km) town-owned bikeway from Mystic to Groton.
