= Battle of Groton Heights =

Battle of the American Revolutionary War 1781

- Part of the American Revolutionary War
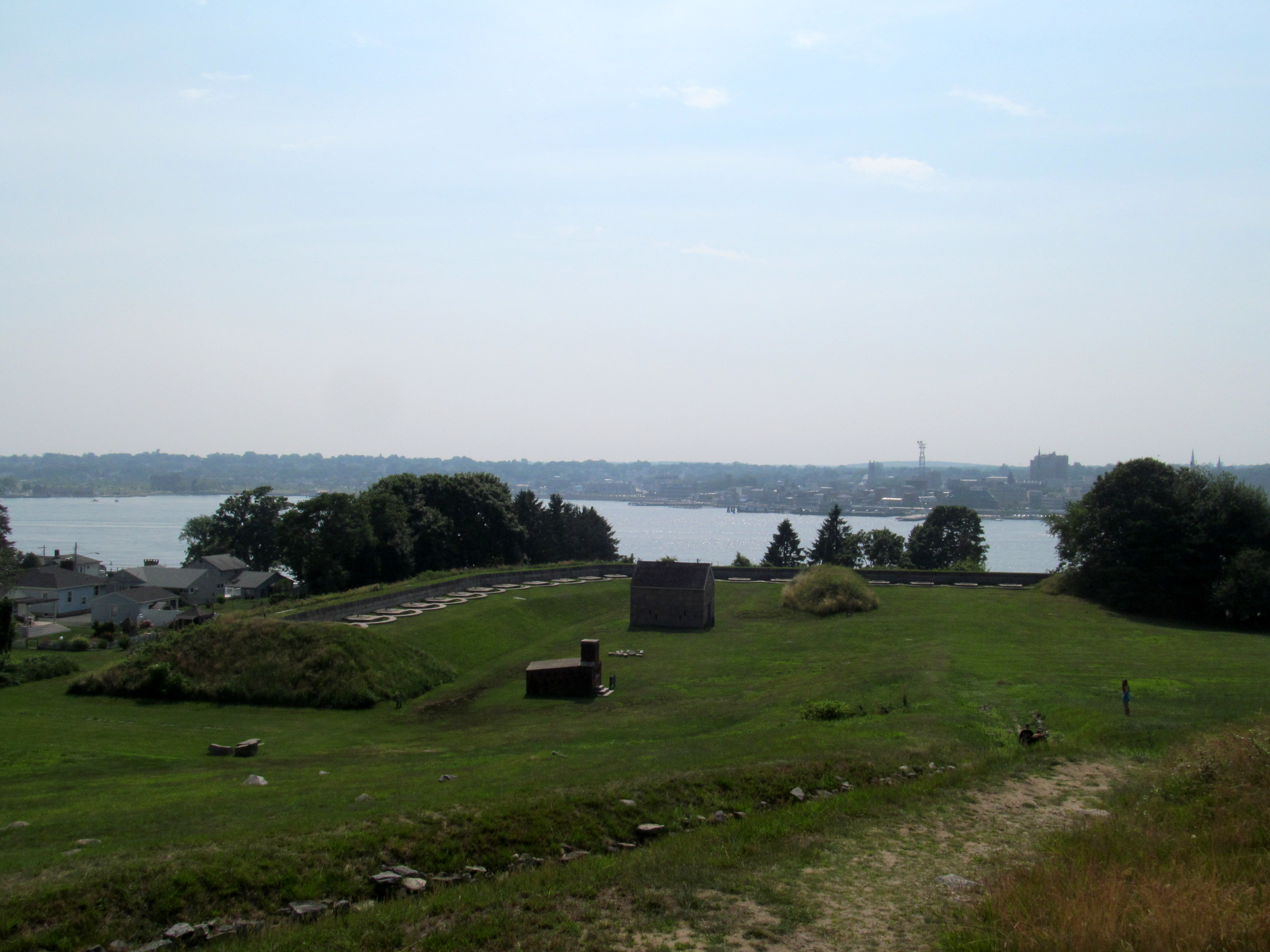
- Fort Griswold on Groton Heights, across the Thames River from New London
Date	September 6, 1781
Location	New London and Groton, Connecticut 41°21′13″N 72°04′46″W
Result	British victory

Belligerents
United States	Great Britain; Hesse-Kassel

Commanders and leaders
William Ledyard †; William Latham	Benedict Arnold; Edmund Eyre; John Bazely

Strength
New London: Unknown; Fort Griswold: 150 regulars	1,700 regulars (800 engaged at Fort Griswold)

Casualties and losses
Total Losses: 145; 85 killed; 60 wounded (many mortally)	Total Losses: 197; 52 killed; 145 wounded

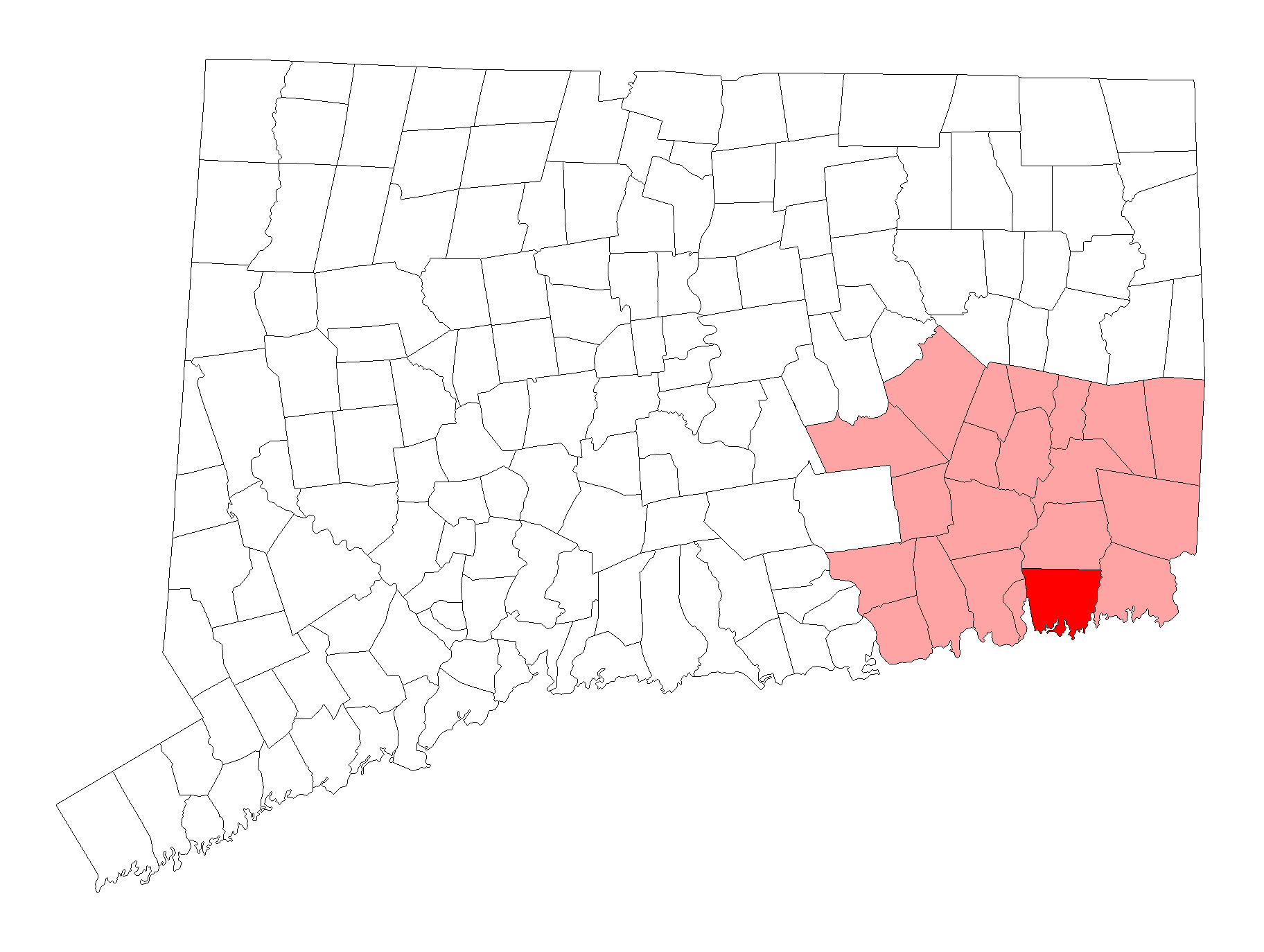
Location of Groton, Connecticut

The Battle of Groton Heights (also known as the Battle of Fort Griswold, and occasionally called the Fort Griswold massacre) was a battle of the American Revolutionary War fought on September 6, 1781, between a small Connecticut militia force led by Lieutenant Colonel William Ledyard and the more numerous British forces led by Brigadier General Benedict Arnold and Lieutenant Colonel Edmund Eyre.

Lieutenant General Sir Henry Clinton ordered Arnold to raid the port of New London, Connecticut, to divert General George Washington from marching against Lord Cornwallis's army in Virginia. The raid was a success, but the Connecticut militia stubbornly resisted British attempts to capture Fort Griswold across the Thames River in Groton, Connecticut. New London was burned along with several ships, but many more ships escaped upriver.

Several leaders of the attacking British force were killed or seriously wounded, but the British eventually breached the fort. As the British entered the fort the Americans surrendered, but the British continued firing and killed many of the defenders. However, the high number of British casualties in the overall expedition against Groton and New London led to criticism of Arnold by some of his superiors. The battle was the last major military encounter of the war in the northern United States, preceding and being overshadowed by the decisive Franco-American Siege of Yorktown about six weeks later.

== Background ==
Groton's history dates back to 1655. It was originally a part of New London, its larger counterpart on the other side of the Thames River on the northern shore of Long Island Sound. It was an important maritime port and became one of the largest along the New England coastline. Groton officially separated from New London and incorporated as a separate town in 1705.

During the American Revolutionary War, the Groton–New London port was a major center of American naval operations, including highly successful privateering operations against British shipping, yet it was poorly protected. Fort Trumbull on the New London side was little more than a redoubt open on the inland side, while Fort Griswold in Groton was a more substantial fort. It was roughly square and bastioned, surrounded by a ditch and some outer earthen defenses. Both were typically garrisoned by small companies of militia, including a few artillerymen, and overall command of the area's defenses was directed by Lieutenant Colonel William Ledyard. The forts suffered from continuous shortages of provisions and equipment. Fort Trumbull was unfinished; Fort Griswold's infrastructure was complete, but it lacked sufficient gunpowder, cannonballs, food, and troops to conduct an effective stand against the British.

In August 1781, Continental Army Major General George Washington realized that there was an opportunity to strike at the British army of Lieutenant General Charles Cornwallis in Virginia. He began moving his forces south from the New York area, using a variety of stratagems to deceive Lieutenant General Sir Henry Clinton, the British Commander-in-Chief and head of the British forces in New York City. Clinton realized on September 2 that he had been deceived.

Clinton decided to launch a raid into Connecticut in an effort to draw Washington's attention. He only planned it as a raid, but he also believed that New London could be used as a base for further operations into the interior of New England if a permanent British occupation could be established. He gave Brigadier General Benedict Arnold command of the forces for the raid. Arnold was a native of Norwich, Connecticut, just up the river from New London. He had been a successful Patriot general, but had changed sides to support the British the previous September.

== Prelude ==
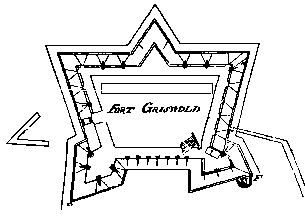
Plan of Fort Griswold, sketched by a British officer.

The forces assembled by the British were divided into two divisions, numbering about 1,700 men. The first was under Lieutenant Colonel Edmund Eyre, composed of the 40th and 54th Regiments of Foot and a Loyalist provincial regiment of Cortlandt Skinner's New Jersey Volunteers. The second division was under Arnold's command and consisted of the 38th Foot and a variety of Loyalist units, including the Loyal American Regiment and Arnold's provincial regiment, known as the American Legion. The expedition also included about 100 Hessian jägers, a small number of artillerymen, three six-pound guns, and a howitzer, all of which were divided among the divisions. These troops were embarked on transports and sailed on September 4 in the company of a fleet of smaller armed ships, led by Commodore John Bazely in the fifth-rate HMS Amphion.

The fleet anchored about 30 miles (48 km) west of New London to make final preparations, and then sailed for New London late on September 5, intending to make a nighttime landing. However, contrary winds prevented the transports from reaching the port until it was already daylight on September 6. In the early hours of that morning, Rufus Avery witnessed the fleet's arrival as a colonial officer stationed at Fort Griswold:

... about three o'clock in the morning, as soon as I had daylight so as to see the fleet, it appeared a short distance below the lighthouse. The fleet consisted of thirty-two vessels ... I immediately sent word to Captain William Latham, who commanded [Fort Griswold], and who was not far distant. He very soon came to the fort, and saw the enemy's fleet, and immediately sent a notice to Col. William Ledyard, who was commander of the harbor, Fort Griswold, and Fort Trumbull.

Upon receiving the alert, Ledyard sent a messenger to notify Governor Jonathan Trumbull and local militia leaders of the British arrival, and went to Fort Griswold to arrange its defenses. Fort Griswold's guns were fired twice, a signal of enemy approach. However, one of the British ships fired a third round, changing the meaning of the signal to indicate the arrival of a victorious friend. This signal confusion led to delays in mustering militia companies.

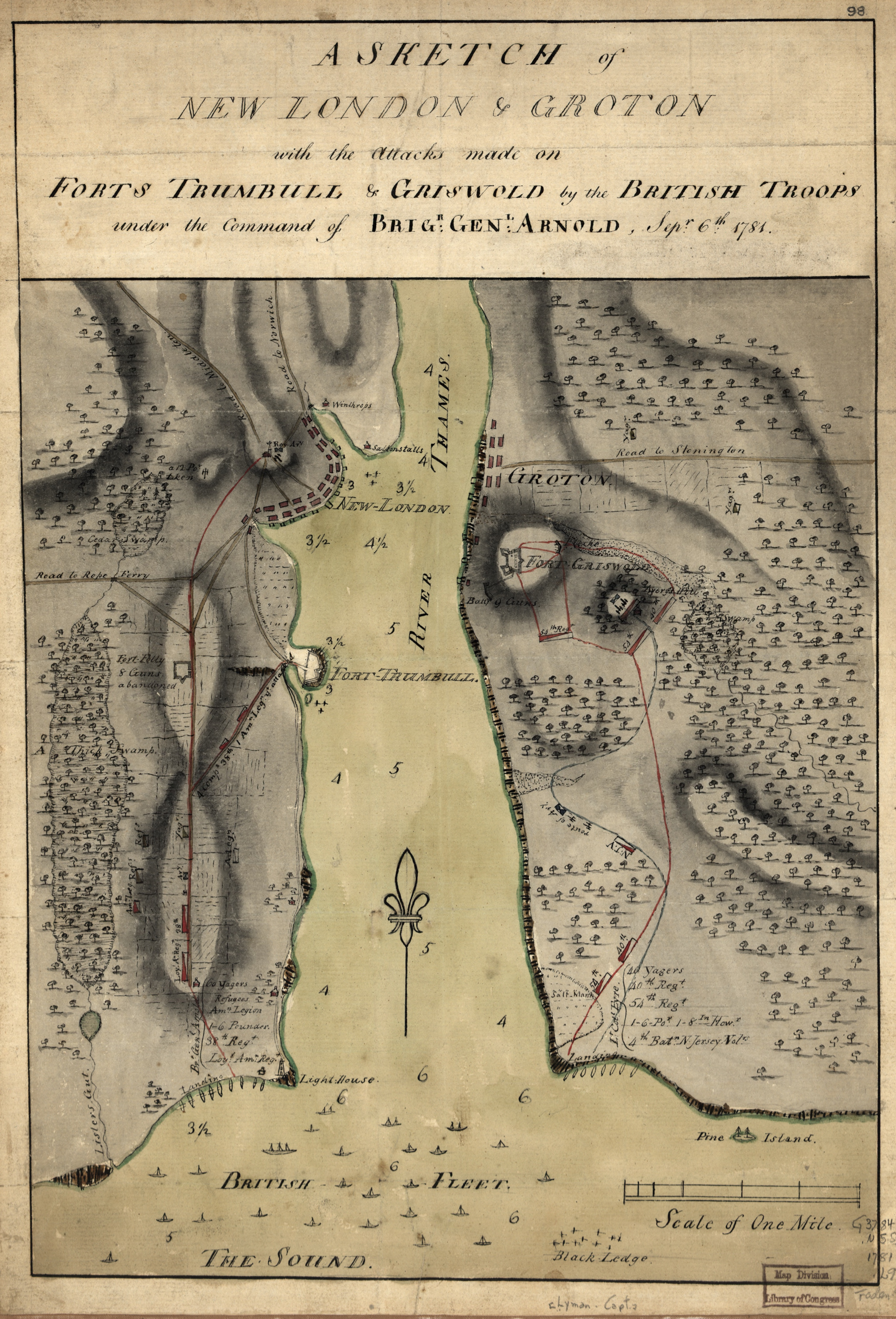
A 1781 map depicting the British military movements

At sunrise on September 6, the British landed on both sides of the mouth of the Thames River. The people of the town could do nothing but evacuate, and several ships in the harbor escaped upstream. The 800-man detachment that Arnold led in New London met with no resistance. The defenders of Fort Trumbull, 23 men led by Captain Shapley, fired a single volley, spiked the guns, and boarded boats to cross the river to Fort Griswold, following orders left by Colonel Ledyard. Seven of Shapley's men were wounded, and one of the boats was captured; the detachment that Arnold sent to take Fort Trumbull sustained four or five killed or wounded, according to Arnold's account. Arnold's troops continued into the town where they set about destroying stockpiles of goods and naval stores. Under the orders given, parts of the town were supposed to be spared, some of which was the property of those secretly loyal to the British, but at least one of the storehouses contained a large quantity of gunpowder, which Arnold evidently had not known. When it ignited, the resulting explosion set fire to the surrounding buildings. The fire was soon uncontrollable and 143 buildings were consumed by flames. Several ships in the harbor were able to escape upriver when the wind changed.

Meanwhile, Lieutenant Colonel Eyre's force of 800 men landed on the east side of the Thames River, but they were slowed by tangled woodlands and swamplands. The New Jersey Loyalists landed after the initial wave of regulars, also delayed by the difficulty in moving the artillery through rough conditions, and they did not participate in the assault.

The other division of troops landed on the east side of the river ... under the command of Col. Eyre and Major Montgomery. This division ... got to the terminus of the woods ... a little south of east on a direct line from the fort. Here the division halted, and Major Montgomery sent Captain Beckwith with a flag to the fort to demand its surrender. Colonel Ledyard ... sent a flag and met Beckwith ... The bearer of the American flag answered, "Colonel Ledyard will maintain the fort to the last extremity." Eyre sent a second parley flag, threatening to give no quarter if the militia did not surrender. Ledyard's response was as before, even though some of his subordinates argued that they should leave the fort and fight outside it.

Arnold ordered Eyre to assault the fort, believing that it would fall easily. However, upon reaching a prominence from which he could see its defenses, Arnold realized that the fort was more complete than anticipated and that taking it would not be easy. One of the reasons for taking the fort was to prevent the escape of boats upriver, and many had already passed beyond the fort; Arnold, therefore, attempted to recall Eyre, but the battle was joined a few minutes before the messenger arrived.

== Battle ==
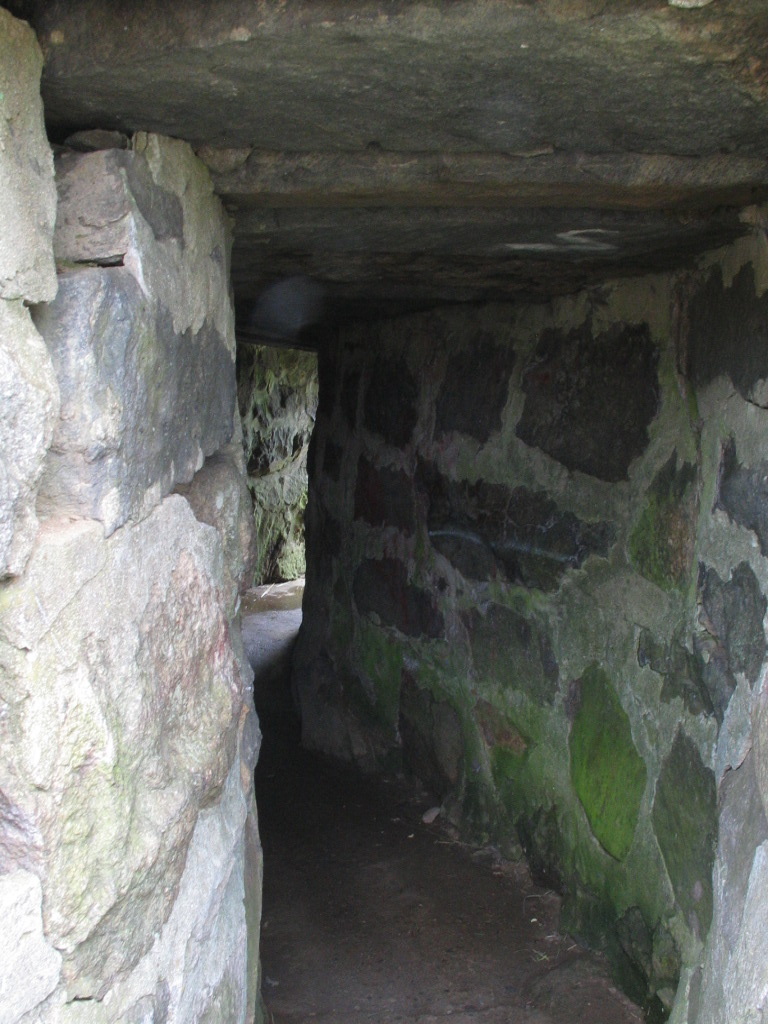
The fort's reconstructed sally-port which is located on the south wall.

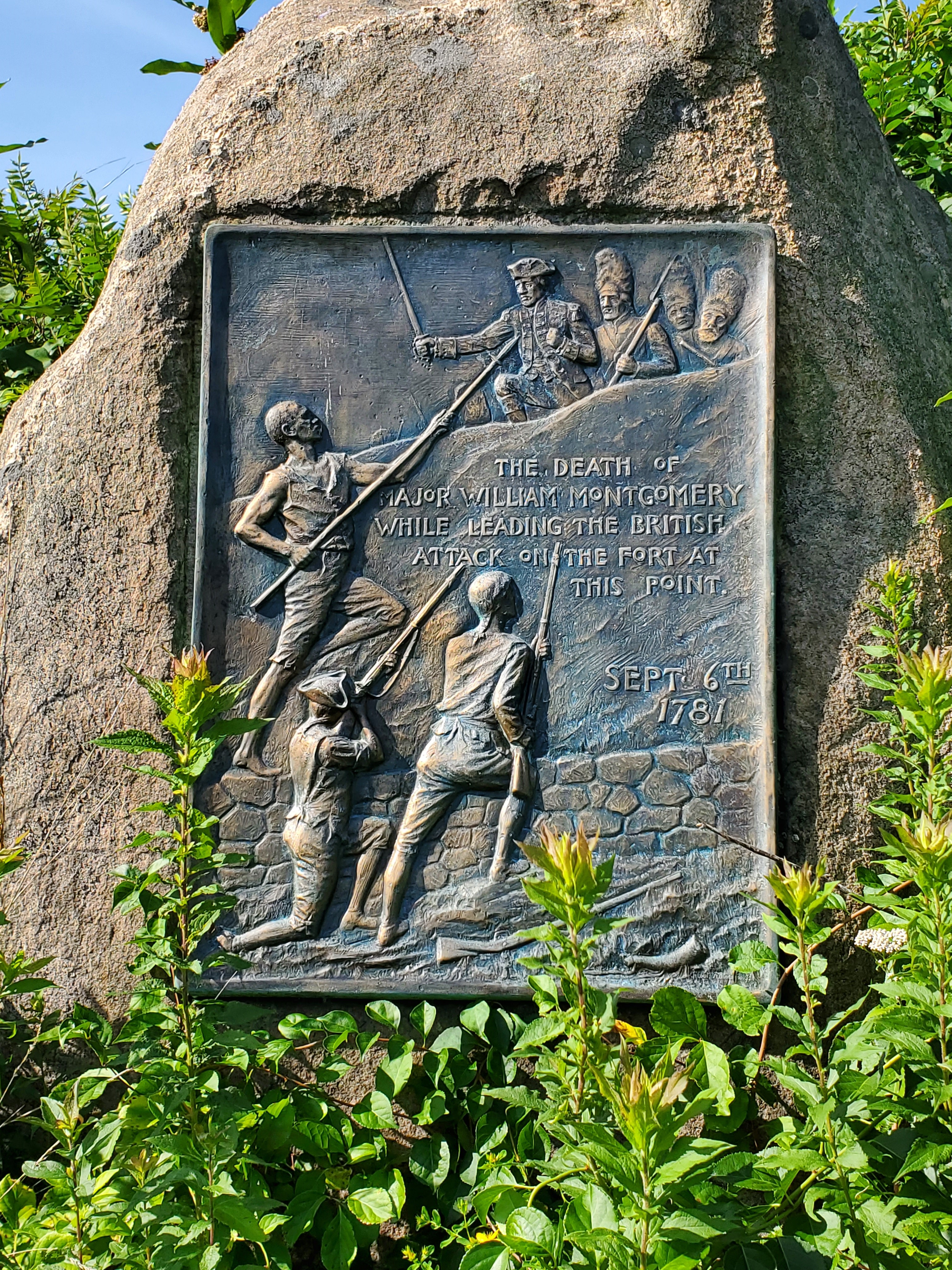
Plaque commemorating the death of British Major William Montgomery at Fort Griswold

On the return of the second parley flag, Eyre launched a full-scale assault upon the fort and its roughly 150 defenders. Sergeant Stephen Hempstead recounted, "When the answer to their demand had been returned ... the enemy were soon in motion, and marched with great rapidity, in a solid column ... they rushed furiously and simultaneously to the assault of the southwest bastion and the opposite sides." As the British neared the ditch, they were met by a bombardment of grapeshot that killed and wounded many. This briefly scattered them, but they reformed into two units. Eyre led one force against the southwest bastion, where American fire repulsed the assault, seriously wounding Eyre and several of his officers. (New London historian Frances Manwaring Caulkins asserted that Eyre was mortally wounded, while Benedict Arnold reported that Eyre survived.) Major William Montgomery led the second party to an abandoned redoubt just east of the fort. From there, they moved across the ditch and assaulted the ramparts. This unit gained the bastion against fierce resistance, but Montgomery was killed by the thrust of a 10-foot pike. Montgomery's men were finally able to open a gate from inside, and the British force poured into the fort. Ledyard ordered a cease fire and prepared to surrender it to the British.

What happened next is controversial. The most detailed accounts of the event are from American sources and are fairly consistent in what they describe. According to these accounts, the attackers continued to fire on the Americans despite Ledyard's attempts to surrender, and they killed and seriously wounded most of the remaining garrison inside the fort. Rufus Avery wrote in his account, "I believe there was not less than five or six hundred men of the enemy on the parade in the fort. They killed and wounded nearly every man in the fort as quick as they could."

Most contemporaneous accounts state that Captain Stephen Bromfield assumed command after Montgomery was killed, and that it was he who killed Ledyard, running him through with Ledyard's own sword when he surrendered. Randall's assessment is that Ledyard offered his sword to "Van Buskirk just as British soldiers ran up and bayonetted him." A Black soldier named Lambert Latham is credited with killing the officer who killed Ledyard. Stephen Hempstead recalled the scene in the aftermath: "Never was a scene of more brutal wanton carnage witnessed than now took place. The enemy were still firing upon us ... they discovered they were in danger of being blown up." Rufus Avery believed that the attack was called off due to the chance that further musket fire might set off the fort's powder magazine. The British left a burning powder trail to destroy Fort Griswold's magazine, but a militiaman entered the fort and extinguished the fire.

British descriptions of the battle ascribe several possible reasons for their behavior. During the battle, the fort's flag was allegedly shot down. Many of the British attackers interpreted this as striking the colors, making a sign of surrender, despite Americans' assertions that they had immediately raised the flag once again. The British suffered significant casualties when they approached the fort openly, believing that the Americans would not shoot. Other accounts say that Americans in one part of the fort were unaware that Ledyard had surrendered, and continued to fight. Therefore, the British attackers also continued fighting, mistrusting those who attempted to surrender.

Early British historians generally did not report much beyond Arnold's report of the expedition, which was unexceptional. William Gordon, however, reported in his 1788 history of the war that the "Americans had not more than a half dozen killed" before the fort was stormed, and that "a severe execution took place after resistance ceased." He wrote, further, that Ledyard "presented him his sword" and was "immediately run through and killed", but did not mention the details which appear in later accounts. An Italian historian wrote in 1809, "The assailants massacred as well those who surrendered as those who resisted."

However, neither Rufus Avery nor Stephen Hempstead saw the actual moment of Ledyard's death. Avery said that Ledyard "was about six feet from them when I turned my eyes off from him, and went up to the door of the barracks" and "It was but a moment that I had turned my eyes from Col. L. and saw him alive, and now I saw him weltering in his gore!" Hempstead said, "I turned suddenly round ... crushed me to the ground. The first person I saw afterwards, was my brave commander, a corpse by my side, having been run through the body with his own sword".

== Aftermath ==
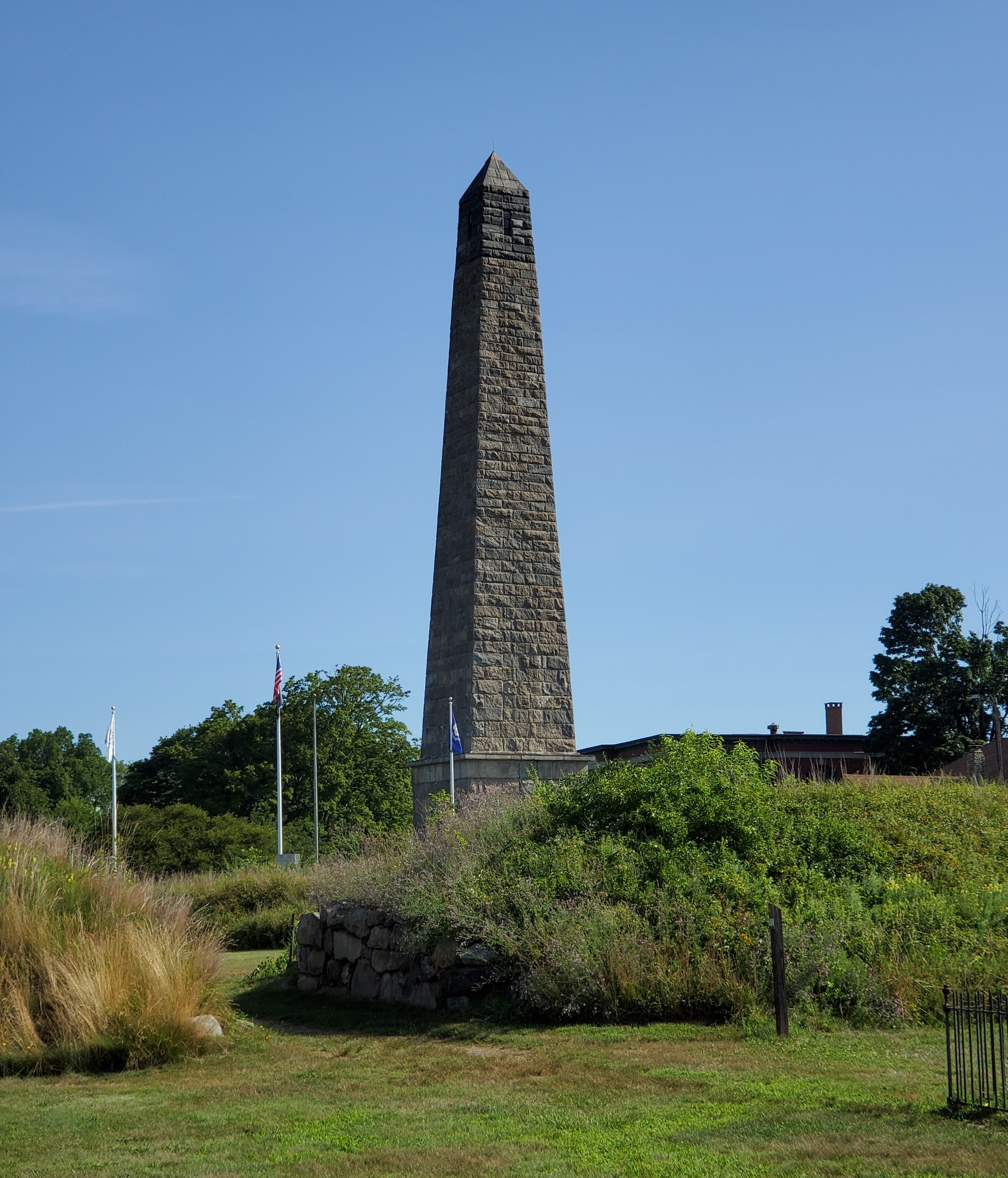
The Groton Monument and national historic site is set on the place of battle

The casualties and losses at Fort Griswold marked one of the greatest in the history of Groton and Connecticut, and was one of the last British victories in North America before the end of the war. The battle left nearly 100 families homeless and destroyed nine public buildings and much of the town's waterfront. The state identified losses in 1792 that totaled more than £61,000, or $200,000 Continental dollars. Some who lost homes or property were awarded land in the Western Reserve.

The fighting at Fort Griswold left dozens of Americans dead. The Groton Gazette reported that casualties numbered about 150. Some survivors escaped, such as George Middleton, but others were taken prisoner, including Stephen Hempstead. He stated, "After the massacre, they plundered us of everything we had, and left us literally naked." Hempstead was among the wounded and reported how he was placed on a wagon with others to be taken down to the fleet. The wagon was allowed to run down the hill, where it stopped when it struck a tree, throwing some of the men off the wagon and aggravating their injuries. Arnold reported that 85 men "were found dead in Fort Griswold, and sixty wounded, most of them mortally."

Arnold later issued a report stating that 48 British soldiers were killed and 145 wounded. Clinton praised Arnold for his "spirited conduct", but also complained about the high casualty rate; about 25 percent of the troops sent against Fort Griswold were killed or wounded. One British observer wrote that it had been like "a Bunker Hill expedition", and many British soldiers blamed Arnold for the events at Fort Griswold, even though he had not been in a position to intervene. Arnold next proposed a raiding expedition against Philadelphia, but the surrender of Lieutenant General Charles Cornwallis at Yorktown in late October ended that idea.

== Legacy ==
Fort Trumbull was extensively modified in the 19th century, and both it and Fort Griswold are now preserved in state parks. The Fort Griswold park also includes the Groton Monument, erected in the 1820s to commemorate the battle. Both forts are listed on the National Register of Historic Places.

There is a plaque on the main gate at Fort Griswold listing the fort's defenders and their fates.

== Order of battle ==
=== American ===
Department of New London, Groton, &c.: Lieut. Colonel William Ledyard

- Captain William Latham's Company of Matrosses: Capt. William Latham (w)
- Captain Adam Shapley's Company of Matrosses: Capt. Adam Shapley (w)

8th Regiment of Connecticut Militia:

- 1st 'Groton' Company: Capt. John Williams (k)
- 2nd 'Groton' Company: Capt. Simeon Allyn (k)
- 3rd 'Groton' Company (detachment): Sgt. Daniel Eldridge (w)
- 4th 'Stonington' Company (detachment)
- 5th 'Stonington' Company (detachment): Sgt. Daniel Stanton (k)
- 1st Company 'Groton Alarm List': Capt. Elijah Avery (k)
- 2nd Company 'Groton Alarm List': Capt. Samuel Allyn (k)
- 3rd Company, 'Groton Alarm List' (detachment): Sgt. John Stedman (k)
- Lieut. William Starr

3rd Regiment of Connecticut Militia (detachment): Ens. Japhet Mason

Sailors:

- Hancock: Capt. Peter Richards
- Deane
- Minerva

According to a plaque at the gate to Fort Griswold, American casualties were as follows: 85 killed, 35 wounded and paroled, 28 taken prisoner, 13 escaped, 1 captured and released (10 year old William Latham Jr.). Total: 162.

=== British ===
Operating on the New London side (west bank of the Thames River) (approximately 900 total soldiers)

Brig. General Benedict Arnold

- 60 Hessian Jägers: Capt. Friedrich Adam Julius von Wangenheim
- Associated Loyalists: Lieut. Colonel Joshua Upham
- Loyal Refugees: Lieut. William Castles
- American Legion: Capt. Nathan Frink
- 38th Regiment of Foot: Capt. Mathew Millet
- Loyal American Regiment: Lieut. Colonel Beverly Robinson Jr.
- Royal Artillery (one 6-pounder field gun): 1st Lieut. William H. Horndon

Operating on the Groton side (east bank of the Thames River) (approximately 800 total soldiers)

Lt. Colonel Edmund Eyre (w), Maj. William Montgomery (k), Maj. Stephen Bromfield

- 40 Hessian Jägers: Commander unknown
- 40th Regiment of Foot: Maj. William Montgomery (k), Capt. John Erasmus Adlam
- 54th Regiment of Foot: Lieut. Colonel Edmund Eyre (w), Maj. Stephen Bromfield
- 3rd Battalion, New Jersey Volunteers: Lieut. Colonel Abraham van Buskirk
- Royal Artillery (one 6-pounder field gun and one 8-inch howitzer): Capt. John Lemoine

British casualties were officially reported as 48 killed and 145 wounded.

== Gallery ==
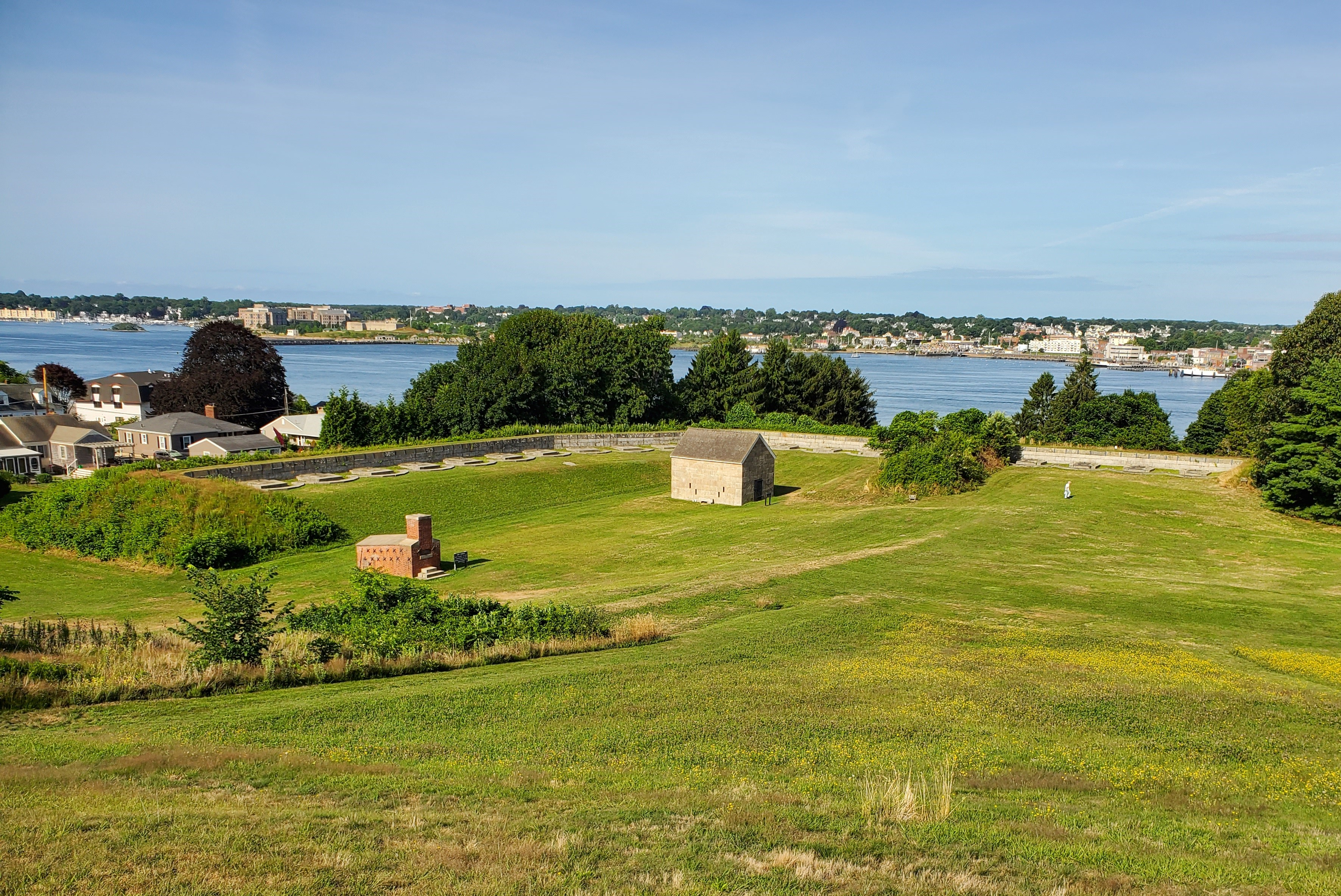
Overlooking the Thames River, July 2020.

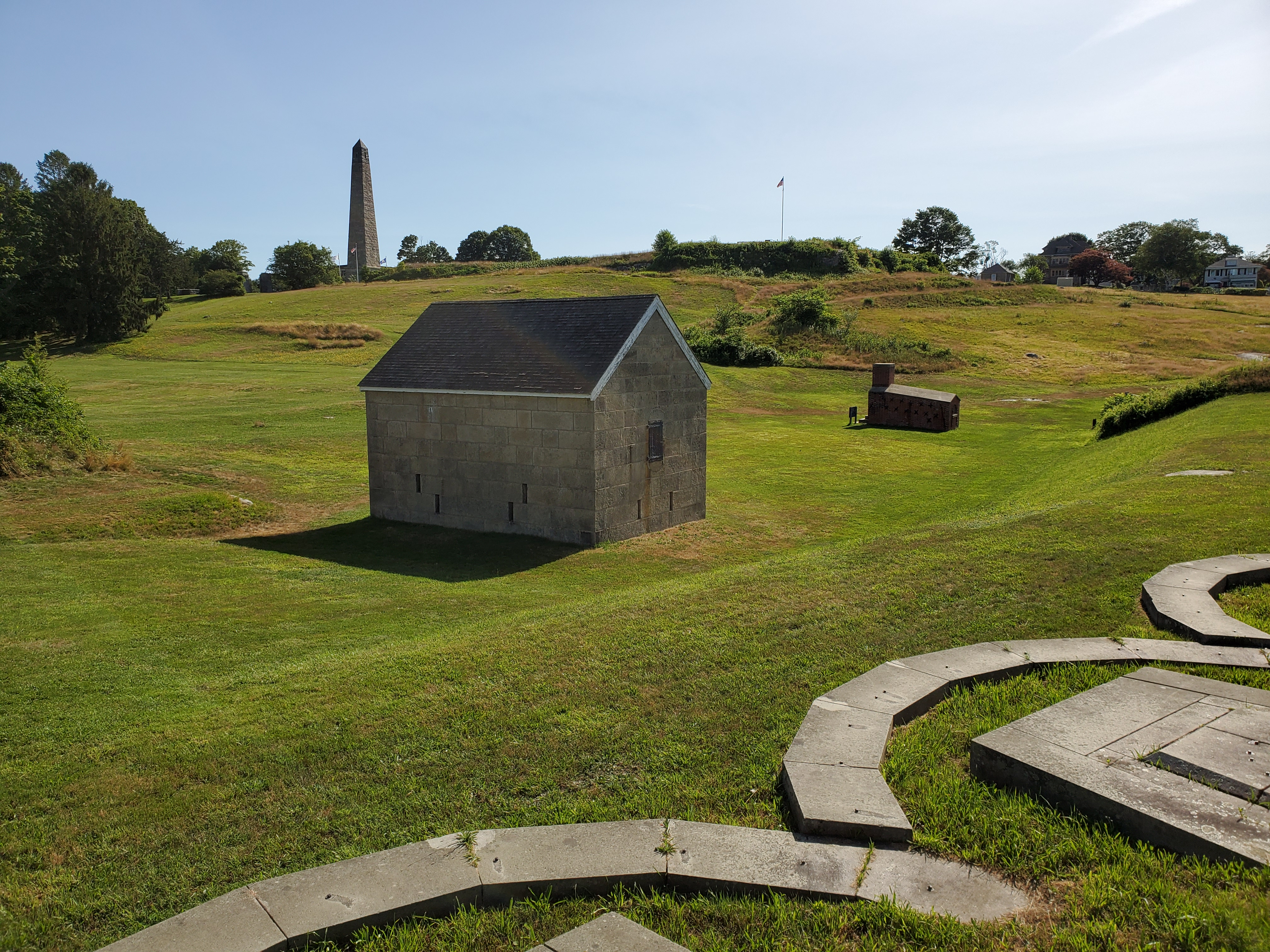
Looking towards the Groton Monument. The 19th century magazine is the foreground, July 2020.

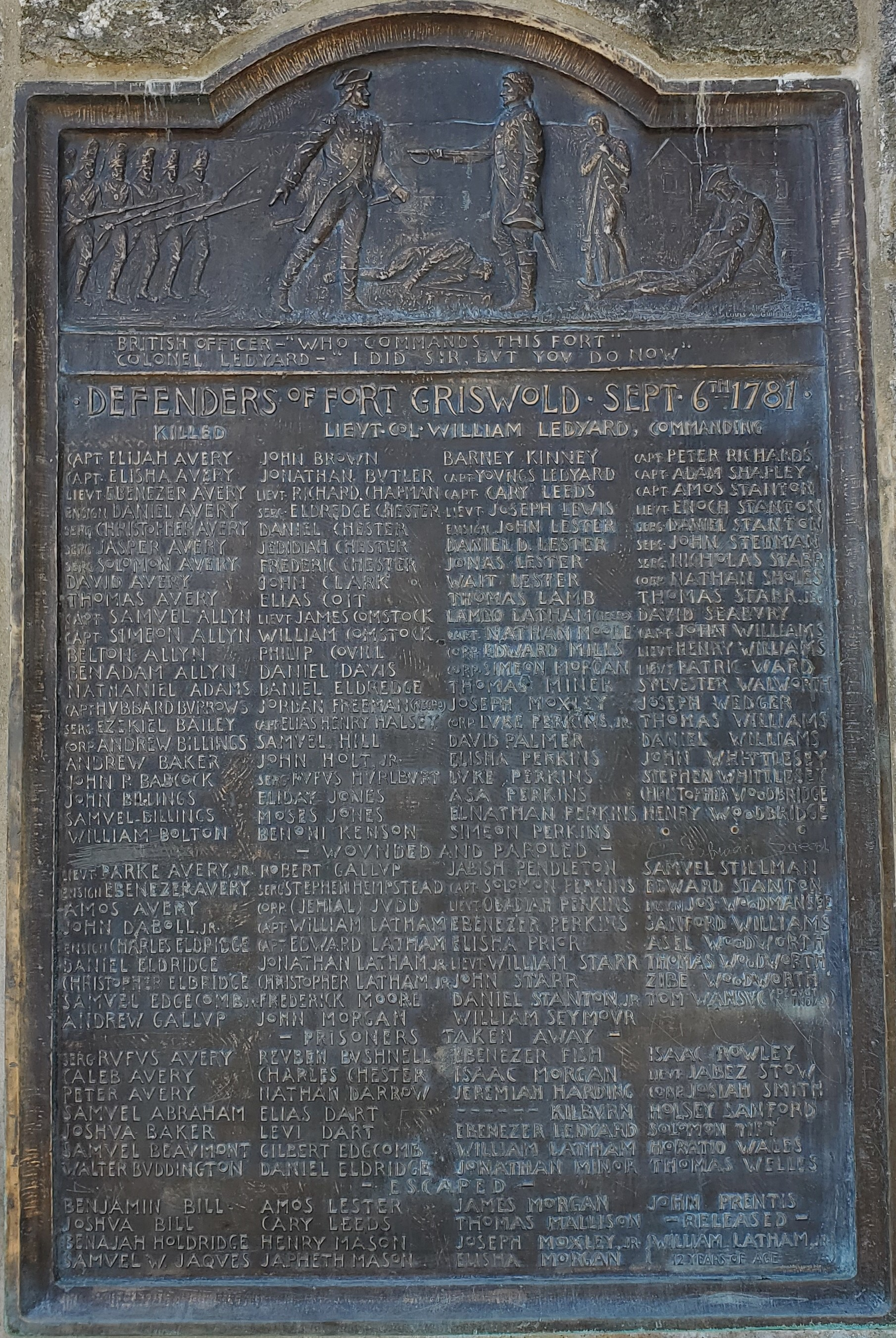
Plaque to the American dead at Fort Griswold.

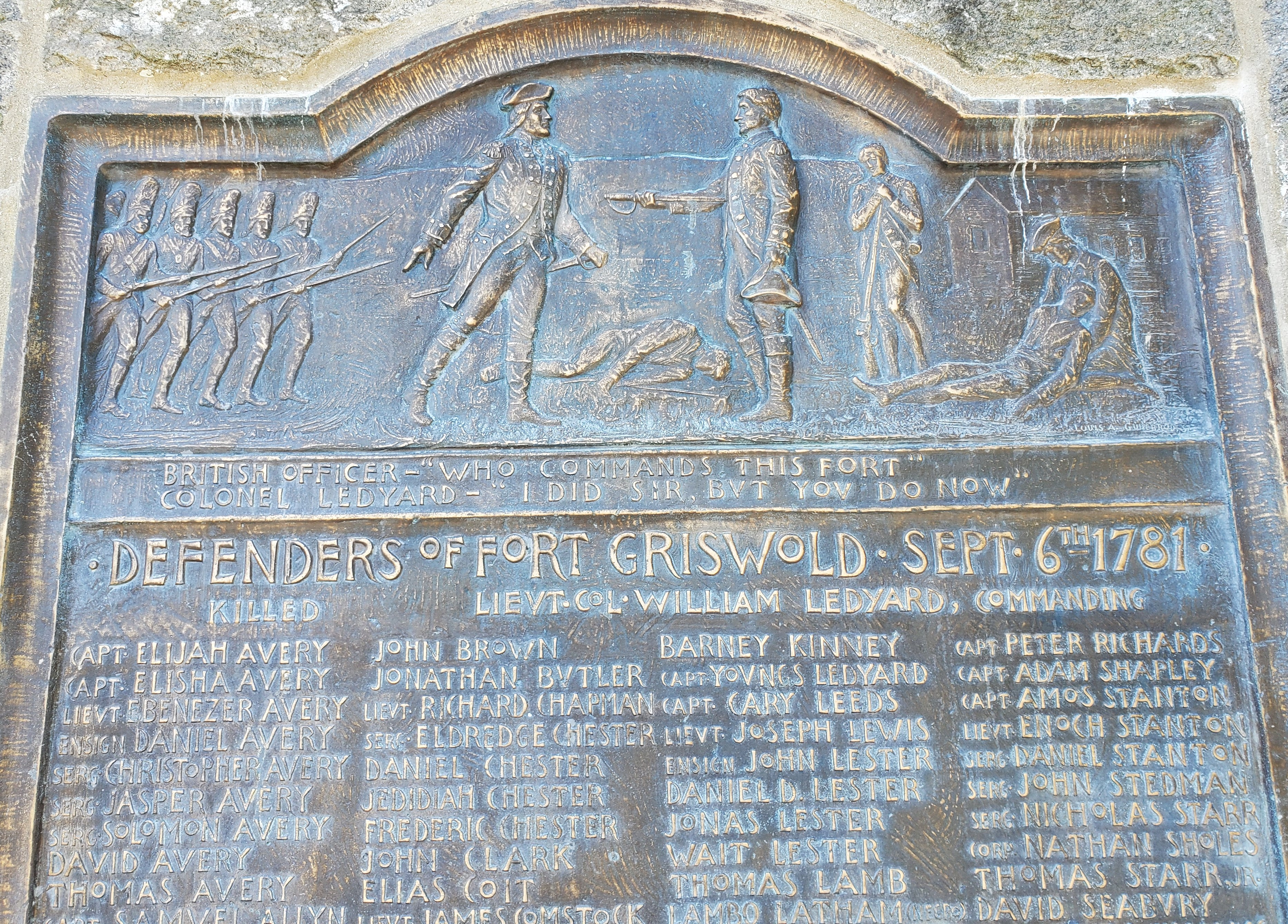
Detail from the memorial plaque depicting Ledyard's surrender.

== See also ==
- Military career of Benedict Arnold, 1781
