= William Ledyard =

American military officer (1738–1781)

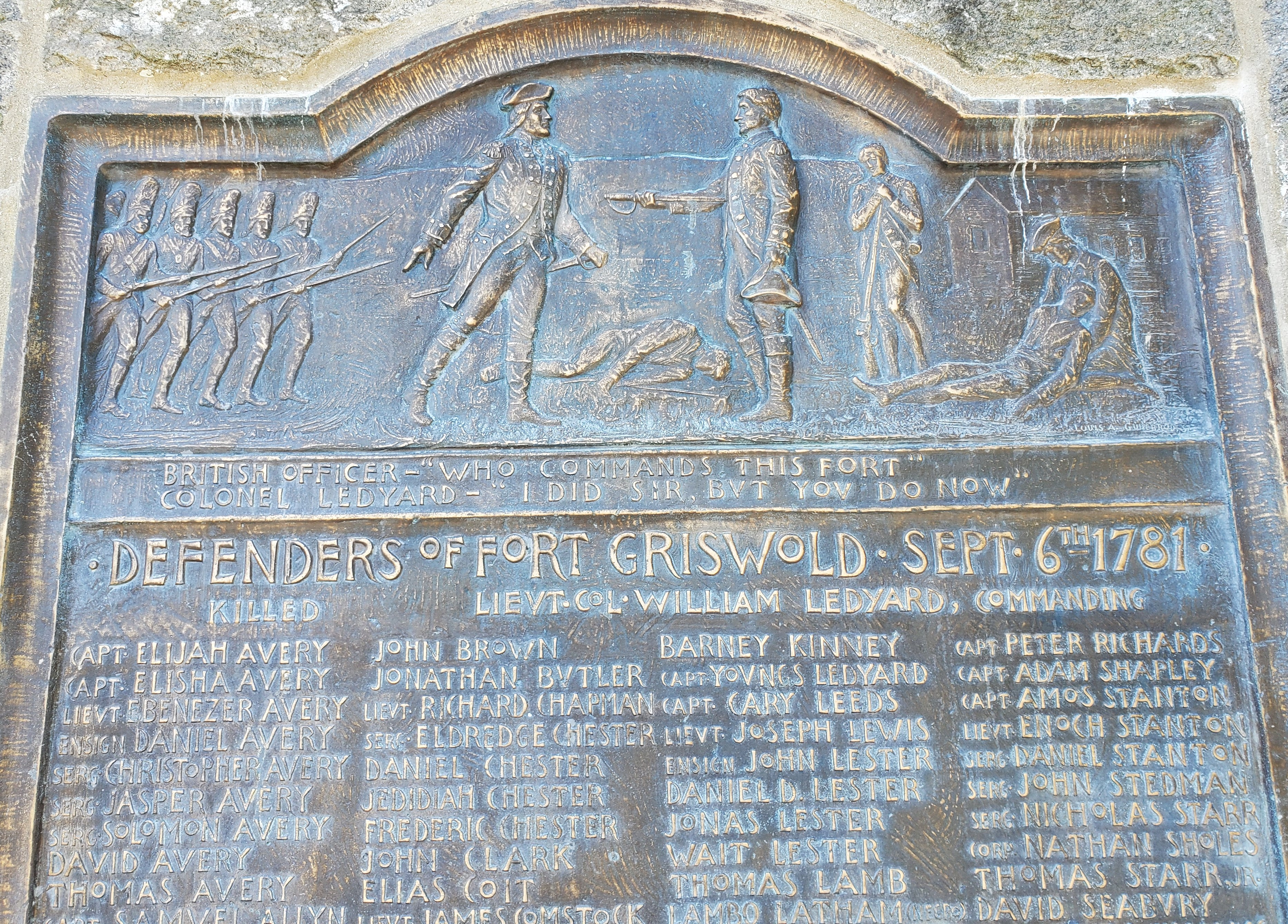
- Depiction of Ledyard on a memorial plaque at Fort Griswold
- Born: December 6, 1738; Groton, Connecticut, U.S.
- Died: September 6, 1781 (aged 42); Groton, Connecticut, U.S.
- Spouse: Deborah Ledyard
- Relatives: John Ledyard (father)
- Military career
- Allegiance: United States
- Branch: Connecticut Militia
- Rank: Lieutenant-Colonel
- Commands: Fort Griswold
- Conflicts: American Revolutionary War; Battle of Groton Heights †

Lieutenant-Colonel William Ledyard (December 6, 1738 – September 6, 1781) was an American military officer, who served in the Connecticut Militia in the Revolutionary War. During the conflict, he commanded Fort Griswold in Groton, Connecticut, which was attacked by British forces led by Benedict Arnold. In the battle, the fort was captured by the British. Ledyard surrendered his sword to Loyalist officer Major Stephen Bromfield, who immediately killed him with it. In 2023, author John Steward gave a presentation on him at the Bill Memorial Library in Groton.

== Early life ==
Ledyard was the son of John Ledyard, Esquire (1701–1771) and his wife Deborah who had come from England to the United States. His parents lived their later years in Hartford, Connecticut.

== Fort Griswold ==
Ledyard was in command of Fort Trumbull and Fort Griswold on September 6, 1781, when Fort Griswold was captured by British forces under Benedict Arnold in the Battle of Groton Heights. Ledyard had refused a demand to surrender the fort, and he led the garrison in defending against a British force of 800 men under Lieutenant-Colonel Eyre, with 157 hastily collected and poorly armed militia inside Fort Griswold, according to accounts of the battle. This attack was made on three sides; there was a battery between the fort and the river, but the Americans could spare no men to work it.

The British made their way into the fosse and scaled the works in the face of severe fire from the garrison. Eyre was wounded and died 12 hours later on shipboard, and his successor Major Montgomery was killed while mounting the parapet. The command passed to Major Stephen Bromfield, who effected an entrance into the fort after nearly 200 of his men had become casualties, including 48 killed, the defenders having lost only about 12 men. The British then stormed the fort, and Ledyard ordered his men to cease firing and to lay down their arms. Bromfield demanded to know who commanded the fort. Ledyard replied, "I did, sir, but you do now," and offered his sword. "According to the generally received tradition, Bromfield immediately plunged the weapon to the hilt in the body of Ledyard, killing him instantly." During the final stages of the battle, Arnold's men showed no quarter to the surrendering American troops.

Arnold wrote the following account of the battle in a dispatch to Henry Clinton two days afterward: "I have inclosed a return of the killed and wounded, by which your excellency will observe that our loss, though very considerable, is short of the enemy's, who lost most of their officers, among whom was their commander, Col. Ledyard. Eighty-five men were found dead in Fort Griswold, and sixty wounded, most of them mortally. Their loss on the opposite side (New London) must have been considerable, but cannot be ascertained."

Colonel Ledyard is buried in the Colonel Ledyard Cemetery in Groton.

== Legacy ==
The town of Ledyard, Connecticut, is named for Colonel Ledyard. The town's high school football team is called the Ledyard Colonels, and a road in the town of Ledyard is named Colonel Ledyard Highway.

William Ledyard's nephew was noted explorer John Ledyard. The events of Fort Griswold and the subsequent death of Ledyard was depicted in Turn: Washington's Spies Season 4, Episode 10.
