= Fort Griswold =

State park in New London County, Connecticut

Fort Griswold Battlefield State Park
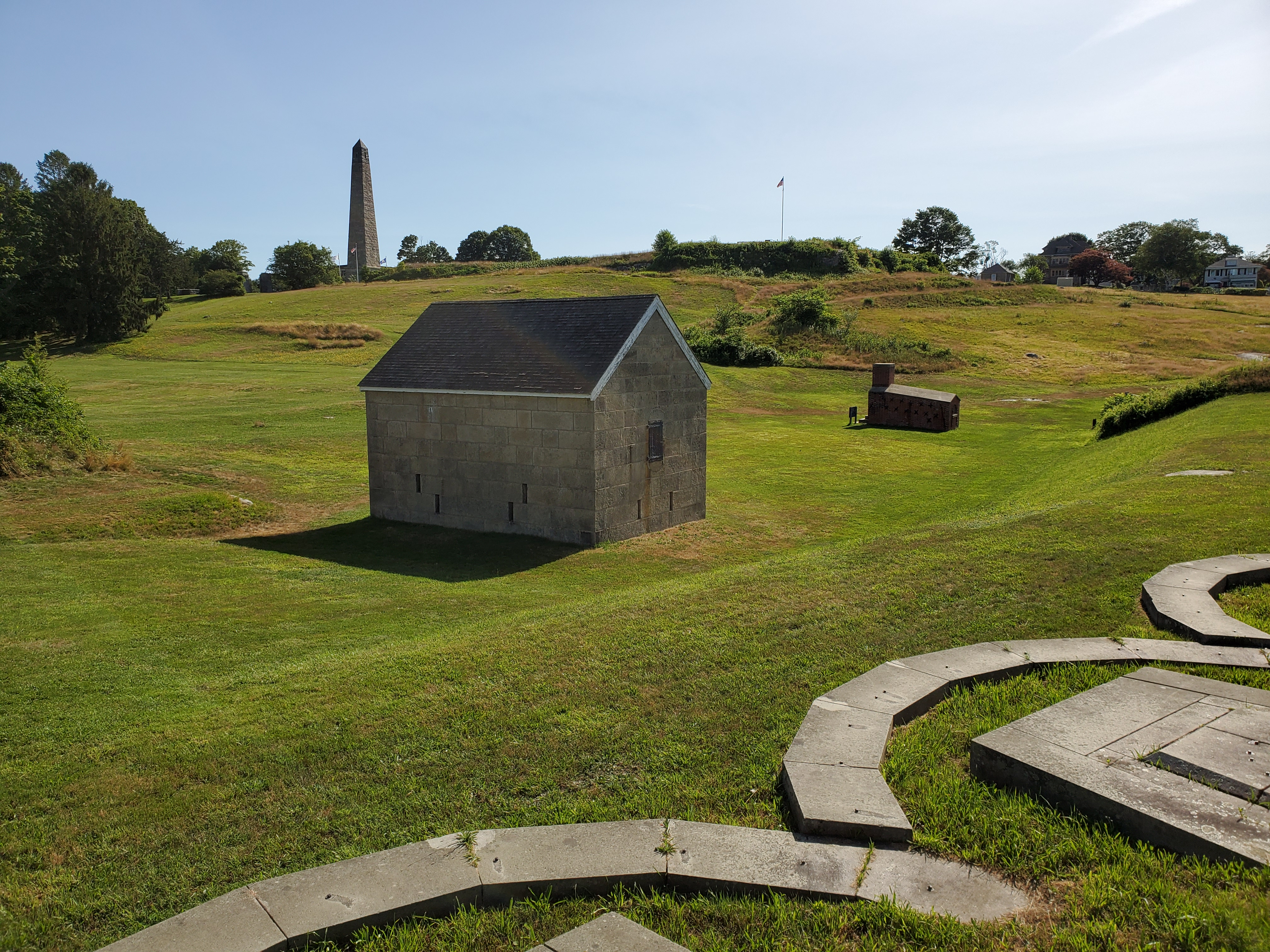
- Lower battery of Fort Griswold

- Location within Connecticut Location within the United States
- Location: Groton, Connecticut, United States
- Coordinates: 41°21′12″N 72°04′49″W
- Area: 17 acres (6.9 ha)
- Elevation: 98 ft (30 m)
- Established: 1953
- Administrator: Connecticut Department of Energy and Environmental Protection
- Designation: Connecticut state park
- Website: Official website
- Fort Griswold
- U.S. National Register of Historic Places
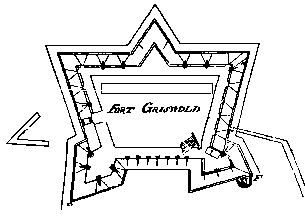
- Classical drawing of Fort Griswold
- Location: Bounded by Baker Avenue, Smith Street, Park Avenue, Monument Avenue, and Thames River; Groton, Connecticut
- NRHP reference No.: 70000694
- Added to NRHP: October 6, 1970

Fort Griswold is a former American defensive fortification in Groton, Connecticut named after Deputy Governor Matthew Griswold. The fort played a key role in the early stages of the American Revolutionary War, in correspondence with Fort Trumbull on the opposite side of the Thames River. Griswold defended the port of New London, Connecticut, a supply center for the Continental Army and friendly port for Connecticut-based privateers who targeted British shipping. The site is maintained as Fort Griswold Battlefield State Park by the Connecticut Department of Energy and Environmental Protection.

== History ==
Construction of the fort was begun on December 5, 1775 in response to the outbreak of the American Revolutionary War. It was completed in 1778 and was also called Groton Fort. It is located on a hill with the ability to bombard ships entering the Thames River. About 100 feet below the main fort is a battery for additional guns which was built during the Revolutionary War and improved in the late 19th century.

In September 1781, British forces under Benedict Arnold successfully captured Fort Griswold. The British were well informed of the layout of Fort Griswold, and Arnold approached the river from such an angle that its guns could not engage his ships. Arnold's forces split up, some to burn New London and the rest to attack the fort in the Battle of Groton Heights. The British eventually overran the American defenders, and Lieutenant-Colonel William Ledyard surrendered by handing his sword hilt-first to Loyalist officer Major Bromfield, who took it and thrust it through Ledyard. Arnold abandoned the fort soon after, and American forces eventually retook possession of it.

=== Later use ===
The fort was rebuilt and manned in several other conflicts, but the Battle of Groton Heights was its most prominent use. It was used during the War of 1812 by sailors commanded by Commodore Stephen Decatur when Decatur's three-ship squadron was blockaded by a larger Royal Navy force in 1814. In the 1840s, the fort's lower battery was rebuilt for 20 guns, initially 32-pounder and 24-pounder cannons.

After the American Civil War, the lower battery was redesigned to mount 10-inch Rodman guns. It was a sub-post of Fort Trumbull for most of its use by the Army, although it was never actively garrisoned after the Civil War and had an ordnance sergeant as caretaker. It was in the care of Ordnance Sergeant Mark Wentworth Smith from 1863 to 1879, a Mexican–American War veteran who was wounded at the Battle of Chapultepec. Sergeant Smith died in 1879 at age 76, the oldest active duty enlisted soldier in the history of the Army. Fort Griswold became obsolete after the Spanish–American War, when Fort H. G. Wright was completed in 1906 on Fishers Island as part of the Harbor Defenses of Long Island Sound.

=== State park ===
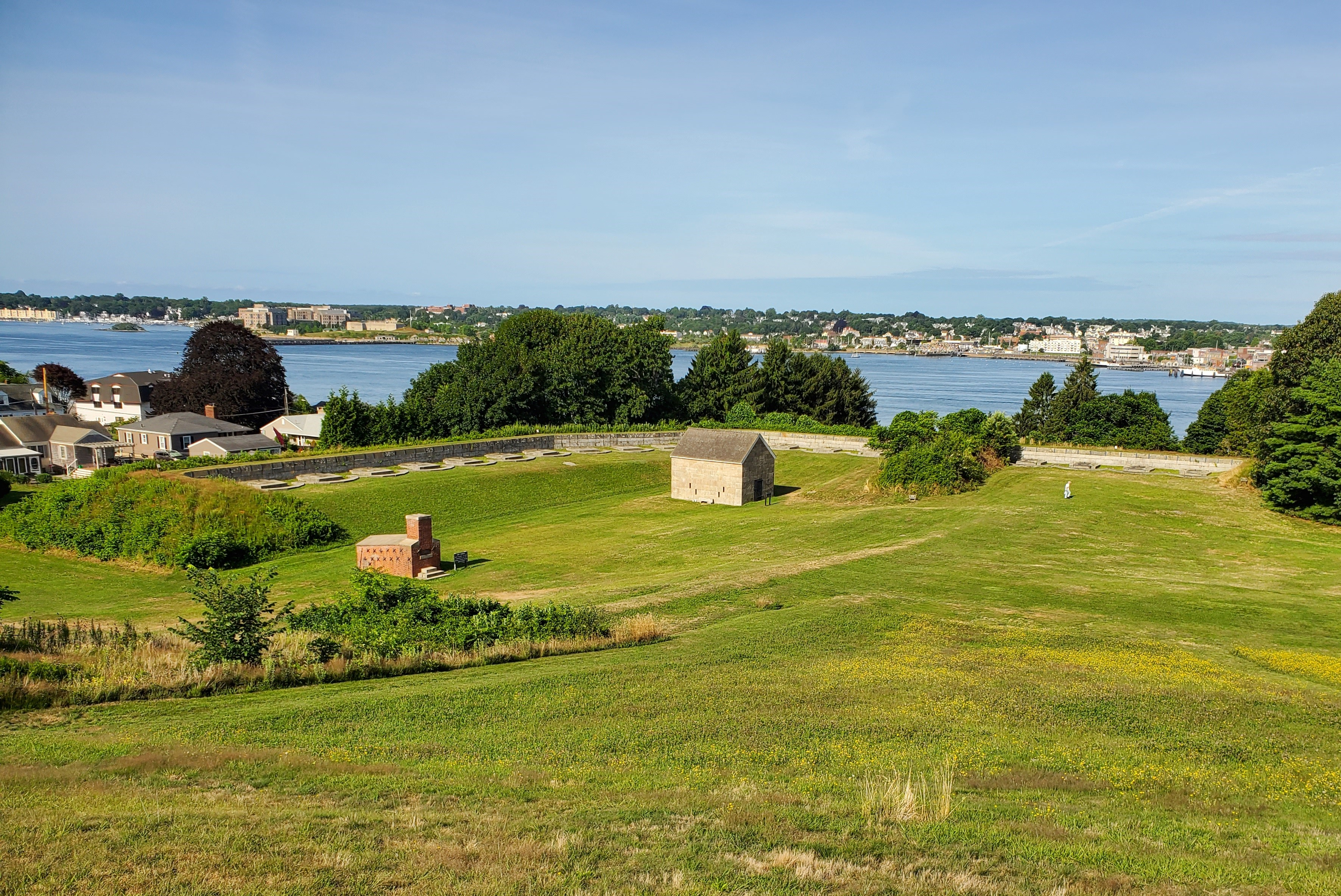
Lower Battery of Fort Griswold, 16 July 2020

The State of Connecticut has owned and operated the site as Fort Griswold Battlefield State Park since 1953. This includes the restored earthwork battery, cannons, and a shot furnace and powder magazine. The grounds include several monuments and memorials to state residents who fought in different wars:

- The Groton Monument is a granite obelisk dedicated to the defenders who fell during the Battle of Groton Heights. It was built between 1826 and 1830 and stands 135 feet (41 m) tall with 166 steps.
- The adjacent Monument House Museum features exhibits about the Revolutionary War and is operated by the Daughters of the American Revolution. Visitors can climb the monument and visit the museum from Memorial Day through Labor Day.
- The Ebenezer Avery House sheltered the wounded after the Battle of Groton Heights. It is a Revolutionary-period historic house museum that is open for tours on summer weekends.

== See also ==
- National Register of Historic Places listings in New London County, Connecticut
