= List of presidential trips made by Ronald Reagan (1982) =

Wikimedia list article

This is a list of presidential trips made by Ronald Reagan during 1982, the second year of his presidency as the 40th president of the United States. International trips are highlighted in blue.

This list excludes trips made within Washington, D.C., the U.S. federal capital in which the White House, the official residence and principal workplace of the president, is located. It also excludes the capital's immediate surroundings in Maryland and Virginia, such as Andrews Air Force Base in Maryland, where the president typically boards Air Force One for all trips outside the area. Also excluded are trips to Camp David, the country residence of the president, and to Reagan's Rancho del Cielo ranch in Santa Barbara County, California.

== January ==
State or country	Areas visited	Dates	Details
California	Palm Springs	January 1–3	Stayed at Sunnylands. Visited the home of Justin Whitlock Dart Sr. and the El Dorado Country Club.
New York	New York	January 14	Attended a Partnership for New York City luncheon at the Waldorf Astoria New York.

== February ==
State or country	Areas visited	Dates	Details
Minnesota	Bloomington	February 8	Campaigned for Senator David Durenberger at the Carlton Celebrity Dinner Theater.
Iowa	Des Moines	February 8–9	Stayed at the Des Moines Marriott Hotel. Addressed a joint session of the Iowa General Assembly at the State Capitol.
Indiana	Indianapolis	February 9	Addressed a joint session of the Indiana General Assembly at the State Capitol.

== March ==
State or country	Areas visited	Dates	Details
Wyoming	Cheyenne	March 2	Campaigned for Senator Malcolm Wallop at the Storey Gymnasium and the Hitching Post Inn.
New Mexico	Albuquerque	March 2	Campaigned for Senator Harrison Schmitt at the Kiva Auditorium.
California	Los Angeles	March 2–4	Stayed at the Century Plaza Hotel. Met with the Los Angeles County Board of Supervisors at the Los Angeles Music Center. Visited the home of William A. Wilson.
California	Santa Ynez	March 7	Hosted an episode of the PBS series Young Artists in Performance at the White House at Rancho Sierra Grande.
Alabama	Montgomery	March 15	Addressed a joint session of the Alabama Legislature at the State House. Attended a Republican reception at the Montgomery Civic Center.
Tennessee	Nashville	March 15	Observed the 215th anniversary of the birth of former president Andrew Jackson at his plantation, The Hermitage. Addressed a joint session of the Tennessee General Assembly at the State Capitol. Attended a Republican reception at the Radisson hotel.
Oklahoma	Oklahoma City	March 15–16	Stayed at the Shirvin Plaza Hotel. Addressed a joint session of the Oklahoma Legislature at the State Capitol.
Indiana	Fort Wayne	March 16	Toured damage from the ongoing flooding of the St. Marys River.
New York	New York	March 23	Addressed the National Conference of Christians and Jews annual dinner at the New York Hilton Midtown, and was presented with the Charles Evans Hughes Gold Medal. Interviewed by the New York Post editorial board at the hotel.

== April ==
State or country	Areas visited	Dates	Details
Jamaica	Kingston	April 7–8	Met with Prime Minister Edward Seaga.
Barbados	Bridgetown	April 8–11	Met with the prime ministers of Barbados, Dominica, Antigua and Barbuda, St. Christopher and Nevis, and St. Vincent and the Grenadines.
Illinois	Chicago, Geneva	April 15	Addressed the National Catholic Educational Association at the Arie Crown Theater. Visited St. Peter's Catholic School in Geneva.

== May ==
State or country	Areas visited	Dates	Details
Tennessee	Knoxville, Huntsville	May 1–2	Officially opened the 1982 World's Fair and visited the fair's U.S. Pavilion. Campaigned for Representative Robin Beard at the Hyatt Regency hotel. Stayed at the home of Senator Howard Baker in Huntsville and attended service with him at Huntsville Presbyterian Church.
Illinois	Eureka, Peoria, Chicago	May 9–10	Gave the commencement address at Eureka College, from which he graduated in 1932. Attended his 50th class reunion at the Continental Regency Hotel in Peoria. Stayed at The Conrad Hilton, where he addressed a YMCA of Metropolitan Chicago luncheon. Visited Providence St. Mel School.
Pennsylvania	Philadelphia	May 14	Attended a fundraising luncheon for Governor Dick Thornburgh at The Bellevue-Stratford Hotel, and one for Senator John Heinz at the Franklin Plaza Hotel.
Virginia	Winchester	May 19	Went horseback riding with King Hassan II of Morocco at Fairfield Farm, a property owned by J. Willard Marriott.
California	Downey, Los Angeles	May 25	Toured the Rockwell International plant in Downey. Attended a "Salute to the President" dinner at the Century Plaza Hotel.
California	Santa Barbara	May 28	Attended the Mexico-United States Interparliamentary Conference at the Santa Barbara Biltmore.

== June ==
State or country	Areas visited	Dates	Details
France	Paris, Versailles	June 2–7	Attended the 8th G7 summit. Met with President François Mitterrand and Prime Minister Pierre Mauroy.
Italy	Rome	June 7	Met with President Sandro Pertini and Premier Giovanni Spadolini.
Vatican City	Apostolic Palace	June 7	Audience with Pope John Paul II.
United Kingdom	London, Windsor Castle	June 7–9	State visit. Met with Queen Elizabeth II and Prime Minister Margaret Thatcher. Addressed Parliament.
West Germany	Bonn, West Berlin	June 9–11	State visit. Met with Chancellor Helmut Schmidt and President Karl Carstens. Addressed the Bundestag and attended a meeting of the North Atlantic Council.
Texas	Houston	June 15–16	Attended a fundraising dinner for Governor Bill Clements at the Albert Thomas Convention Center. Stayed at the Hyatt Regency Houston Downtown.
New York	New York	June 17	Attended a special session of the United Nations General Assembly on disarmament. Met with delegates to the New York State Republican Convention at the Sheraton Centre Hotel & Towers.

== July ==
State or country	Areas visited	Dates	Details
California	Los Angeles	July 1	Met with news editors and broadcasters of the Western United States at the Century Plaza Hotel.
California	Kern County	July 4	Present at the landing of STS-4, the final orbital test flight of the Space Shuttle, at Edwards Air Force Base. With the success of this flight, Reagan declared the Shuttle officially operational.
California	Los Angeles, Beverly Hills	July 5–7	Stayed at the Century Plaza Hotel, where he discussed his New Federalism agenda with state and local officials. Discussed Social Security policy with seniors at the Angelus Plaza senior center. Met with Los Angeles Times editors at Times Mirror Square. Attended a birthday party for his wife Nancy Reagan at a private residence in Beverly Hills.
Maryland	Baltimore	July 13	Toured a youth training program at the Commercial Credit Company Building. Addressed the National Association of Counties convention at the Baltimore Convention Center. Attended a luncheon with local elected officials and businessmen at the Baltimore World Trade Center.
Missouri	St. Louis	July 22–23	Visited the Mathews-Dickey Boys' Club, where he presented the Presidential Citizens Medal to two directors of the local nonprofit. Attended a Eureka College fundraiser at the home of Roy Pfautch. Attended a United States Olympic Committee dinner at the Marriott Pavilion Hotel, where he presented the "Sportsman of the Year" award to August Busch III. Stayed at the Marriott Pavilion Hotel.

== August ==
State or country	Areas visited	Dates	Details
Iowa	Des Moines, State Center	August 2–3	Addressed the National Corn Growers Association convention at the Veterans Memorial Auditorium. Took questions from local farmers while visiting a family farm in State Center. Stayed at the Des Moines Marriott Hotel.
Connecticut	Hartford	August 3	Addressed the Supreme Council of the Knights of Columbus on the occasion of its 100th anniversary at the Sheraton Civic Center Plaza.
Montana	Billings	August 11	Spoke at a celebration of the centennial of Billings and Yellowstone County at METRA Arena. Campaigned for Larry R. Williams for Senate at the Sheraton Billings Hotel.
Arizona	Phoenix	August 20–21	Attended the funeral of his stepfather-in-law Loyal Davis at Greenwood Memorial Park. Stayed at the Davis home.
California	Los Angeles, Beverly Hills	August 23–25	Campaigned for San Diego mayor Pete Wilson for Senate at the Fox Studio Lot. Stayed at the Beverly Wilshire Hotel, where he campaigned for state attorney general George Deukmejian for governor.

== September ==
State or country	Areas visited	Dates	Details
California	Los Angeles	September 1	Gave a televised address to the nation on the war in Lebanon from KNBC studios.
Kansas	Manhattan, Topeka	September 9	Delivered a Landon Lecture at Kansas State University's Ahearn Field House. Attended a Republican fundraiser at the Topeka Ramada Inn Downtown.
Utah	Ogden, Hooper	September 9–10	Attended a summit of Western state Republican leaders at the Ogden Hilton, where he stayed. Toured a Church Welfare System cannery in Ogden. Inducted as an honorary member of the sheriff's posse of Weber County at Hooper Park.
New Jersey	Whitehouse Station, Flemington	September 17	Participated in a naturalization ceremony at Liberty Hall in Whitehouse Station, in observance of Constitution Day and Citizenship Day. Attended the San Gennaro Festival at the Hunterdon County Fairgrounds in Flemington.
Virginia	Richmond	September 29	Spoke at a Republican fundraiser at Richmond Arena. Campaigned for Representative Paul Trible for Senate at the Holiday Inn, where he also presented an Economic Development Administration Technical Assistance Grant to the Hampton Institute.

== October ==
State or country	Areas visited	Dates	Details
Ohio	Columbus	October 4	Toured the headquarters of AccuRay Corporation, which he presented with an "E Star" Award. Addressed a meeting of Ohio veterans' organizations, and campaigned for Representative Bud Brown for governor, at the Hyatt Regency Columbus.
Nevada	Reno, Las Vegas	October 7	Spoke at Republican campaign rallies at the University of Nevada quadrangle and Rancho San Rafael Regional Park. Attended a fundraiser for Chic Hecht for Senate at the home of Wayne Newton in Las Vegas.
California	Los Angeles	October 7–8	Attended a performance of the Joffrey Ballet at the home of David H. Murdock. Stayed at the Century Plaza Hotel.
Mexico	Tijuana	October 8	Visited Mexican president-elect Miguel de la Madrid, laying a wreath with him at a statue of Benito Juárez at Tijuana Government Center.
California	Coronado	October 8	Hosted Mexican president-elect Miguel de la Madrid at the Hotel del Coronado.
Texas	Irving	October 11	Spoke at a Republican campaign rally at Wild Briar Farm.
Illinois	Chapin, Peoria	October 20	Attended the 1982 Conservation Tillage Exposition on a family farm in Chapin. Spoke at a Republican campaign rally at the Continental Regency Hotel.
Nebraska	Omaha	October 20–21	Stayed at the Red Lion Inn. Spoke at a Republican campaign rally at Omaha Civic Auditorium.
North Carolina	Raleigh	October 26	Spoke at a Republican campaign rally at the Raleigh Civic Center, where he also presented the Presidential Medal of Freedom to Kate Smith.
Wyoming	Casper	October 28	Spoke at a Republican campaign rally at Natrona County International Airport.
Montana	Great Falls	October 28	Spoke at a Republican campaign rally at Charles M. Russell High School. Campaigned for Larry R. Williams for Senate at the Sheraton hotel.
Nevada	Las Vegas	October 28–29	Spoke at a Republican campaign rally at the Las Vegas Convention Center. Stayed at the Sands Hotel and Casino.
Utah	Salt Lake City	October 29	Spoke at a Republican campaign rally at the Salt Palace.
New Mexico	Roswell	October 29	Spoke at a Republican campaign rally at Roswell International Air Center.

== November ==
State or country	Areas visited	Dates	Details
Illinois	Chicago	November 13	Attended an American College of Surgeons memorial service for his stepfather-in-law, Loyal Davis, at the Murphy Memorial Auditorium and Nickerson House.
Louisiana	New Orleans	November 16	Addressed the United States League of Savings Associations convention at the Hilton New Orleans Riverside, where he also attended a fundraiser for Governor Dave Treen.
Florida	Miami	November 16–17	Stayed at the Omni Hotel. Met with members of the South Florida Task Force and Miami Citizens Against Crime while aboard the USCGC Dauntless at Coast Guard Station Miami, and at Homestead Air Force Base.
California	Los Angeles	November 29	Addressed the National League of Cities convention at the Los Angeles Convention Center.
Brazil	Brasília, São Paulo	November 30–December 3	Met with President João Figueiredo.

== December ==
State or country	Areas visited	Dates	Details
Colombia	Bogota	December 3	Met with President Belisario Betancur.
Costa Rica	San José	December 3–4	Met with President Luis Alberto Monge and President Álvaro Magaña of El Salvador.
Honduras	San Pedro Sula	December 4	Official working visit. Met with President Roberto Suazo Córdova and Guatemalan president Efraín Ríos Montt.
Arizona	Phoenix	December 27–28	Stayed at the home of his mother-in-law, Edith Luckett Davis.
California	Long Beach, Los Angeles, Palm Springs	December 28–31	Recommissioned the USS New Jersey in a ceremony at the Long Beach Naval Shipyard. Stayed at the Century Plaza Hotel and at Sunnylands. Visited a New Year's Eve party for White House correspondents at the Marriott Rancho Las Palmas Resort.
