= Local government in Connecticut =

System of local government

Connecticut shares with the five other New England states a governmental structure known as the New England town. From 1666 to 1960, Connecticut had a system of county governments, which each had limited powers given to it by the General Assembly. They were abolished by Public Act 152 in 1960. Connecticut also had a system of sheriffs' offices until October 2000, when those were also abolished.

== County ==
Connecticut is divided geographically into eight counties, but these counties do not have any associated government structure. The Connecticut General Assembly abolished all county governments on October 1, 1960. The counties continued to have sheriffs until 2000, when the sheriffs' offices were abolished and replaced with state marshals through a ballot measure attached to the 2000 presidential election. Today, counties serve as little more than boundaries for the state's judicial and state marshal system. Connecticut's court jurisdictions still adhere to the old county boundaries, although Fairfield, Hartford, and New Haven counties have been further subdivided into multiple court jurisdictions due to their relatively large populations.

From 1666 to 1960, "weak" county governments existed in Connecticut, where each county commission had limited powers delegated to it by the General Assembly. Each county had a 3-member County Commission, whose members were appointed by the General Assembly; plus a Sheriff who was elected by the voters in each county. Initially, county governments had authority over:

- County courts (transitioned to the State Judiciary in 1855)
- Construction and maintenance of county jails
- Resolving road disputes between towns
- Constructing and maintaining bridges to link adjacent towns
- Maintaining safe houses for neglected and/or abused children

County governments had no direct taxing authority; their funding was provided indirectly through set-asides from state and local taxes. During the first half of the 20th century, county governments were gradually phased out as the General Assembly transitioned powers from the county commissions to either the state government or to individual towns. By the time county governments were abolished by Public Act 152 in 1960, the only remaining responsibility of the county commissions was to oversee and maintain the county jails; those functions were transitioned to the state Department of Corrections or local police departments after the county commissions were disbanded.

== Councils of governments ==
In the 1980s the legislature established fifteen regional councils, which cluster towns with similar demographics into an administrative planning region, instead of adhering to the old county structure. In 2014 the number of planning regions was reduced from the original fifteen to nine, as a result of four voluntary consolidations and the elimination of two planning regions.

As of 2015, the State of Connecticut recognized COGs as county equivalents, allowing them to apply for funding and grants made available to county governments in other states. In 2019 the state recommended to the United States Census Bureau that the nine Councils of Governments replace counties for statistical purposes. This proposal was approved by the Census Bureau in 2022, and was fully implemented by 2024.

| Population | Council of governments (COG) | Metropolitan Planning Organization (MPO) |
|---|---|---|
| 973,959 | Capitol Region | (Same) |
| 318,004 | CT Metropolitan | Greater Bridgeport and Valley MPO |
| 175,685 | Lower CT River Valley | (Same) |
| 448,738 | Naugatuck Valley | Central Naugatuck MPO |
| 96,617 | Northeast CT | (Same/Rural Planning Region) |
| 115,247 | Northwest Hills | (Same/Rural Planning Region) |
| 570,001 | South Central | (Same) |
| 286,711 | Southeastern CT | (Same) |
| 589,135 | Western CT | South Western CT MPO & Housatonic Valley MPO |

== Town ==
Unlike most other states outside of New England, where incorporated cities and towns are usually separated by unincorporated territory under the jurisdiction of a county, incorporated cities and towns encompass all of the territory within the state of Connecticut with no portion of the state being unincorporated. The 169 towns of Connecticut are the principal units of local government in the state and have full municipal powers including:

- Corporate powers
- Eminent domain
- Ability to levy taxes
- Public services (low cost housing, waste disposal, fire, police, ambulance, street lighting)
- Public works (highways, sewers, cemeteries, parking lots, etc.)
- Regulatory powers (building codes, traffic, animals, crime, public health)
- Environmental protection
- Economic development

Towns are officially creatures of the state, and their powers are set forth by statute and the state constitution. In practice, as is the case in most of New England, their authority has been very broadly construed, and there is a long-standing tradition of local autonomy.

Towns traditionally had the town meeting form of government, which is still used by some of the 169 towns. Under Connecticut's Home Rule Act, any town is permitted to adopt its own local charter and choose its own structure of government. The three basic structures of municipal government used in the state, with variations from place to place, are the selectman–town meeting, mayor–council, and manager–council.

Nineteen towns are also incorporated as cities; one town (Naugatuck) is also incorporated as a borough.

A town may consolidate with a city or borough that is coextensive with it. The 20 consolidated borough-towns and city-towns are classified by the Census Bureau as both minor civil divisions and incorporated places, while the other 149 towns are classified only as minor civil divisions. Some of the larger, urban towns are also classified in their entirety as census-designated places.

== City ==
All cities in Connecticut are dependent municipalities, meaning they are located within and subordinate to a town. However, except for one, all currently existing cities in Connecticut are consolidated with their parent town. Towns in Connecticut are allowed to adopt a city form of government without the need to re-incorporate as a city. Connecticut state law also makes no distinction between a consolidated town-city and a regular town.

There are currently twenty incorporated cities in Connecticut. Nineteen of these cities are coextensive with their towns, with the city and town governments also consolidated. One incorporated city (Groton) has jurisdiction over only part of its town. All cities are treated by the Census Bureau as incorporated places regardless of the settlement pattern.

== Borough ==
In addition to cities, Connecticut also has a type of dependent municipality known as a borough. Boroughs are usually the populated center of a town that decided to incorporate in order to have more responsive local government. When a borough is formed, it is still part of and dependent on its town. There are currently nine incorporated boroughs in Connecticut. One borough is coextensive and consolidated with its town. The other eight boroughs have jurisdiction over only a part of their town. All boroughs are treated by the Census Bureau as incorporated places. Since 1989, the Census Bureau has also listed Groton Long Point as a borough even though it has not been incorporated as a borough but is only a multi-purpose special services district within the town of Groton.

== Village, neighborhood, section of town ==
Connecticut also has a fair number of non-incorporated communities that are known locally as villages (usually in more rural areas), neighborhoods or "sections of" a city or town. "Villages" in this local Connecticut sense have no separate legal/corporate existence from the town they are in, although a taxing district or volunteer fire department sharing the name of the village may exist for specific services. With some exceptions, people who reside within a village often identify with the town rather than the village. Some villages and named sections of towns and cities were formerly incorporated as boroughs. Some villages are associated with historic districts which can serve to preserve some part of their more historically well preserved areas.

Some village and section names are also used as post office names or as the basis for naming census-designated places (CDPs), although the postal delivery area or CDP associated with the name often is considerably larger than the associated village or section. Some examples of villages, neighborhoods, and sections that have given their names to post offices or CDPs are Falls Village, Mystic, Niantic, Quaker Hill, South Kent, Stafford Springs, and Whitneyville.

== Special purpose agencies ==
=== Special tax and service districts ===
Unlike a dependent city or borough, special tax districts are not general purpose governments, but instead provide additional services to a portion of a town that are not necessarily available to residents outside the district. Examples of services provided include police and fire protection, maintenance of roads or public recreation facilities, or to provide various utilities. A special tax district has the right under Connecticut law to levy taxes on real estate and personal property within its borders. This tax is in addition to any taxes owed to parent town. It is formed when residents of the proposed district petition to create the district and successfully vote at public meeting or referendum to create the district; it cannot be unilaterally dissolved by the parent town. A special service district may also provide the same types of services, but is instead created by ordinance from the parent town. It is provided with revenue either from the municipality's general budget, or by a tax imposed by the host municipality on property within the district. In several Connecticut towns, special tax districts are the legal successor to boroughs or cities that consolidated with the parent town.

=== Quasi-public state agencies ===
Connecticut has numerous specially chartered quasi-public state agencies that operate outside of the executive branch of the state government. These organization provide either statewide or regional services. They are created to provide flexibility of administration, avoiding many of the regulations that public agencies are subject to. Such agencies are organized under CGS § 1-120(1). Examples include the Capital Region Development Authority, which provides loans and grants to support private development in and around Hartford, CT or the Connecticut Lottery Corporation, which oversees lottery gaming in the state.

List of Connecticut quasi-public agencies:

- Access Health CT
- Capital Region Development Authority
- Connecticut Airport Authority
- Connecticut Green Bank
- Connecticut Health and Educational Facilities Authority
- Connecticut Higher Education Supplemental Loan Authority
- Connecticut Housing Finance Authority
- Connecticut Innovations, Inc.
- Connecticut Lottery Corporation
- Connecticut Paid Family and Medical Leave Insurance Authority
- Connecticut Port Authority
- Connecticut Retirement Security Authority
- Connecticut Student Loan Foundation
- Materials Innovation and Recycling Authority
- State Education Resource Center
