= PeoplesBank =

Bank in Massachusetts, US

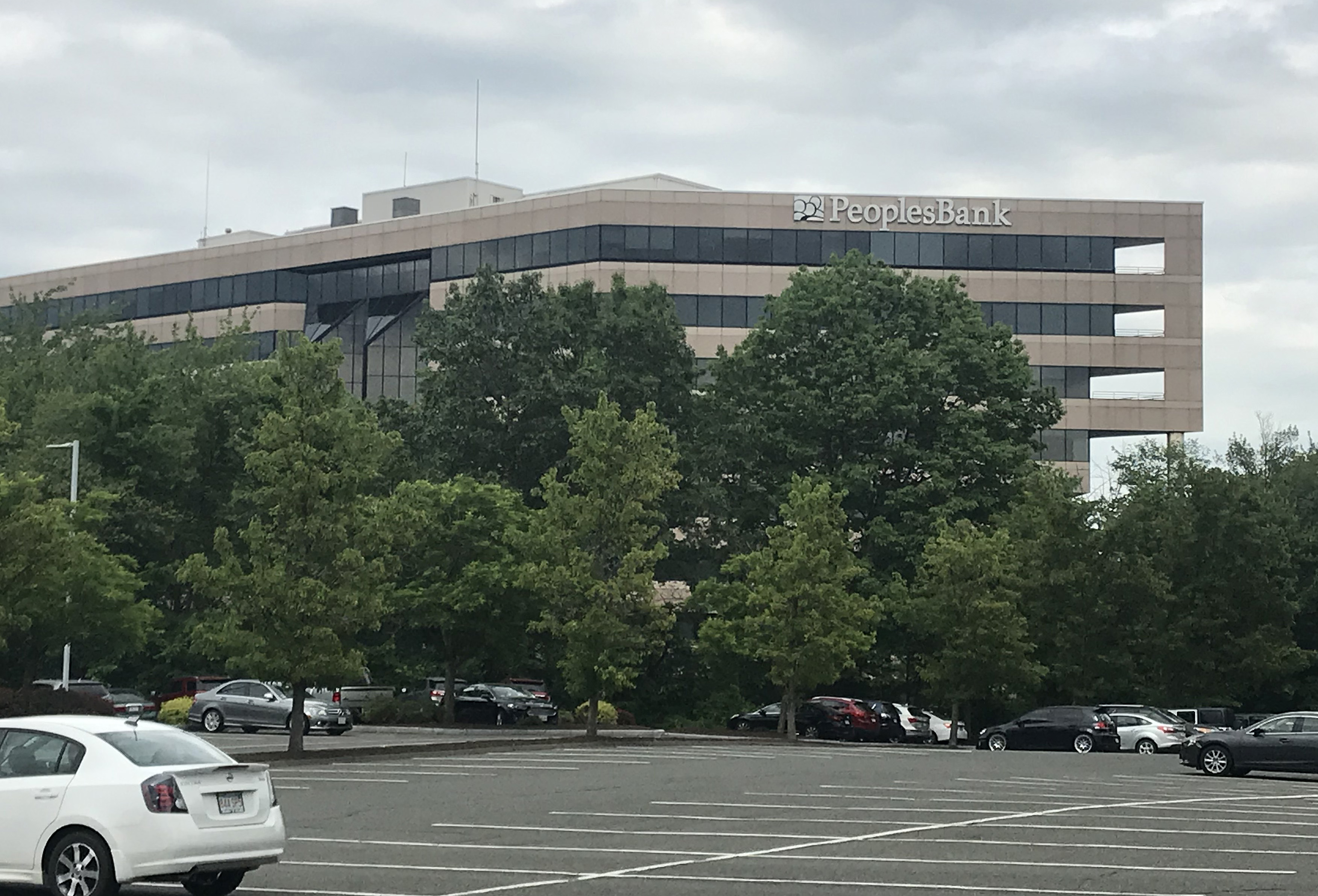
- PeoplesBank corporate offices in Holyoke, Massachusetts
- Company type: Mutual Holding Company
- Industry: Financial services
- Founded: 1885 as Peoples Savings Bank; 2003 as PeoplesBank
- Headquarters: Holyoke, Massachusetts
- Number of locations: 21 branch offices
- Area served: Western Massachusetts
- Key people: Thomas W. Senecal, President and CEO
- Total assets: ▲US$3,580 million (2021)
- Number of employees: 299
- Website: www.bankatpeoples.com

PeoplesBank is the largest community bank in Western Massachusetts, providing banking and other financial services. As of 2020 it had $3.3 billion in assets.

== History ==
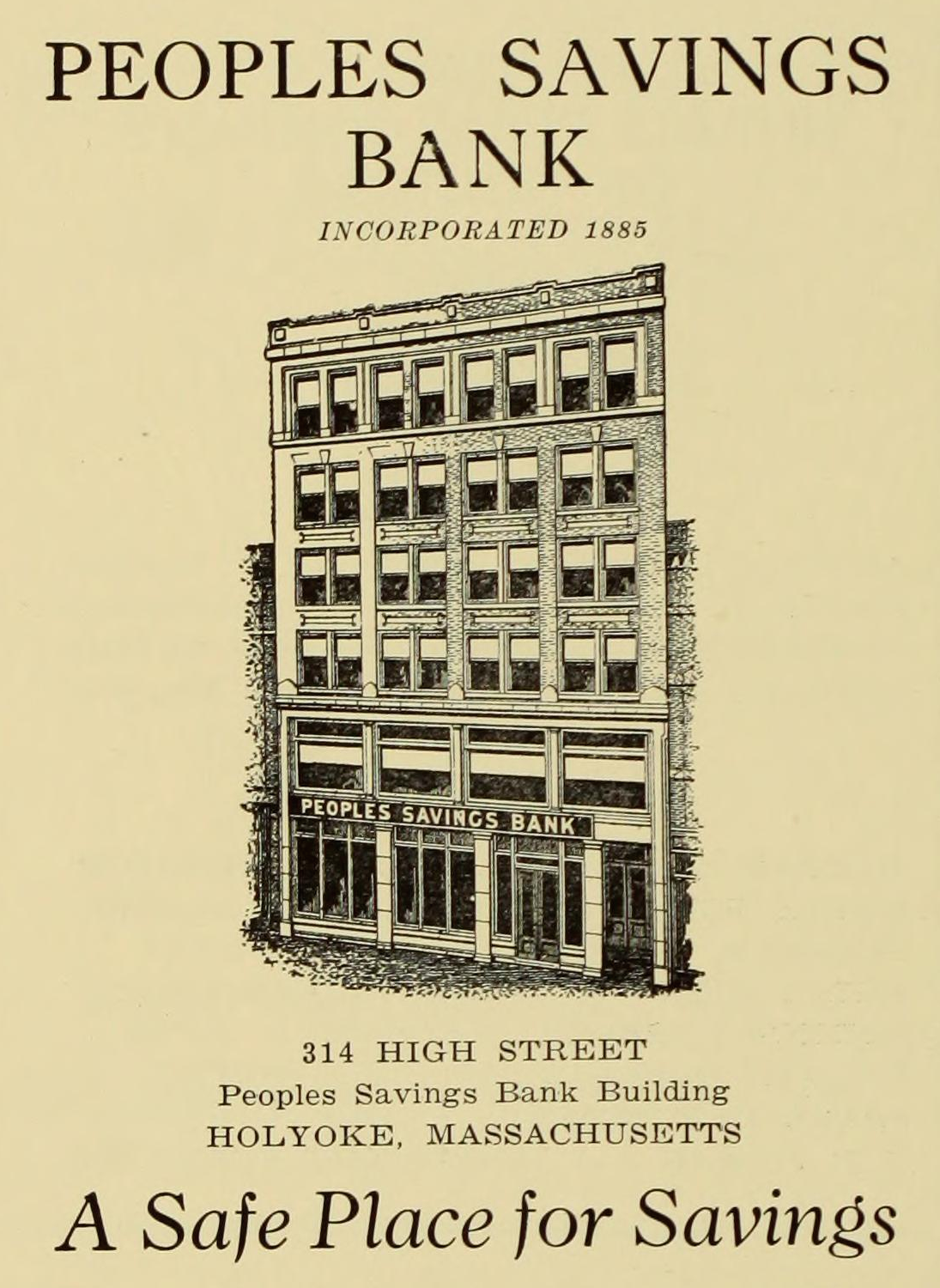
Early 20th century ad for Peoples Savings Bank

PeoplesBank is a branch bank incorporated on March 19, 1885 as Peoples Savings Bank. Its first president was William Skinner of William Skinner and Sons Silk, who would serve as the bank's president from its founding until 1901, a year before his passing. A number of prominent figures in Holyoke's founding would work for the bank, including architect George P. B. Alderman, who sat on its board, and Judge John Hildreth, as a clerk, whose Oakdale estate, the Yankee Pedlar, was reopened as a branch of the bank in 2019. It was first headquartered in Downtown Holyoke, Massachusetts with an additional office in Springfield, Massachusetts. In 1974, the bank would expand its headquarters with a large Brutalist commercial block at the corners of High and Suffolk Streets as part of a city revitalization campaign, where it maintains a branch today.

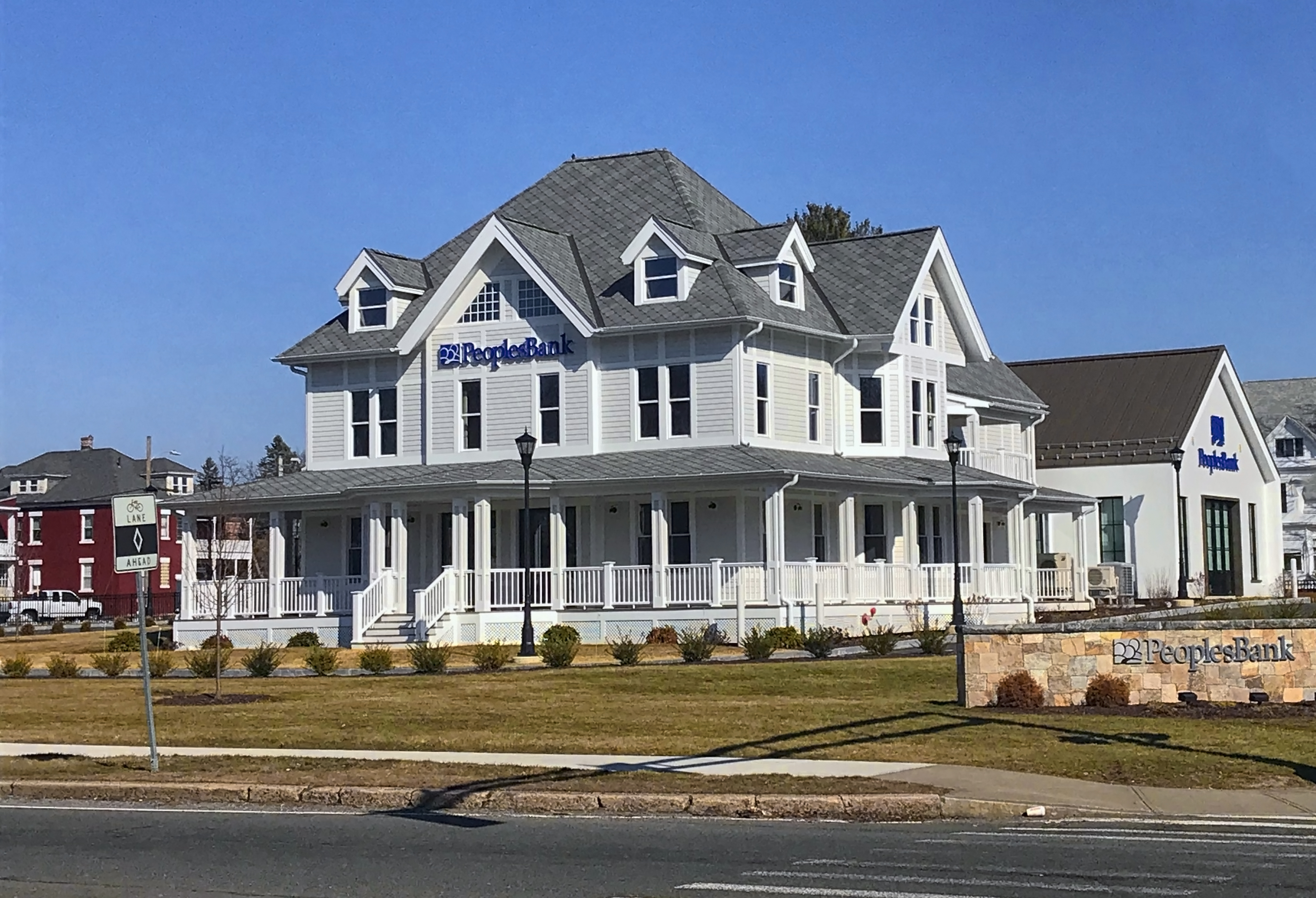
The former Yankee Pedlar Inn in Holyoke, renovated as a branch in 2019.

By October 2003, it formally changed its name to PeoplesBank, and operates as a subsidiary of PeoplesBancorp, MHC (Holyoke, MA), out of headquarters by the Holyoke Mall at 330 Whitney Avenue, formerly the offices of Community Savings Bank.

== Sponsorship ==
The City of Hartford and Capital Region Development Authority, entered a naming-rights agreement in 2025, to rename the XL Center after the bank to PeoplesBank Arena.
