= Mumford Cove =

Coordinates: 41.323°N 72.014°W

Mumford Cove is a private association in Southeastern Connecticut located adjacent to Groton Long Point, bordered by Noank Connecticut Haley's Farm nature preserve, Palmer's Cove, and Fisher's Island Sound. It is a part of the town of Groton, Connecticut. The neighborhood was first developed in the late 1960s, and former Connecticut Governor John Dempsey briefly lived there.

Mumford Cove experienced ecological crises in the 1970s, when raw sewage was routinely pumped into the waters of the cove and salt marshes of the area. Since this practice was halted, the EPA has studied and assessed the health and safety of the waters off of Mumford Cove, which have now nearly returned to their natural levels.
