= Groton Long Point =

- Borough
- Borough of Groton Long Point
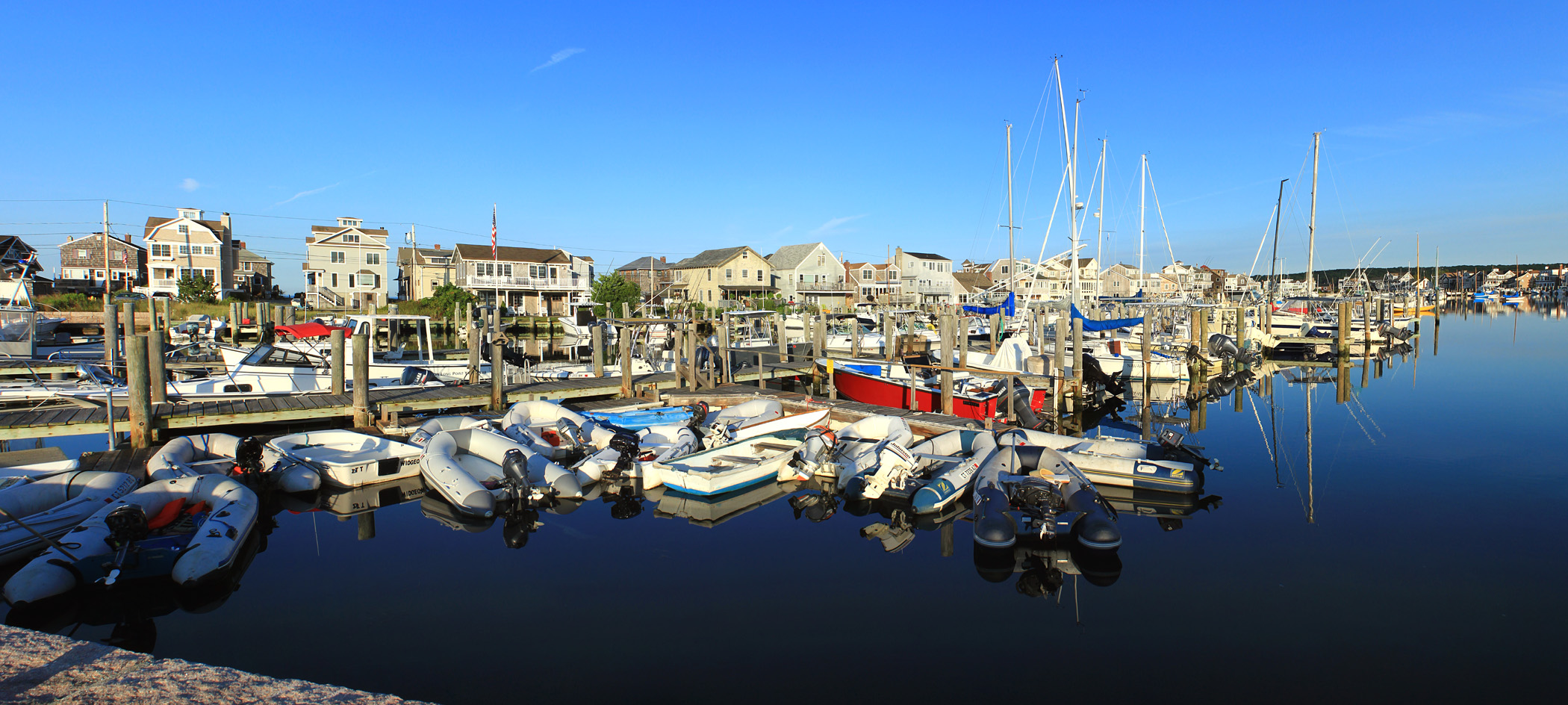
- Groton Long Point Yacht Club, Outer Lagoon

- Location in New London County, Connecticut
- Coordinates: 41°18′52″N 72°00′28″W
- Country: United States
- U.S. state: Connecticut
- County: New London
- Region: Southeastern CT
- Town: Groton

Area
  - Total: 0.39 sq mi (1.0 km^{2})
  - Land: 0.39 sq mi (1.0 km^{2})
  - Water: 0.039 sq mi (0.10 km^{2})
- Elevation: 6.6 ft (2 m)

Population (2010)
  - Total: 518
  - Density: 1,300/sq mi (520/km^{2})
- Time zone: UTC−5 (Eastern (EST))
  - Summer (DST): UTC−4 (EDT)
- ZIP code: 06340
- Area code: 860
- FIPS code: 09-34460
- GNIS feature ID: 207535
- Website: glpct.org

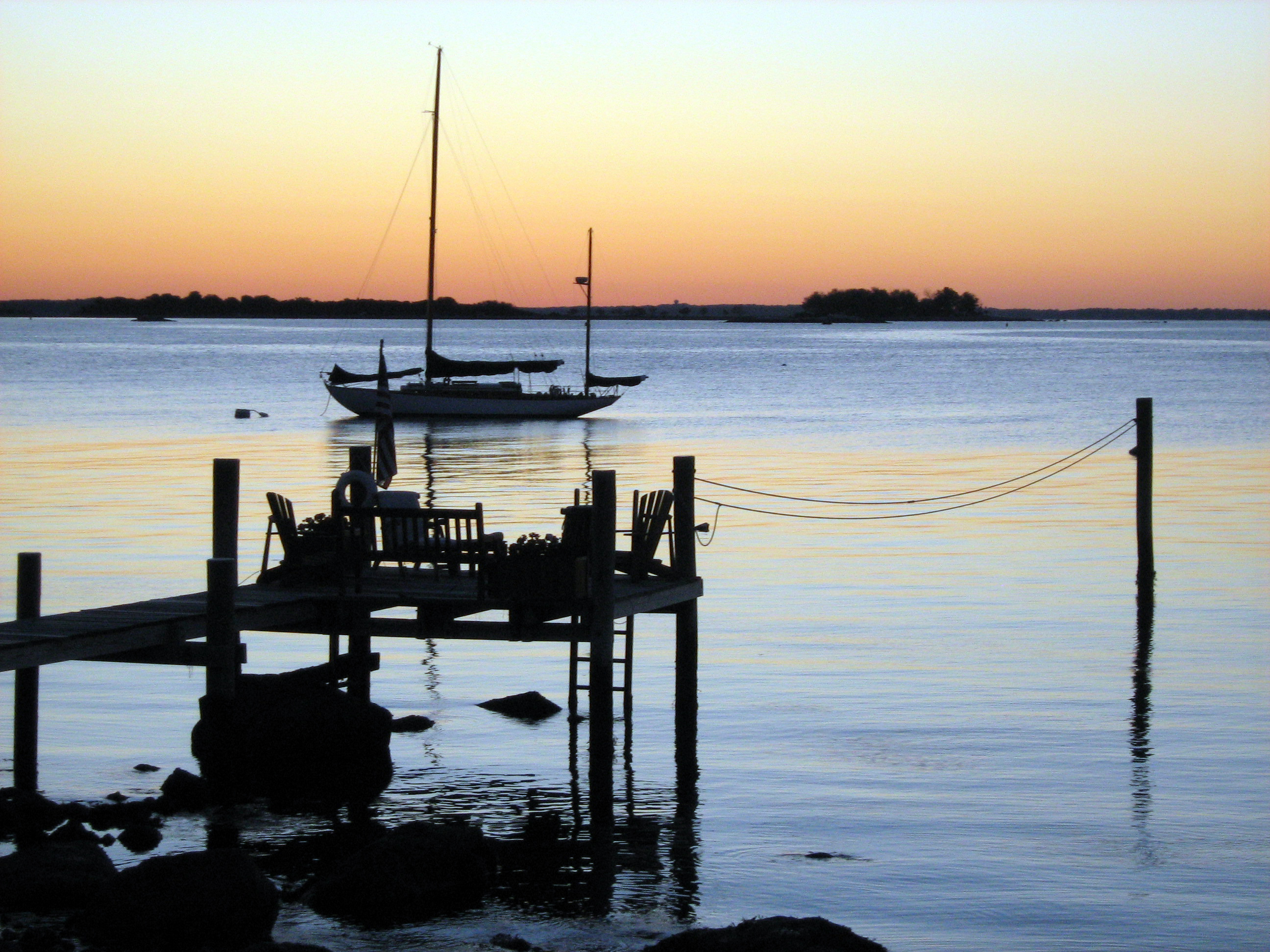
Sunrise from East Shore Ave

Groton Long Point (GLP) is located within the town of Groton, on Fishers Island Sound, in New London County, Connecticut, United States. The year-round population was 518 at the 2010 census.

The area is administered by the Groton Long Point Association (GLPA), a public association that was established by Special Act of the Connecticut Legislature in 1921. The act is the charter of the GLPA and enables the Association to tax and issue bonds to provide services independent of the town of Groton; typically, such municipal corporations provided services that the larger township could not or would not provide. Pursuant to the act, the GLPA has the same governmental powers as a borough. Today, such a special taxing district can be formed by Connecticut residents on their own without special acts of the Legislature. The area is treated by the U.S. Census Bureau as a borough, although it is not formally incorporated as such.

== Summer Beach area ==
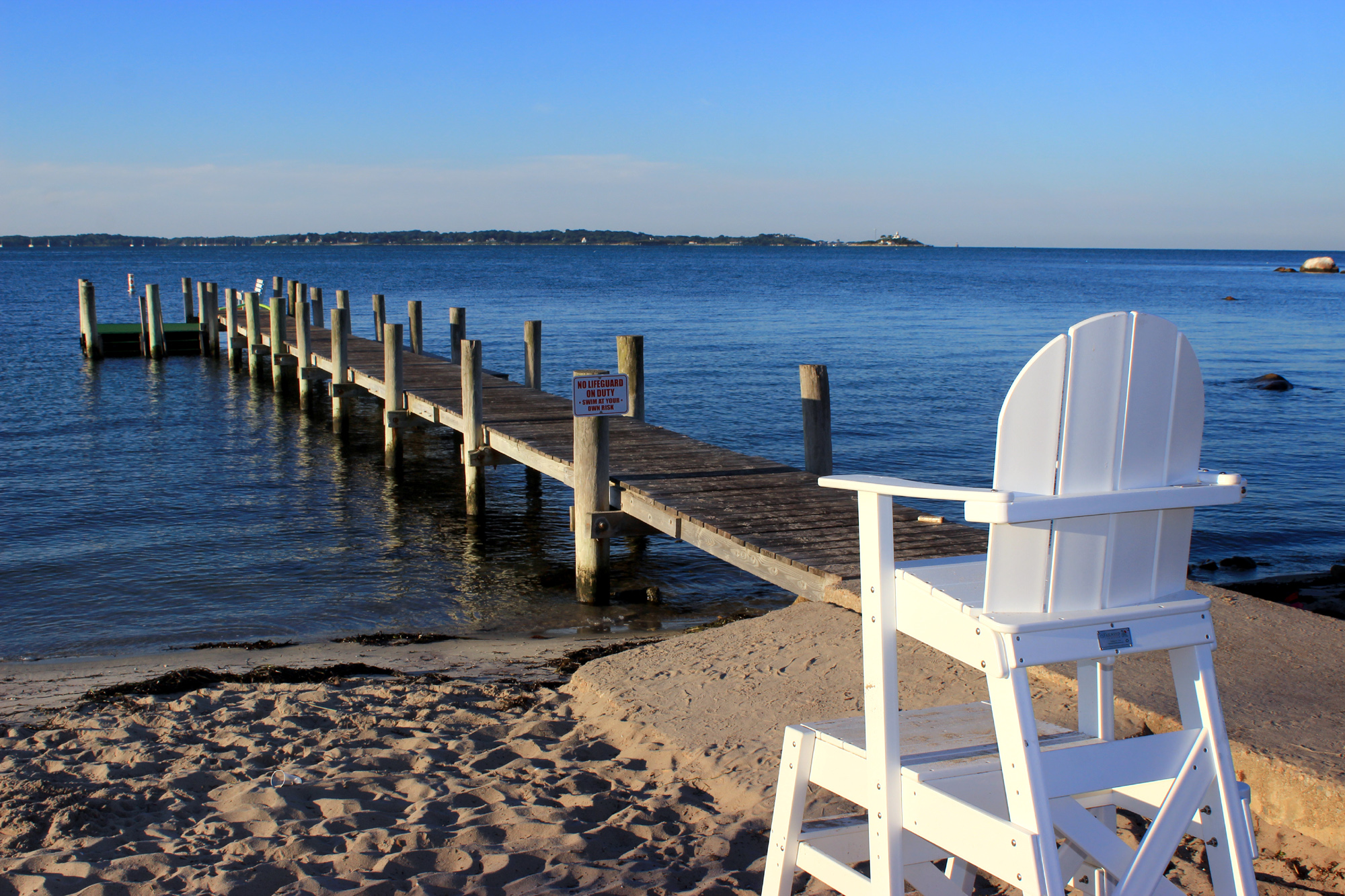
South Beach Dock, GLP

Groton Long Point sees the local population dramatically increase in the summer season. From late May through late September, nearly every property is occupied by its owners or by summer tenants; the number of people also increases on summer weekends compared to summer weekdays. The Groton Long Point Yacht Club is a cross between a traditional yacht club and a summer camp, as it runs many classes for children. These include swimming, sailing, sports, and tennis lessons. The Yacht Club also organizes evening events such as dances, movies, and scavenger hunts for children; events are also organized for adults and families, including concerts at nearby Esker Point, dances, and fireworks.

== The off season ==
Being a summer community, Groton Long Point experiences something of an exodus in early October, as many of the summer families and the renters exit, leaving only a small number of full-time residents from November through April. Children remaining attend Groton public schools, including nearby Fitch Senior High School.

== Groton Long Point Police Department and Volunteer Fire Department ==
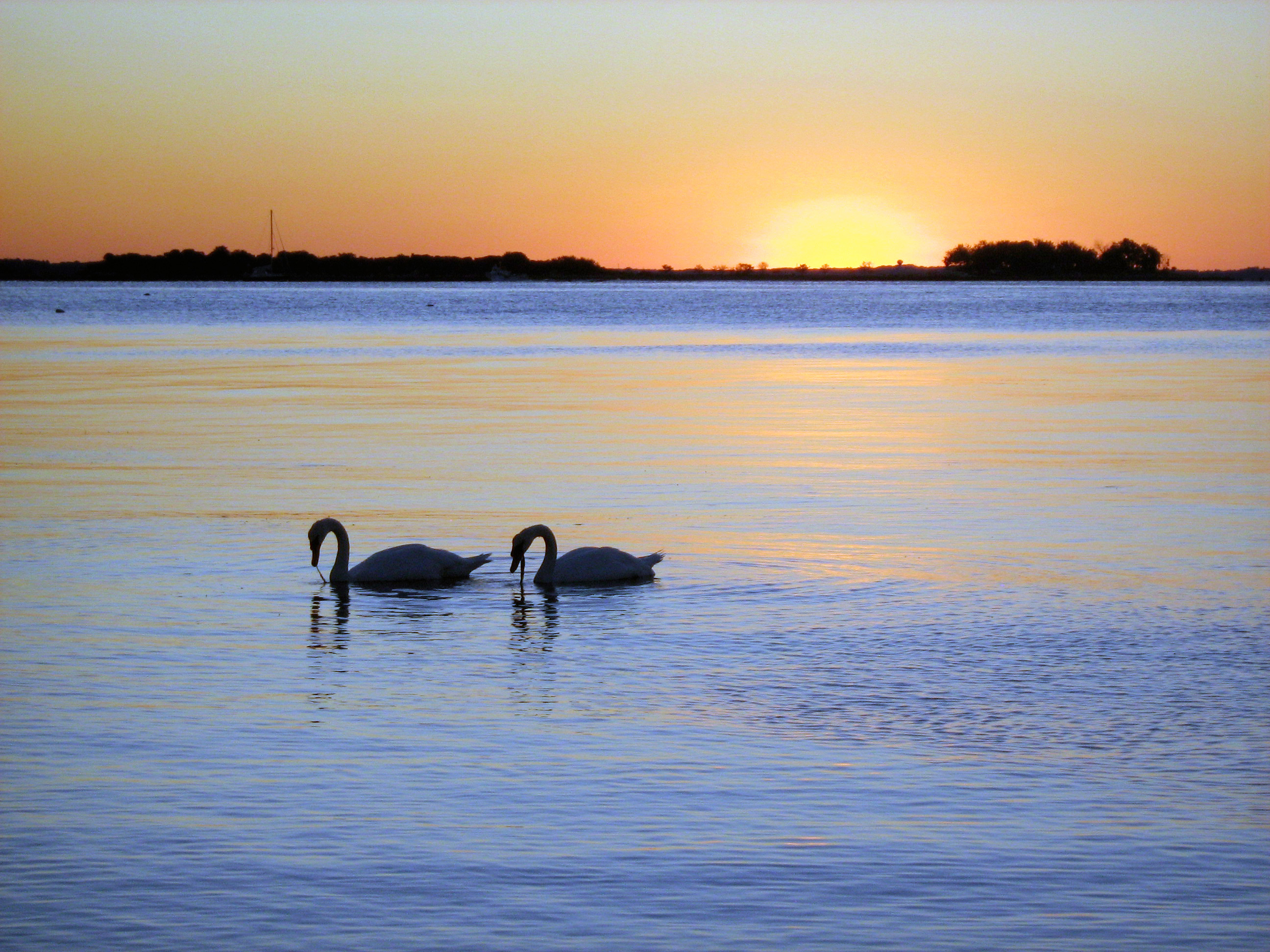
Swans GLP

The Point is protected year-round by the Groton Long Point Police Department, with a chief and officers certified by the State of Connecticut Police Officer Standards and Training Council. Groton Long Point also has a Volunteer Fire Department, established in 1951. The mission of the Fire Department is "the preservation of lives and property, the extinguishment of fires, the provision of emergency medical services and social assembly". The Fire Department hosts the 4th of July parade each year.

== Geography ==
According to the United States Census Bureau, the borough has a total area of 0.4 square miles (1.0 km^{2}), of which 0.4 square miles (1.0 km^{2}) is land and 0.04 square miles (0.10 km^{2}) (4.44%) is water and is adjacent to Mumford Cove.

== Demographics ==
Historical population
Census	Pop.	Note	%±
2000	667		—
2010	518		−22.3%
2020	530		2.3%
Population 2000 - 2008

As of the census of 2000, there were 667 people, 306 households, and 205 families residing in Groton Long Point. The population density was 1,529.6 people per square mile (590.6 people/km^{2}). There were 589 housing units at an average density of 1,350.8 units per square mile (521.5 units/km^{2}). The racial makeup was 95.65% White, 0.15% African American, 0.45% Native American, 0.90% Asian, 0.45% from other races, and 2.40% from two or more races. Hispanic or Latino of any race were 3.45% of the population.

There were 306 households, out of which 20.6% had children under the age of 18 living with them, 58.2% were married couples living together, 6.2% had a female householder with no husband present, and 33.0% were non-families. 30.1% of all households were made up of individuals, and 10.1% had someone living alone who was 65 years of age or older. The average household size was 2.18 and the average family size was 2.70.

The population was spread out, with 18.9% under the age of 18, 3.3% from 18 to 24, 22.9% from 25 to 44, 33.3% from 45 to 64, and 21.6% who were 65 years of age or older. The median age was 48 years. For every 100 females, there were 95.6 males. For every 100 females age 18 and over, there were 93.9 males.

The median household income was $87,027, and the median income for a family was $101,217. Males had a median income of $62,426 versus $40,313 for females. The per capita income was $51,066. None of the families and 0.3% of the population were living below the poverty line, including no under eighteens and none of those over 64.

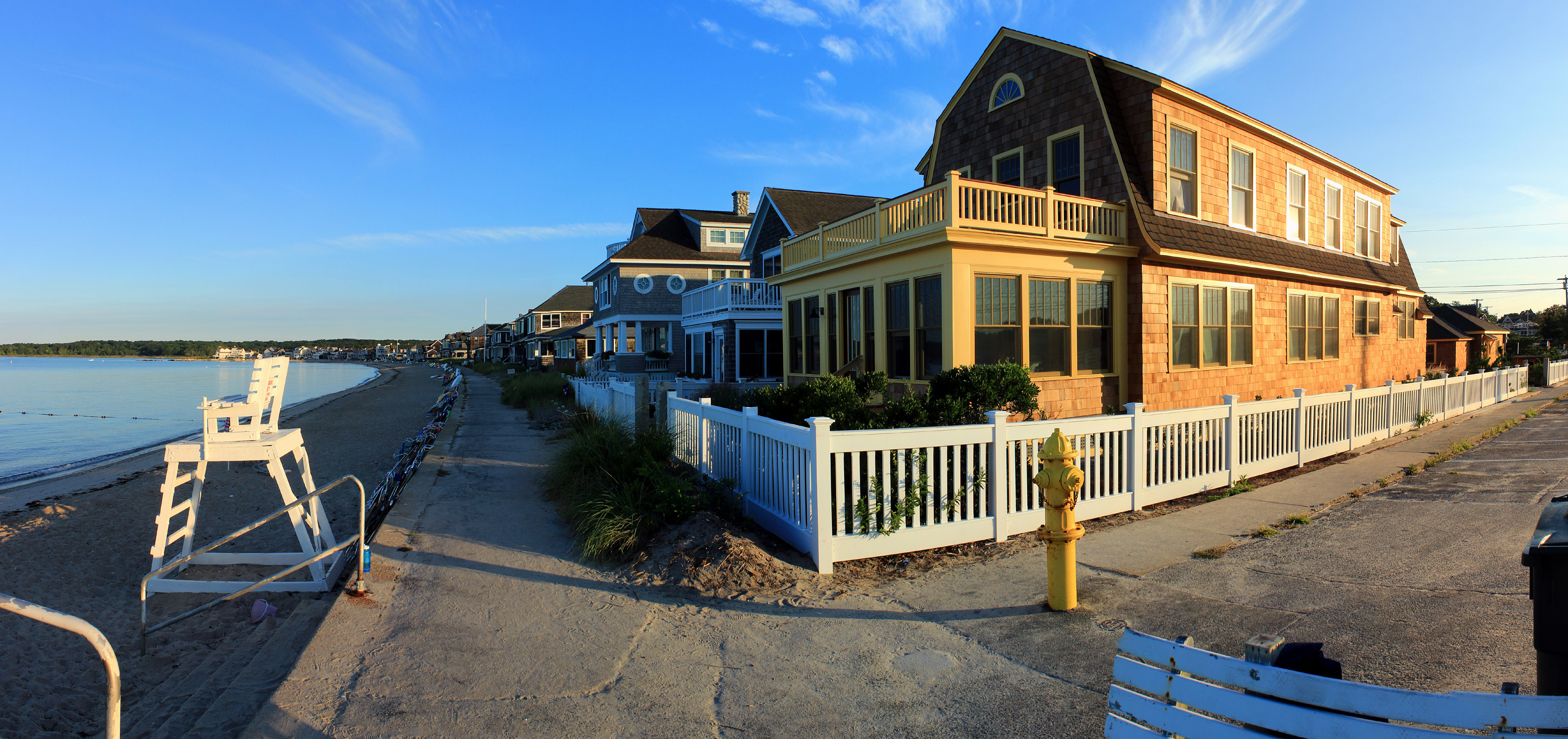
'Main Beach', Boardwalk at Groton Long Point

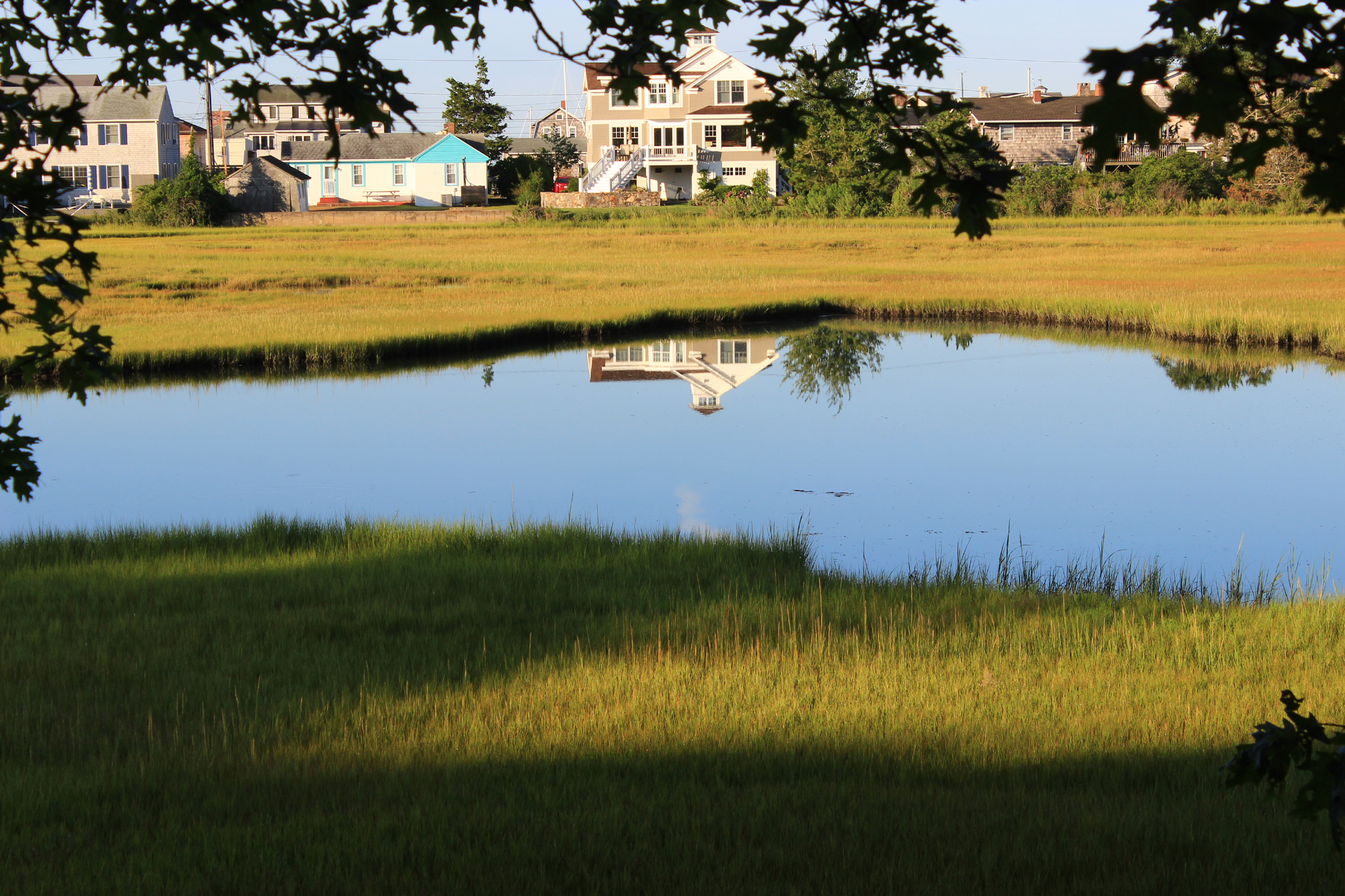
Wetlands, Groton Long Point

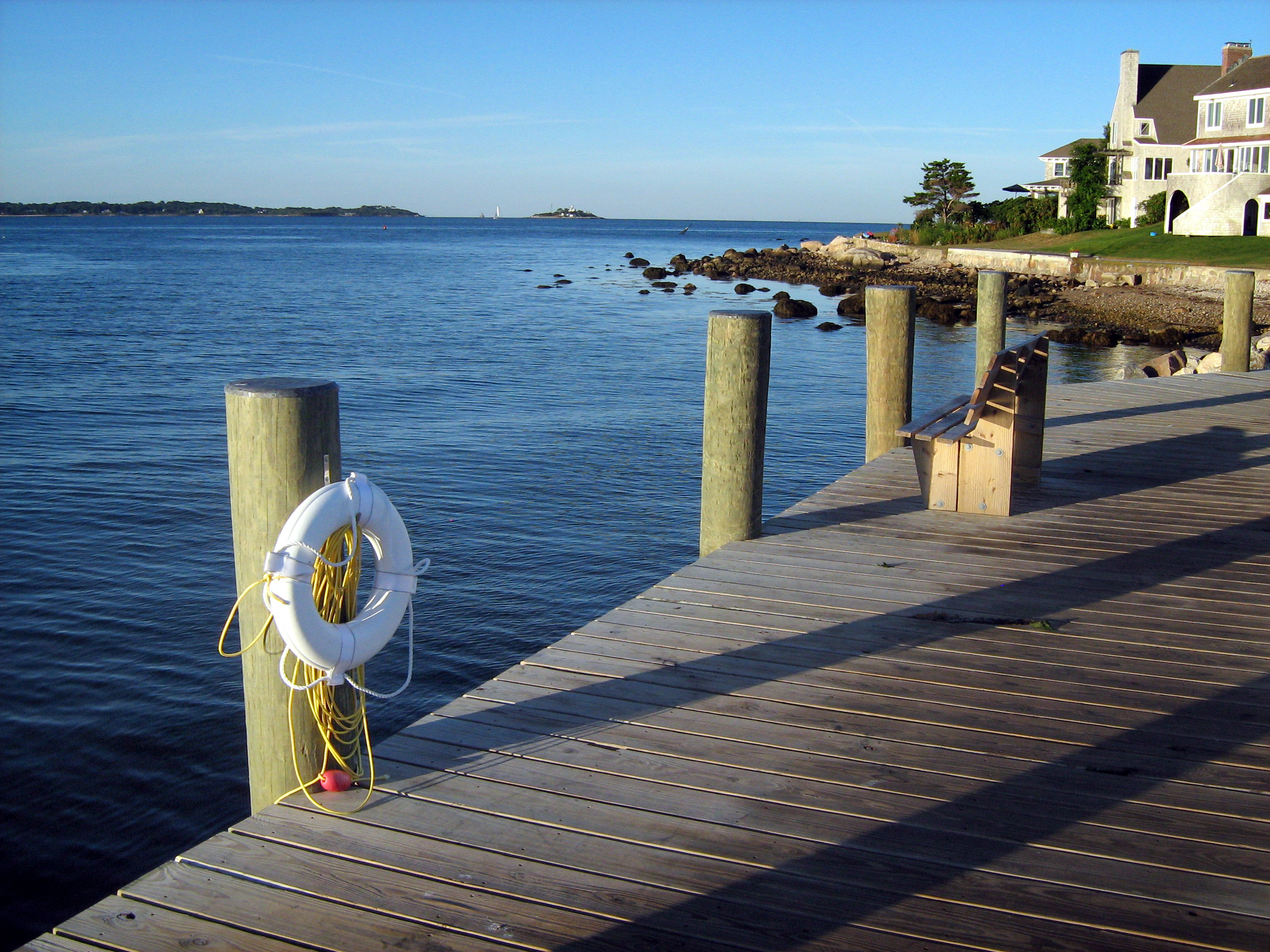
East Dock

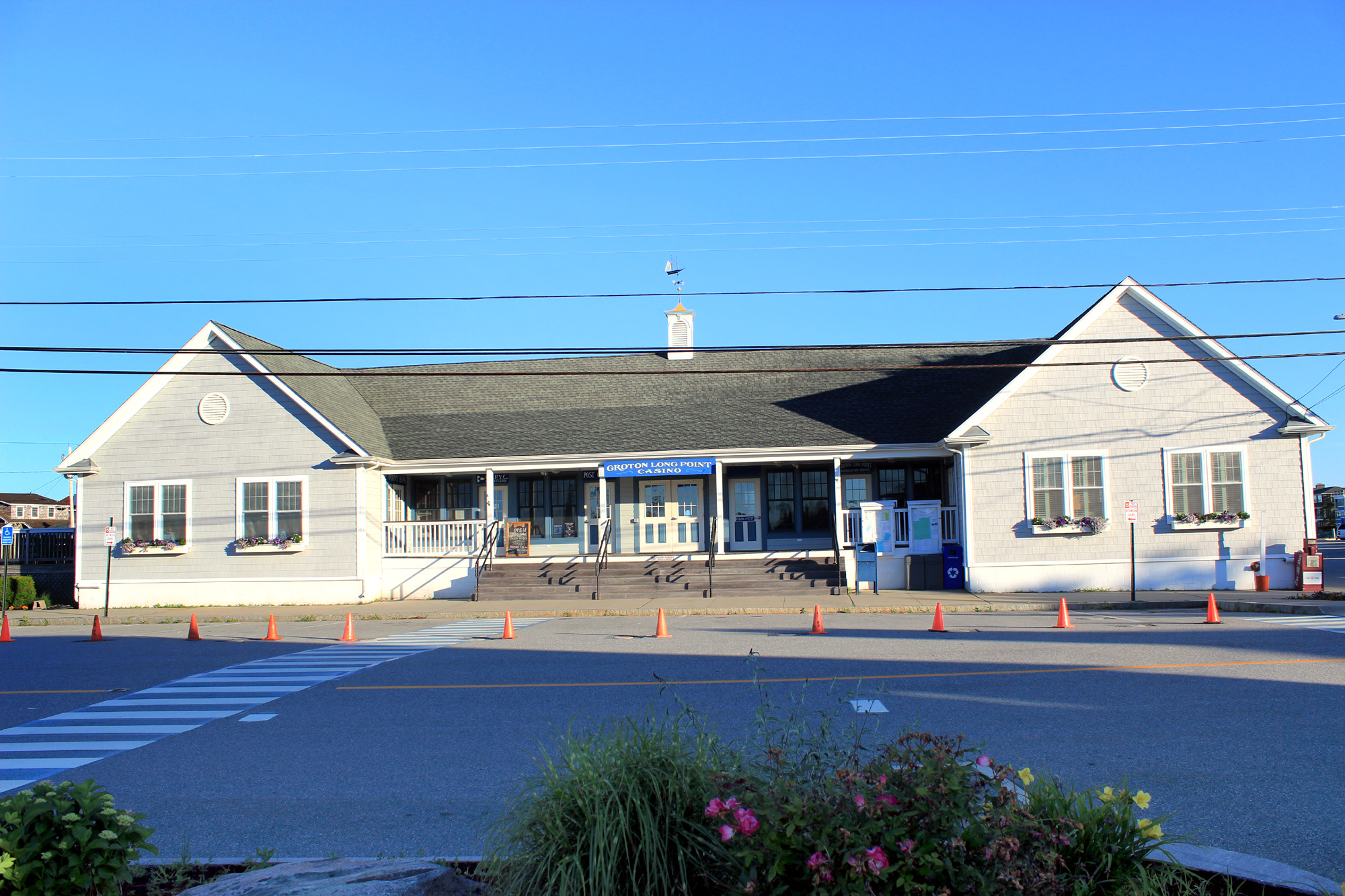
Groton Long Point Casino

== Education ==
The borough, along with the rest of Groton Town, is in the Groton School District.
