= Groton Long Point Yacht Club =

Coordinates: 41.3120°N 72.0102°W

- Burgee
- Short name: GLPYC
- Founded: 1934
- Location: Groton Long Point, Connecticut United States
- Website: www.glpyc.org

Groton Long Point Yacht Club (GLPYC) was charted in 1934 in the beach community of Groton Long Point, Connecticut and remains active today. Functioning during the summer as something akin to a summer camp, the Yacht Club currently runs classes in sailing (420's, Optis, and Seashells), swimming, tennis, and sports.
