= PeoplesBank Arena =

Arena and convention center in Hartford, Connecticut

- The PeoplesBank Arena logo

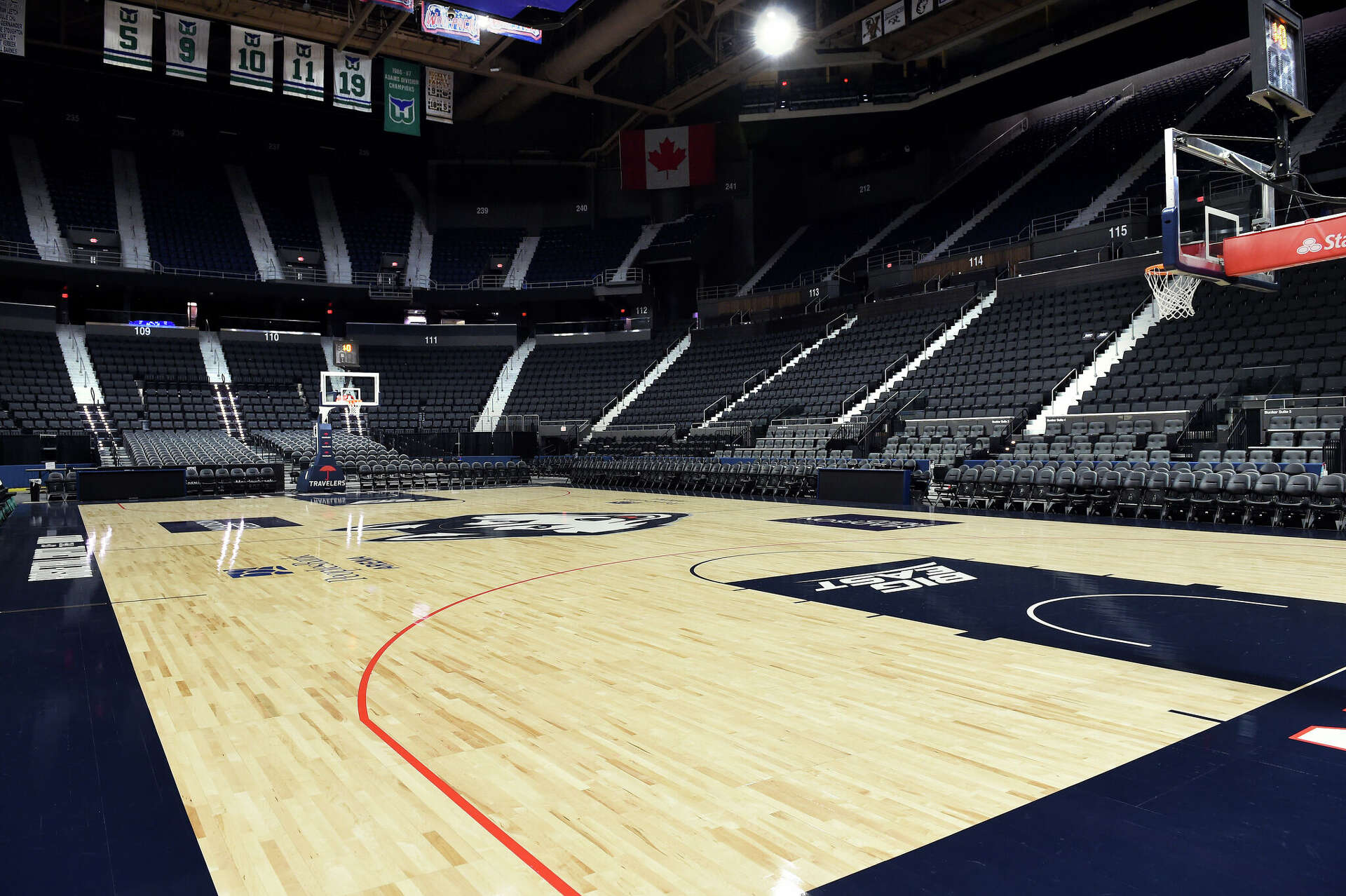
- The PeoplesBank Arena after 2025 renovation before a UConn Basketball game

- Location within Connecticut Location within the United States
- Interactive map of PeoplesBank Arena
- Former names: Hartford Civic Center (1975–2007); XL Center (2007–2025)
- Address: 1 Civic Center Plaza
- Location: Hartford, Connecticut, U.S.
- Coordinates: 41°46′06″N 72°40′37″W
- Owner: City of Hartford
- Operator: Oak View Group
- Capacity: Concerts: 20,500; Basketball: 15,495; Ice hockey: 14,750 (9,801 with curtain system)
- Surface: 200 ft × 85 ft (61 m × 26 m) (hockey)
- Public transit: Hartford; 38, 60, 62, 64, 66, 72, 74, 76, Dash

Construction
- Groundbreaking: April 2, 1971
- Opened: January 9, 1975
- Closed: 1978–1980 (roof collapse, renovations), Q2 2025 (renovations)
- Cost: originally $30 million ($179 million in 2025 dollars)
- Architects: Kling & Associates; Danos and Associates
- Project manager: Gilbane Building Company
- Structural engineers: Fraoli, Blum, and Yesselman, Engineers
- General contractor: William L. Crow Construction Company

Tenants
- Hartford Wolf Pack (Note: Known as the Connecticut Whale from 2010 to 2013.) (AHL) (1997–present); UConn Huskies (NCAA); Men's basketball (1975–present) (Note: Part-time.) (Note: Tenure interrupted in 1978 by roof collapse.); Women's basketball (1975–present); Men's ice hockey (2014–present); Boston Celtics (NBA) (1975–1995); Hartford Whalers (Note: Known as the New England Whalers of the WHA from 1972 to 1979.) (NHL) (1975–1997); Hartford Hellions (MISL) (1980–1981); Connecticut Coyotes (AFL) (1995–1996); Connecticut Pride (CBA) (1995–1998); New England Blizzard (ABL) (1996–1998); New England Sea Wolves (AFL) (1999–2000)

Website
- peoplesbankarena.com

The PeoplesBank Arena (originally known as the Hartford Civic Center and formerly as the XL Center) is a multi-purpose arena and convention center located in downtown Hartford, Connecticut. Owned by the City of Hartford, it is managed by the quasi-public Capital Region Development Authority (CRDA), under a lease with the city, and operated by OVG. The arena is ranked the 28th largest among college basketball arenas. It opened in 1975 as the Hartford Civic Center and was originally located adjacent to Civic Center Mall, which was demolished in 2004. It consists of two facilities: the Veterans Memorial Coliseum and the Exhibition Center. In December 2007, the center was renamed when the arena's naming rights were sold to XL Group insurance company in a six-year agreement. This agreement was extended and lasted until 2025 when the arena was renamed as part of an agreement with PeoplesBank.

On March 21, 2007, the CRDA selected the Northland/Anschutz Entertainment Group proposal to operate the arena complex; Northland also developed the Hartford 21 residential tower on the adjacent Civic Center Mall site. The agreement also stated that Northland would assume total responsibility for the building bearing the cost of any and all losses, and would retain any profits. In 2012, the CRDA put the contract out to bid with hopes of combining the operations with Rentschler Field. In February 2013, Global Spectrum of Philadelphia was chosen to take over both the XL Center and Rentschler Field with Ovations Food Services taking over all food and beverage operations.

== Overview ==
The PeoplesBank Arena is the full-time home of the Hartford Wolf Pack AHL hockey team and part-time home of the University of Connecticut (UConn) men's and women's basketball teams and the UConn Huskies men's ice hockey team. The UConn men's basketball team has played at PeoplesBank Arena since 1976. UConn continued playing the majority of home games at PeoplesBank Arena until the opening of their on campus home, Gampel Pavilion, after which games were split between the two arenas. The UConn men's hockey team also continues to play a package of games at PeoplesBank Arena after opening Toscano Family Ice Forum on campus.

It was the home of the New England/Hartford Whalers of the WHA and NHL from 1975 to 1978 and 1980 to 1997, and the Hartford Hellions of the MISL from 1980 to 1981, and the New England Blizzard of the ABL from 1996 to 1998, and was the home of the Connecticut Coyotes and later the New England Sea Wolves of the Arena Football League.

The venue hosted occasional Boston Celtics home games from 1975 to 1995. One of the most famous shots Larry Bird ever made, although it did not count, took place at the Hartford Civic Center: the shot from behind the backboard.

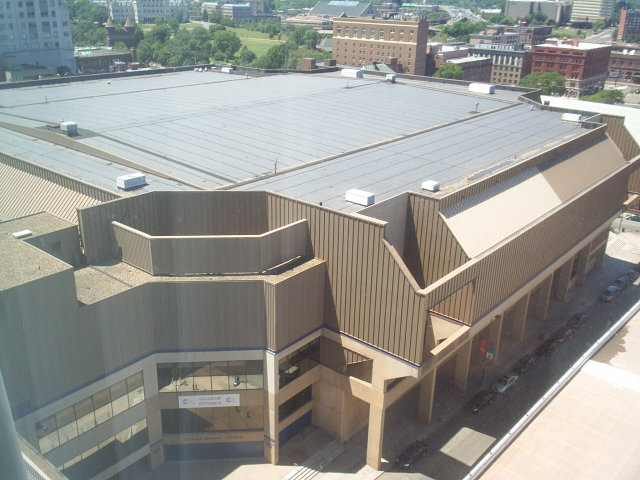
View of arena's northern exterior

The arena seats 15,635 for ice hockey and 16,294 for basketball, 16,606 for center-stage concerts, 16,282 for end-stage concerts, and 8,239 for 3/4-end stage concerts, and contains 46 luxury suites and a 310-seat Coliseum Club, plus 25,000 square feet (2,300 m^{2}) of arena floor space, enabling it to be used for trade shows and conventions in addition to concerts, circuses, ice shows, sporting events and other events. The graduation ceremonies of Central Connecticut State University and other local colleges are also held annually at the PeoplesBank Arena.

=== Early history and roof collapse ===
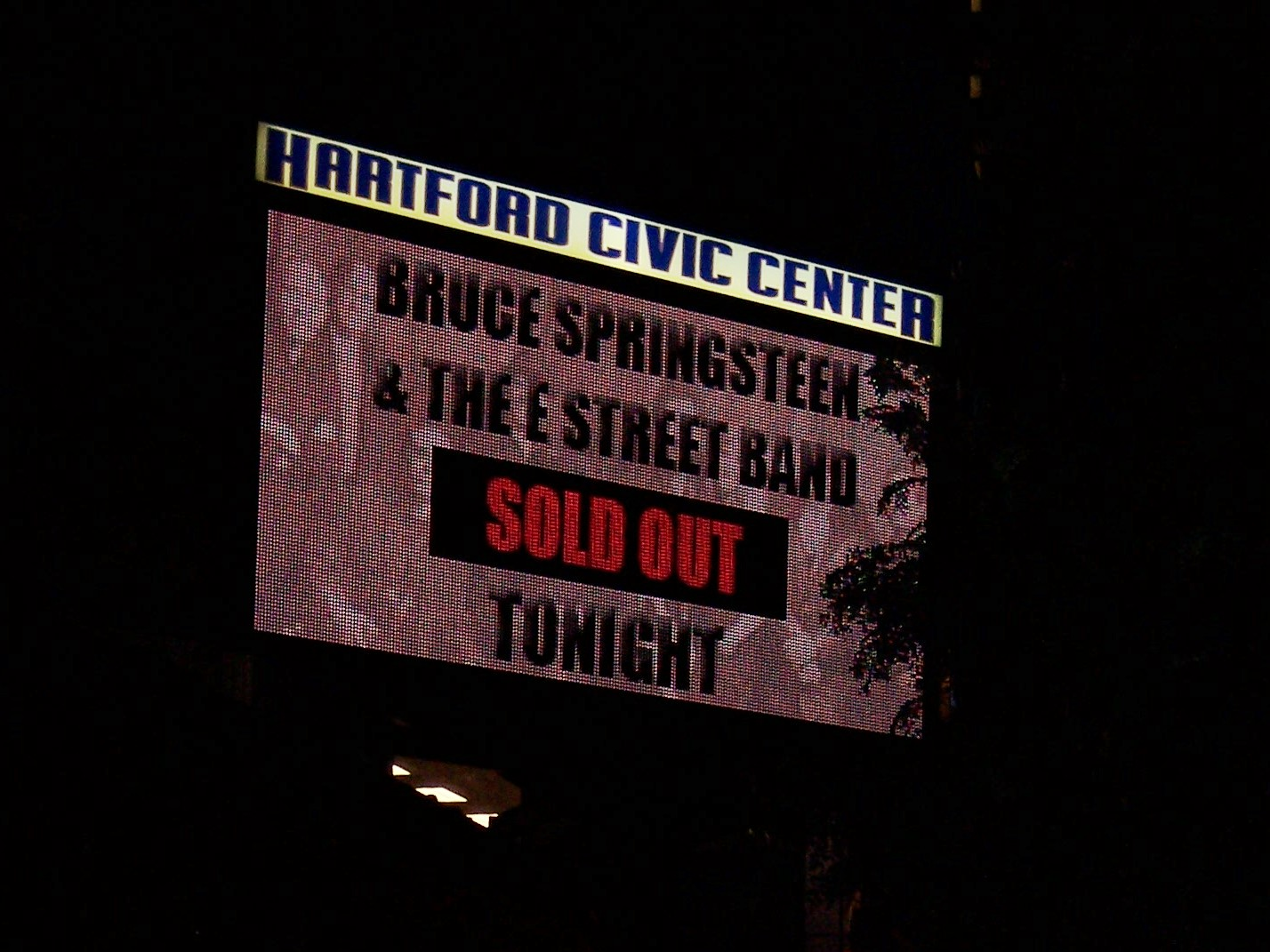
The arena remains a site for popular concerts. October 2007.

As originally built in 1975, it seated 10,507 for hockey, and served as the home of the then–New England Whalers for three years. In the early morning of January 18, 1978, the Civic Center's roof collapsed. Engineering analyses during litigation following the collapse indicated that compression members were overloaded through undersizing and underestimation of the probable loadings, and that lateral bracing of individual members was insufficient. "The roof did not fail due to the heavy snow that fell on that January night. According to the official City investigation, the roof began progressive failure as soon as it had been installed. Contributing factors included design errors, an underestimation of the weight of the roof, and differences between the design and the actual built structure."

Investigations attributed the design issues to the unprecedented use of and trust in computer analysis. An absence of peer review for the novel structure and design process, and fragmentation of oversight responsibility during construction were also cited as contributing factors. Evidence showed that the roof had started to fail during construction, with bowed compression members. These distortions, and an unpredicted degree of deflection in the structure, were not investigated before the collapse. There were no injuries due to the collapse. The building was extensively renovated and re-opened on January 17, 1980.

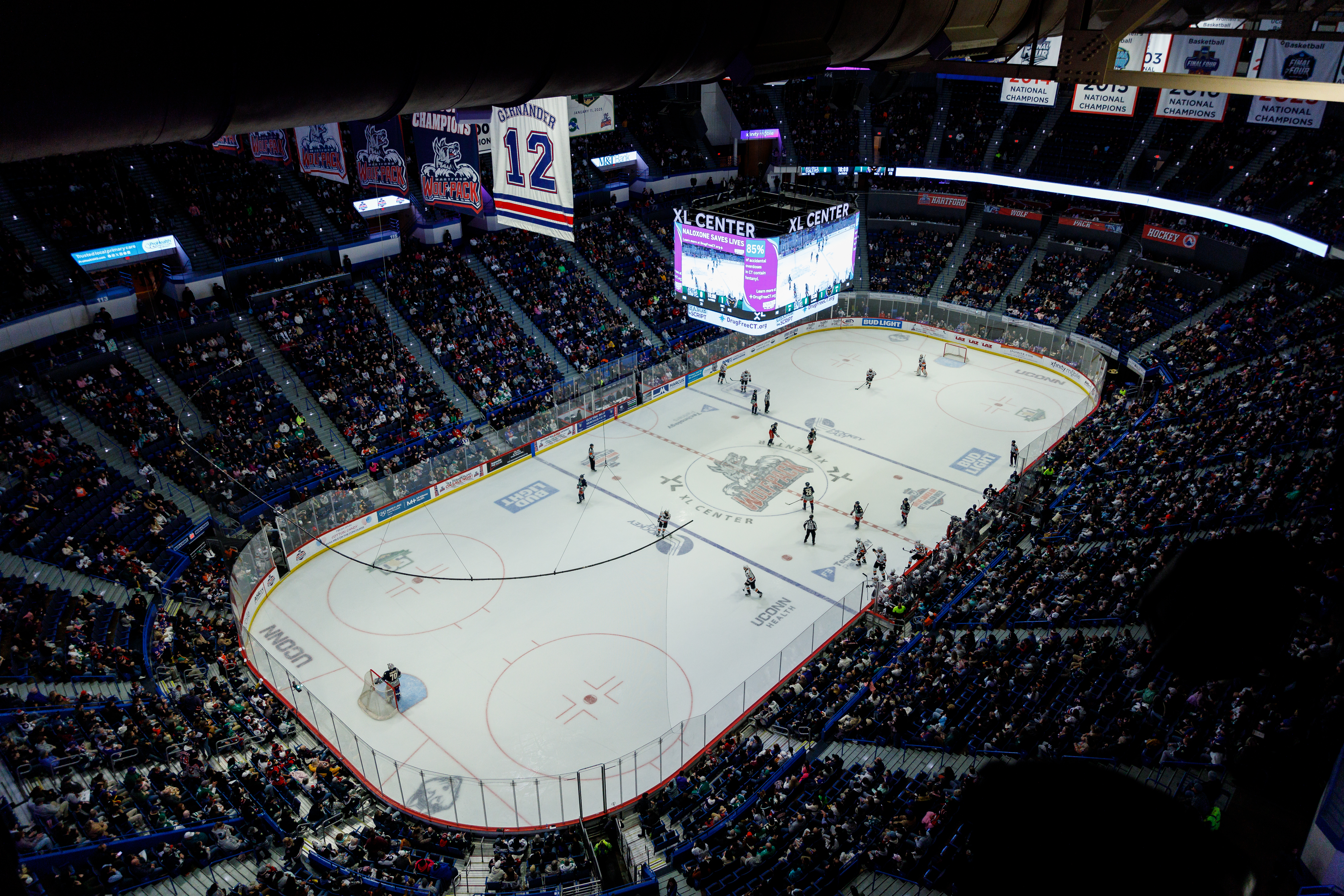
PeoplesBank Arena with a crowd for Wolf Pack Hockey (AHL) (Before 2025 Renovation)

The Civic Center hosted the Hartford Whalers from 1975 to 1997, when the team relocated to Raleigh to become the Carolina Hurricanes. In 1994, new owner Peter Karmanos pledged to keep the Whalers in Connecticut until 1998, unless they could not sell over 11,000 season tickets. After failed negotiations to build a new downtown arena for the Whalers with then-governor John G. Rowland, on March 25, 1997, Karmanos announced that the team would leave. The New York Rangers franchise, looking to capitalize on Hartford as a potential market, placed its farm team there to become the Hartford Wolf Pack, starting in 1997. After a short stint as the Connecticut Whale from 2010 to 2012, they reverted to the Wolf Pack moniker in 2013.

=== Renovations during the 2010s ===
The Civic Center was renamed the XL Center in 2007. In September 2010, the arena was upgraded with a new center-hung scoreboard with four Sony Jumbotrons and a state-of-the-art sound system. The Connecticut State Legislature set aside $35 million in funding for improvements to the XL Center that began in early spring 2014 and completed in time for the start of the 2014–15 seasons of the Wolf Pack and UConn men's hockey in October. Improvements included upgrades to the mechanical system, locker rooms and concourse, replacing jumbotrons with a new HD video board, as well as aesthetic improvements such as a new bar area inside the arena and luxury seating in the lower bowl. A portion of the $35 million allocation went towards a study on the arena's long-term viability; either more major renovations or replacing it with a new facility.

=== 2023 Fanatics Sports Bar Addition ===
In September 2023, the arena (then known as the XL Center) opened the Fanatics Sports Bar and Sportsbook, a sports bar and legal sports wagering facility located within the arena. The sportsbook was constructed on the west side of the arena complex, above the venue’s loading and service docks. The venue officially opened on September 18, 2023, becoming one of the first in-arena sportsbook lounges in Connecticut.The space includes bar seating, lounge areas, large video displays for live sporting events.

The facility was developed as part of a broader series of arena amenity upgrades completed in the early 2020s. Unlike the major state-funded renovation completed in 2014 and the larger modernization project undertaken in 2025, the addition of the Fanatics Sports Bar and Sportsbook was implemented as a standalone enhancement focused on improving premium hospitality offerings and fan experience.

=== 2025 Overhaul and New Name ===
PeoplesBank Arena's exterior along Trumbull Street (2026)

The arena underwent a $145 million overhaul, including upgraded seating in the lower bowl, loge seating, concourse upgrades, an event level club, bunker suites, and back of the house upgrades, including an artists’ lounge, kitchen, and an upgraded locker room space for UConn. The arena was closed during renovations over the summer of 2025 and re-opened for a Wolf Pack game on October 17, 2025. On June 2, 2025, the XL Center was officially renamed PeoplesBank Arena as part of a 10-year naming partnership with PeoplesBank.

== Historical Events ==
=== NHL ===
- The 1986 NHL All Star Game
- The 1994 NHL entry draft

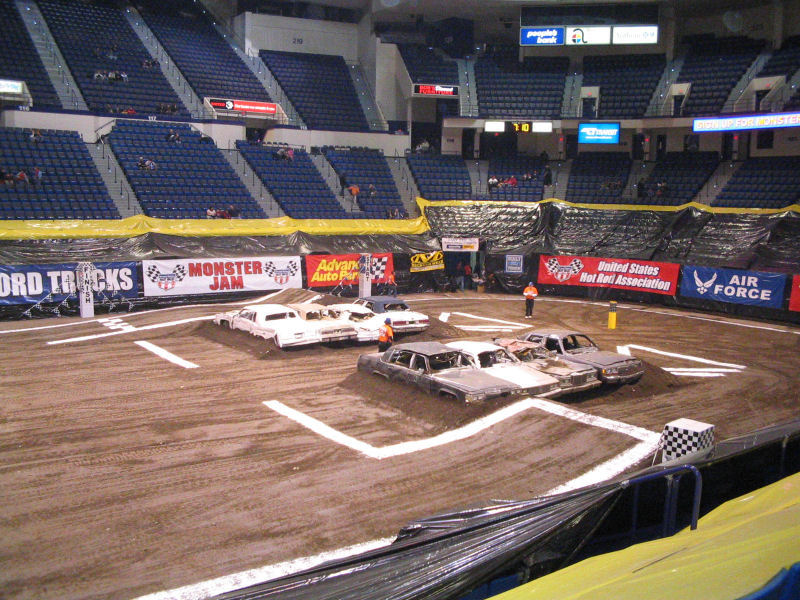
The arena set up for Monster Jam (before 2025 Renovation)

=== College Basketball ===
- The 1977 ECAC New England Region tournament took place at the Hartford Civic Center on March 3 and 5, 1977
- The 2015 and 2017 American Athletic Conference men's basketball tournament
- The 1982 Big East Conference and 1988–1990 America East Conference men's basketball tournaments
- The PeoplesBank Arena has hosted the NCAA Men's Tournament first and second round 6 times in 1983, 1985, 1988, 1990, 1998, 2019
- The PeoplesBank Arena has hosted the NCAA Women's Tournament first and second rounds in 2007 and the East Regional Final in 2004
- The Big East Conference Women's basketball tournament was held from 2004 to 2013.

=== Concerts ===
- Rock group the Grateful Dead performed at the arena twenty-one times. Several concerts were released in entirety on the live albums To Terrapin: Hartford '77, Dick's Picks Volume 6, Spring 1990 (The Other One), and Spring 1990 (album).
- Hard rock band Guns N' Roses performed at the Hartford Civic Center on March 9th, 1993 during their two-and-a-half year Use Your Illusion Tour. The Brian May Band opened.

=== Gymnastics ===
- The arena hosted the Kellogg's Tour of Gymnastics Champions in 2016.
- The Arena hosted the 2024 Core Hydration Classic Women's Gymnastics Meet in May 2024 in the lead up to the 2024 Paris Olympics
- The Arena hosted the 1980 USGF International Invitational, a replacement Gymnastics event for countries that participated in the 1980 US Olympic Boycott alongside the Liberty Bell Classic a track and field event in Philadelphia.

=== Other ===
- The 1977 WHA All-Star Game
- The PBR (Professional Bull Riders) made their first-ever visit to the PeoplesBank Arena for a Built Ford Tough Series (now known as the Unleash the Beast Series) event the weekend of October 7–9, 2011.
- The arena has hosted many professional wrestling events; including the 1990 Survivor Series (which saw the debut of popular wrestling legend The Undertaker), WrestleMania XI, 2000 No Way Out, 2004 Vengeance, and 2019 Money in the Bank. All Elite Wrestling's AEW Collision July 29, 2023, episode.
- Two Connecticut Sun games were played at PeoplesBank Arena during the 2026 season, the first on May 30 against the Los Angeles Sparks and the second on July 2 against the Dallas Wings.
- The Professional Women's Hockey League (PWHL) played a game at PeoplesBank Arena on March 12, 2027 between the New York Sirens and Ottawa Charge.

Basketball
Years	Capacity
1975–1979	11,000
1979–1987	15,134
1987–1989	16,016
1989–2014	16,294
2014–2023	15,564
2023–2025	15,684
2025–present	15,495

Hockey
Years	Capacity
1975–1979	10,507
1979–1980	14,460
1980–1982	14,510
1983–1985	14,817
1985–1987	15,126
1987–1989	15,223
1989–2014	15,635
2014–present	14,750

=== Boston Celtics ===
Boston Celtics games played at Hartford Civic Center
Date	Opponent	Result	Score	Game Type	Attendance
November 11, 1975	Atlanta Hawks	L	100–91	RS	10,591
December 17, 1975	Kansas City Kings	W	104–118	RS	11,243
January 13, 1976	Portland Trail Blazers	W	94–106	RS	11,243
March 9, 1976	New Orleans Jazz	L	117–99	RS	11,230
April 6, 1976	Cleveland Cavaliers	L	101–92	RS	11,243
October 28, 1976	Buffalo Braves	W	105–112	RS	10,608
January 11, 1977	Houston Rockets	W	101–105	RS	10,011
February 15, 1977	Detroit Pistons	W	99–109	RS	9,879
March 1, 1977	Golden State Warriors	L	101–94	RS	11,273
March 30, 1977	Chicago Bulls	W	88–90	RS	11,089
April 9, 1977	San Antonio Spurs	W	105–120	RS	10,859
October 25, 1977	Atlanta Hawks	W	103–110	RS	6,590
December 13, 1977	New Jersey Nets	W	108–122	RS	5,518
January 5, 1978	Phoenix Suns	L	121–111	RS	10,019
February 26, 1980	Atlanta Hawks	W	97–108	RS	15,622
March 18, 1980	Indiana Pacers	W	102–114	RS	15,622
October 23, 1980	New York Knicks	L	109–107	RS	12,941
November 9, 1980	Chicago Bulls	W	105–111	RS	8,627
December 7, 1980	Washington Bullets	L	113–103	RS	11,430
January 19, 1981	Detroit Pistons	W	90–92	RS	9,941
March 13, 1981	Indiana Pacers	L	101–94	RS	15,622
November 13, 1981	New Jersey Nets	W	97–11	RS	11,753
December 11, 1981	Atlanta Hawks	W	86–94	RS	13,369
January 10, 1982	Detroit Pistons	W	124–134	RS	15,429
November 30, 1982	Detroit Pistons	L	123–116	RS	11,762
January 31, 1983	Chicago Bulls	W	104–110	RS	12,742
March 7, 1983	New Jersey Nets	W	114–121	RS	15,165
December 9, 1983	Denver Nuggets	W	90–119	RS	13,374
January 20, 1984	Indiana Pacers	W	125–132	RS	13,134
March 2, 1984	Chicago Bulls	W	100–104	RS	14,529
December 11, 1984	New Jersey Nets	W	121–130	RS	13,357
January 29, 1985	Detroit Pistons	W	130–131	RS	15,685
February 22, 1985	Chicago Bulls	W	105–115	RS	15,685
December 10, 1985	Atlanta Hawks	W	110–114	RS	14,493
February 23, 1986	Indiana Pacers	W	98–113	RS	15,124
March 18, 1986	Cleveland Cavaliers	W	96–126	RS	15,134
December 2, 1986	Washington Bullets	L	117–109	RS	15,134
February 23, 1987	New Jersey Nets	W	103–116	RS	15,134
March 24, 1987	Cleveland Cavaliers	W	88–111	RS	15,134
November 23, 1987	Chicago Bulls	L	107–102	RS	15,134
February 22, 1988	New York Knicks	W	93–95	RS	15,134
March 11, 1988	Indiana Pacers	W	112–122	RS	15,134
November 22, 1988	Cleveland Cavaliers	L	114–102	RS	15,239
February 24, 1989	Milwaukee Bucks	W	112–125	RS	15,239
March 13, 1989	New Jersey Nets	W	91–114	RS	15,239
November 14, 1989	Philadelphia 76ers	W	94–96	RS	15,239
February 6, 1990	Milwaukee Bucks	L	119–106	RS	15,239
March 9, 1990	Washington Bullets	L	115–108	RS	15,239
November 26, 1990	Miami Heat	W	101–118	RS	15,239
February 22, 1991	New Jersey Nets	W	99–111	RS	15,239
March 4, 1991	Indiana Pacers	W	101–126	RS	15,239
November 25, 1991	Washington Bullets	W	108–121	RS	14,678
February 21, 1992	Charlotte Hornets	W	110–113	RS	15,239
March 13, 1992	New Jersey Nets	L	110–108	RS	15,239
November 23, 1992	Atlanta Hawks	L	101–97	RS	13,299
February 9, 1993	Milwaukee Bucks	W	92–104	RS	14,137
March 28, 1993	Washington Bullets	W	113–114	RS	15,239
November 22, 1993	Indiana Pacers	L	102–71	RS	13,200
February 17, 1994	New Jersey Nets	L	117–98	RS	12,588
March 27, 1994	Philadelphia 76ers	W	122–124	RS	13,259
November 22, 1994	Milwaukee Bucks	L	116–94	RS	12,829
February 23, 1995	Orlando Magic	W	117–119	RS	15,242
April 15, 1995	Detroit Pistons	W	104–129	RS	12,979
October 14, 2009	Toronto Raptors	W	90–106	PS	10,117
October 16, 2010	New York Knicks	W	84–97	PS	15,138
October 13, 2012	New York Knicks	L	98–95	PS	14,218
October 8, 2014	New York Knicks	W	86–106	PS	8,462

=== International Women's basketball games ===
Date	Opponent	Result	Home	Game Type	Attendance
January 27, 2020	United States	79–64	UConn Huskies	Exhibition	13,919

=== International hockey games ===
Date	Away	Score	Home	Attendance
December 27, 1976	Soviet Union	2–5	(United States) New England Whalers	—
August 28, 1987	Finland	1–4	United States	8,508
September 4, 1987	Soviet Union	5–1	United States	14,838
January 7, 1989	CSKA Moscow (Soviet Union)	6–3	(United States) Hartford Whalers	—
December 27, 1989	Krylya Sovetov Moscow (Soviet Union)	3–4 (OT)	(United States) Hartford Whalers	—
January 3, 1991	Dynamo Moscow (Soviet Union)	0–0	(United States) Hartford Whalers	—
December 14, 2019	Canada	1–4	United States	7,126

=== UConn Huskies ===
The PeoplesBank Arena serves as the second home for the University of Connecticut's men's and women's basketball programs. At the start of the 2014–15 season the UConn men's ice hockey program moved to the XL Center as a condition of its joining Hockey East. In September 2018, the UConn Board of Trustees approved a plan to build a new 2,500-seat arena in Storrs with the option to expand to 3,500 seats if necessary. Though Hockey East requires arenas to hold at least 4,000, UConn received a waiver for the project since the expectation is for the Huskies' men's hockey program to continue to play some of its games at the XL Center in Hartford.

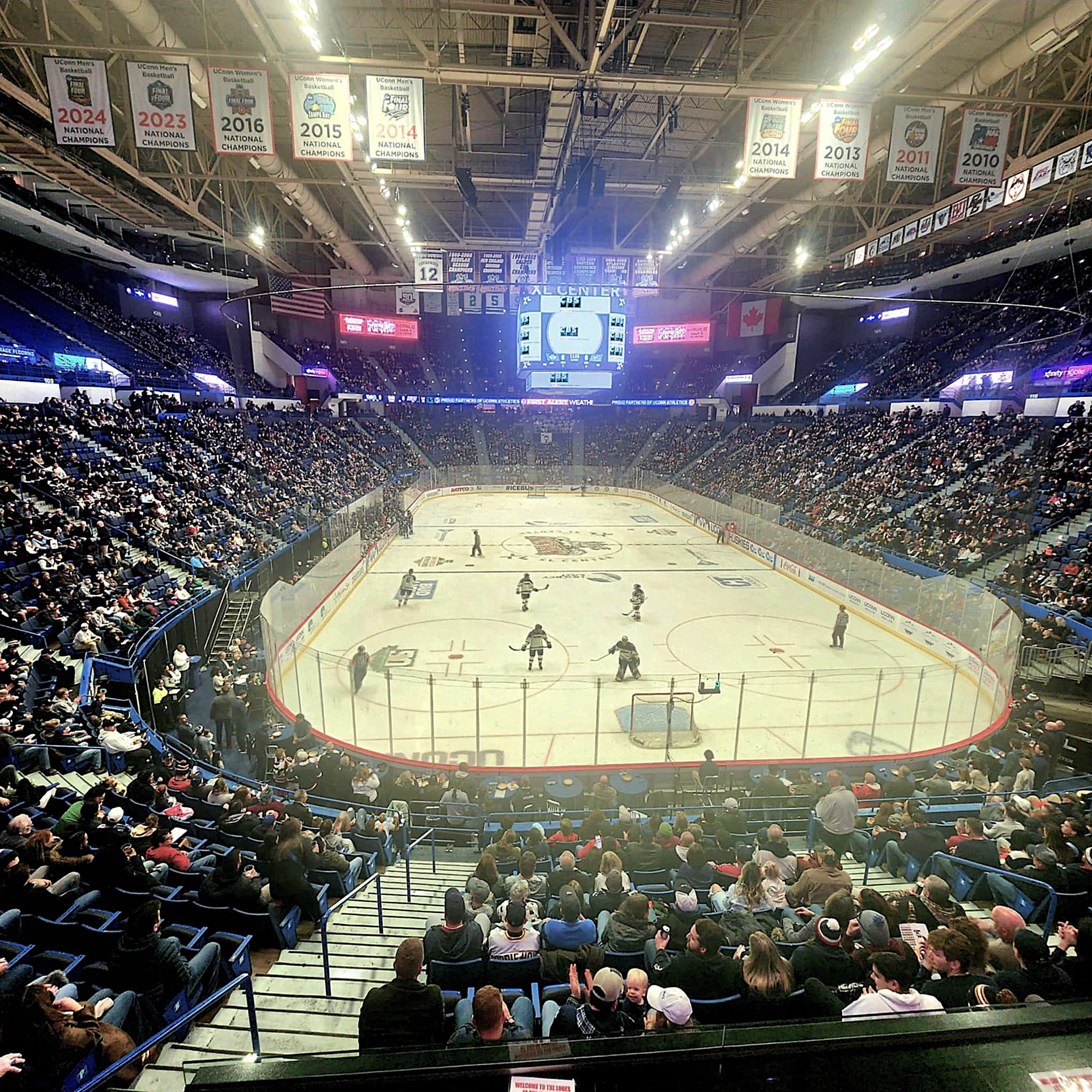
Record Breaking Crowd During UConn Hockey game vs Providence on February 1, 2025 (before 2025 Renovation)

==== UConn Hockey attendance records ====
Date	Opponent	Result	Attendance
February 1, 2025	#7 Providence	L 6–3	11,781
February 21, 2026	#12 Boston College	L 2–1^{OT}	10,494
February 9, 2019	Merrimack	W 5–0	8,211
November 15, 2014	#3 Boston College	W 1–0	8,089
November 22, 2014	#3 Boston University	L 2–5	7,712

== Exhibition center and Mall ==
The Exhibition Center consisted of a 68,855-square-foot (6,397 m^{2}) exhibit hall, a 16,080-square-foot (1,494 m^{2}) assembly hall that could divide into two meeting rooms, plus seven meeting rooms totaling 7,390 square feet (687 m^{2}) and two lobbies totaling 6,100 square feet (570 m^{2}). It was used for trade shows, conventions, banquets, meetings and other events.

The surrounding shopping mall was demolished in 2004 and was replaced by street-level retail shops and a 36-story residential tower named Hartford 21 which opened in 2006 and is the tallest residential tower between New York City and Boston.

As part of the 2025 Renovation the Exhibition center- made obsolete by the 2005 construction of the Connecticut Convention Center- was converted to office space to free up room for the new event level clubs, suites, and new locker rooms.

== Transportation ==
The arena is serviced by CT Transit local city routes 60, 62, 64, 66, 72, 74, and 76; CT Fastrak routes 101, 102, and 128; and CT Transit express routes 902, 909, 923, and 928.

It is also a ten minute walk from Hartford Union Station, allowing for train service from New Haven or Springfield.

== See also ==
- List of NCAA Division I basketball arenas

== Notes ==
Events and tenants
Preceded by Boston Garden; Springfield Civic Center	Home of the New England / Hartford Whalers; 1974–1978; 1980–1997	Succeeded by Springfield Civic Center; Greensboro Coliseum
Preceded by Madison Square Garden	Home of the New England Sea Wolves; 1999–2000	Succeeded by Air Canada Centre
Preceded by Olympic Saddledome	Host of NHL All-Star Game; 1986	Succeeded by St. Louis Arena
Preceded by Broome County Veterans Memorial Arena	Home of the Hartford Wolf Pack/Connecticut Whale; 1997–present	Succeeded by Current Arena
Preceded by Madison Square Garden	Host of WrestleMania; 1995	Succeeded by Arrowhead Pond of Anaheim
