= Harrison & Abramovitz =

American architectural firm (1941–1976)

- Type: Private company
- Industry: Architecture
- Founded: 1941
- Founder: Wallace Harrison; J. André Fouilhoux; Max Abramovitz
- Defunct: 1976
- Headquarters: New York, New York, U.S.

Harrison & Abramovitz (also known as Harrison, Fouilhoux & Abramovitz; Harrison, Abramovitz, & Abbe; and Harrison, Abramovitz, & Harris) was an American architectural firm based in New York and active from 1941 through 1976. The firm was a partnership of Wallace Harrison and Max Abramovitz.

== History ==
The firm, founded in 1941 by Wallace Harrison (1895–1981), J. André Fouilhoux (1879–1945), Max Abramovitz (1908–2004), was best known for modernist corporate towers on the East coast and Midwestern cities. Most are straightforward. One notable stylistic innovation was the use of stamped metal panels on the facade, first at the 1953 Alcoa Building in Pittsburgh, and repeated at the 1953 Republic Center Tower I in Dallas and the 1956 former Socony-Mobil Building at 150 East 42nd Street in New York City.

The firm's first significant project was the United Nations headquarters in New York City (1947–52).

Both Harrison and Abramovitz were design architects and worked independently. Some projects are clearly attributable to one or the other: for instance the buildings at University of Illinois at Urbana–Champaign, Abramovitz's alma mater, are his designs. Harrison's work at the Empire State Plaza "commanded his attention almost exclusively" for 15 years, from 1962 through 1976, which implies the other work of the partnership in that period is primarily attributable to Abramovitz. After 1976 Abramovitz partnered with others.

=== Also known by ===
The firm was also known as Harrison, Fouilhoux & Abramovitz from 1941 through Fouilhoux's death in 1945, then as Harrison, Abramovitz, & Abbe, and finally as Harrison, Abramovitz, & Harris. The partnership was dissolved in 1976, and replaced by Abramovitz, Harris & Kingsland.

== Works ==
The firm's credits include:

- Rockefeller Apartments (1936)
- Corning Museum of Glass, Corning, New York (1951)
- 525 William Penn Place, Downtown Pittsburgh, Pennsylvania (1951)
- Regional Enterprise Tower, originally the Alcoa Building, Downtown Pittsburgh, Pennsylvania (1953)
- Republic Center Tower I, Dallas, Texas (1953)
- Embassy of the United States, Havana, Havana, Cuba (1953)
- Socony-Mobil Building, 150 East 42nd Street, NYC (1956)
- Commercial Credit Company Building, Baltimore (1957)
- Morningside Gardens, New York, NY (1957)
- 129 West Trade, Charlotte, North Carolina (1958)
- Several projects for Brandeis University, including the general Master Plan (1950s), Three Chapels (1955), Slosberg Music Center (1957), Pearlman Hall (1957), Goldfarb Library (1959), Wien Faculty Center (1959), Rose Art Museum (1961), Rapaporte Treasure Hall (1965), Spingold Theater (1965), and Sachar International Center
- Daily News Building expansion, Manhattan, New York (1960)
- Chase Tower, Milwaukee, Wisconsin (1961)
- Springs Mills Building (Charles H. Abbe, chief designer), 104 West 40th Street, New York (1961–63)
- Jerome L. Greene Hall, Columbia Law School, New York City (1961)
- United Nations Dag Hammarskjöld Library Building, New York (1961)
- Continental Can Building, New York City (1961)
- General site planning and Plaza for Lincoln Center for the Performing Arts, New York (1961–1966)
- David Geffen Hall (Formerly Avery Fisher Hall, and opened as Philharmonic Hall) at the Lincoln Center for the Performing Arts, New York (1962)
- Assembly Hall, University of Illinois at Urbana–Champaign (1963)
- Erieview Tower, Cleveland, Ohio (1964)
- New York Hall of Science, Flushing, New York (1964)
- Columbus Center, Columbus, Ohio (1964)
- Metropolitan Opera House at the Lincoln Center for the Performing Arts, New York (1966)
- Main Place Tower, Buffalo, New York (1969)
- PNC Center, Akron, Ohio (1969)
- Fifth Third Center, Cincinnati, Ohio (1969)
- Fiberglas Tower, Toledo, Ohio (1970)
- School of International and Public Affairs, Columbia University, New York City (1970)
- U.S. Steel Tower, originally the USX Tower, the tallest building in Downtown Pittsburgh, Pennsylvania (1970)
- 11 Stanwix Street, originally the Westinghouse Tower, Downtown Pittsburgh, Pennsylvania (1970)
- CIA Original Headquarters Building, Langley, Virginia (1961)
- National City Tower, Louisville, Kentucky (1972)
- Borden Building, Columbus, Ohio (1973)
- Learning Research and Development Center, University of Pittsburgh (1974)

== Gallery ==
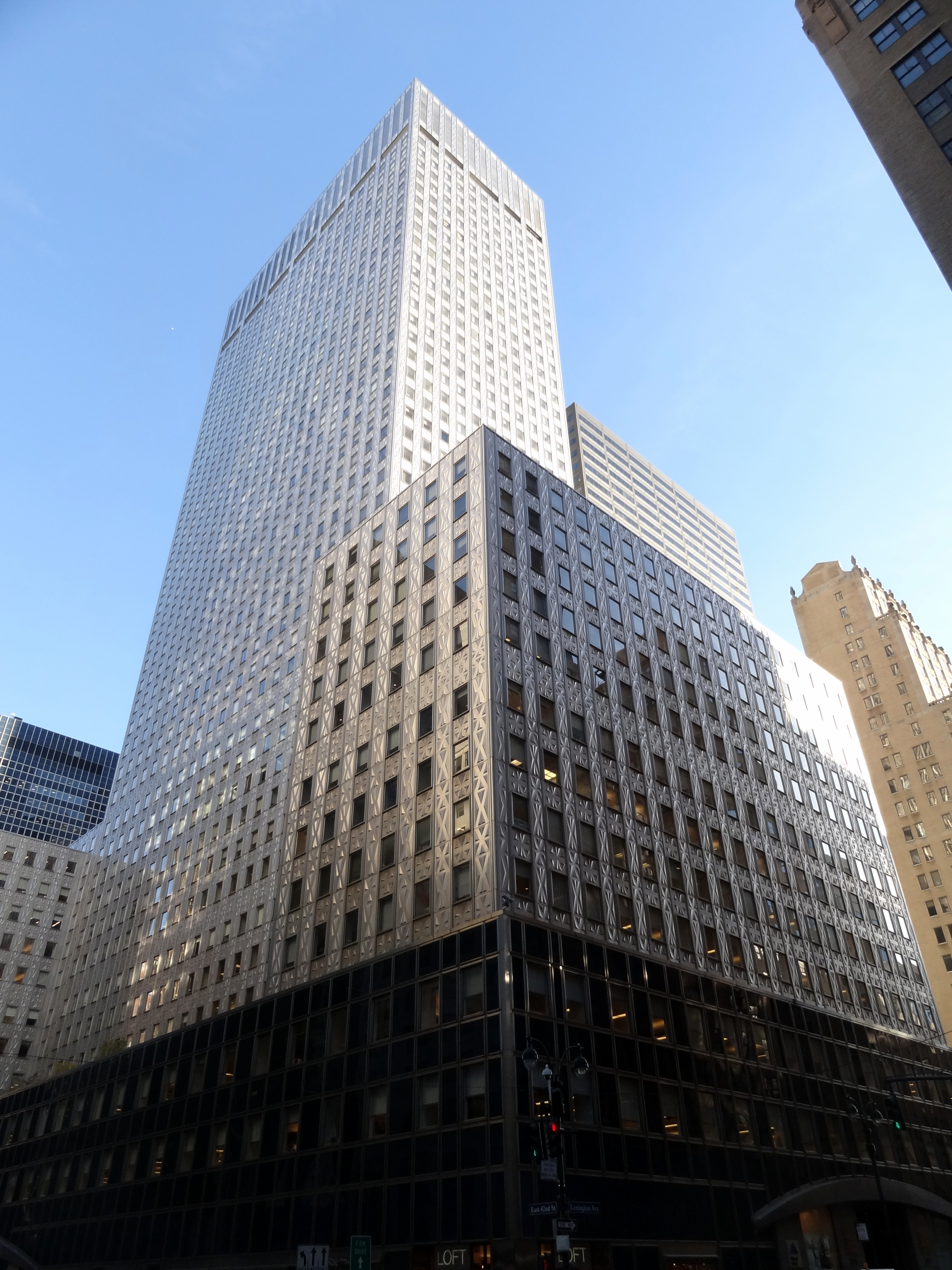
Socony-Mobil Building, New York City, 1956

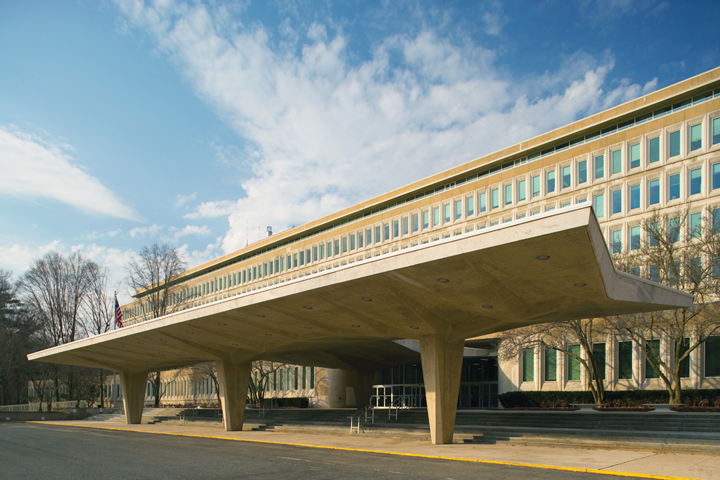
CIA Original Headquarters Building at Langley, Virginia, 1961

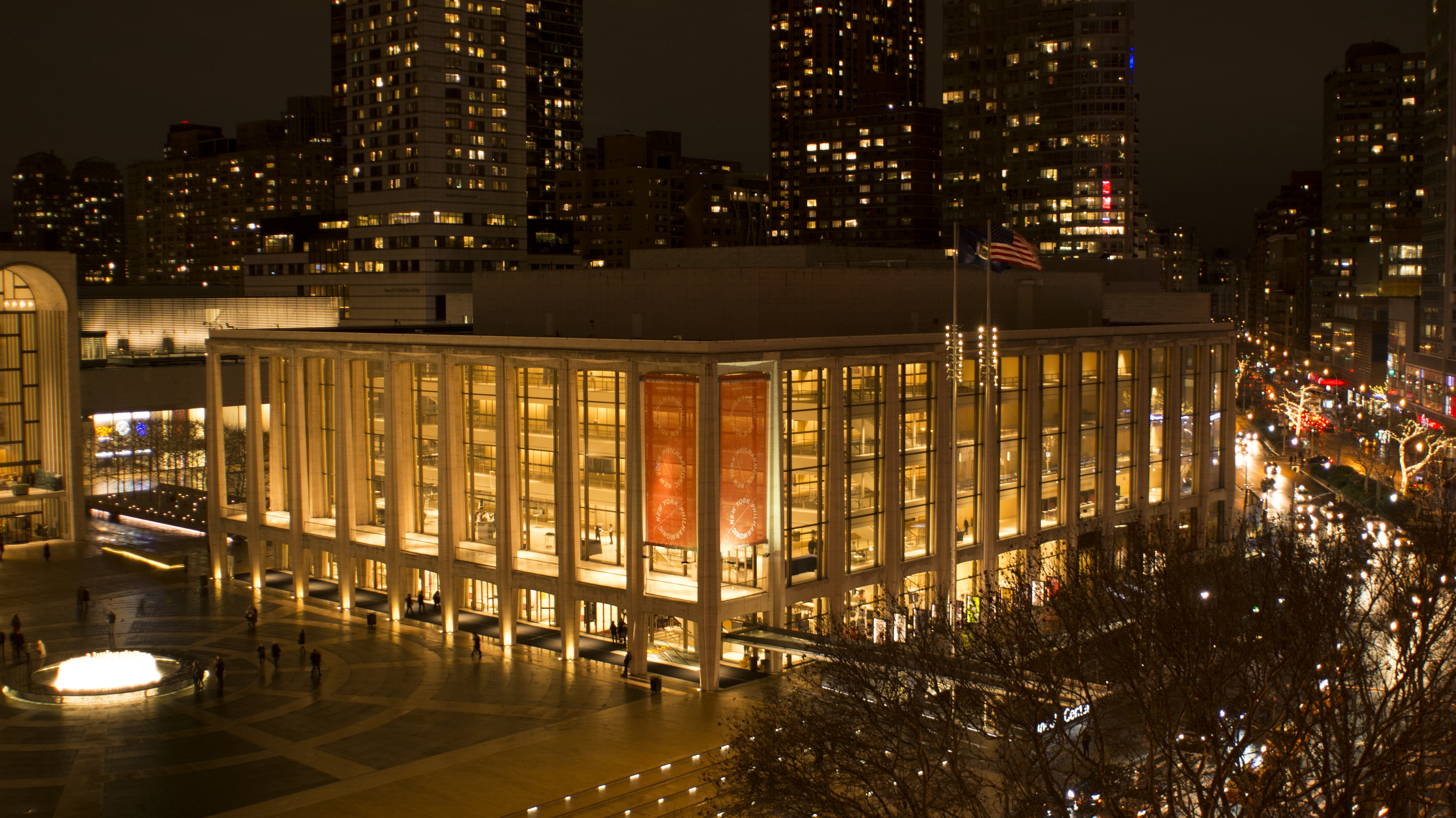
Philharmonic Hall, Lincoln Center for the Performing Arts, 1962

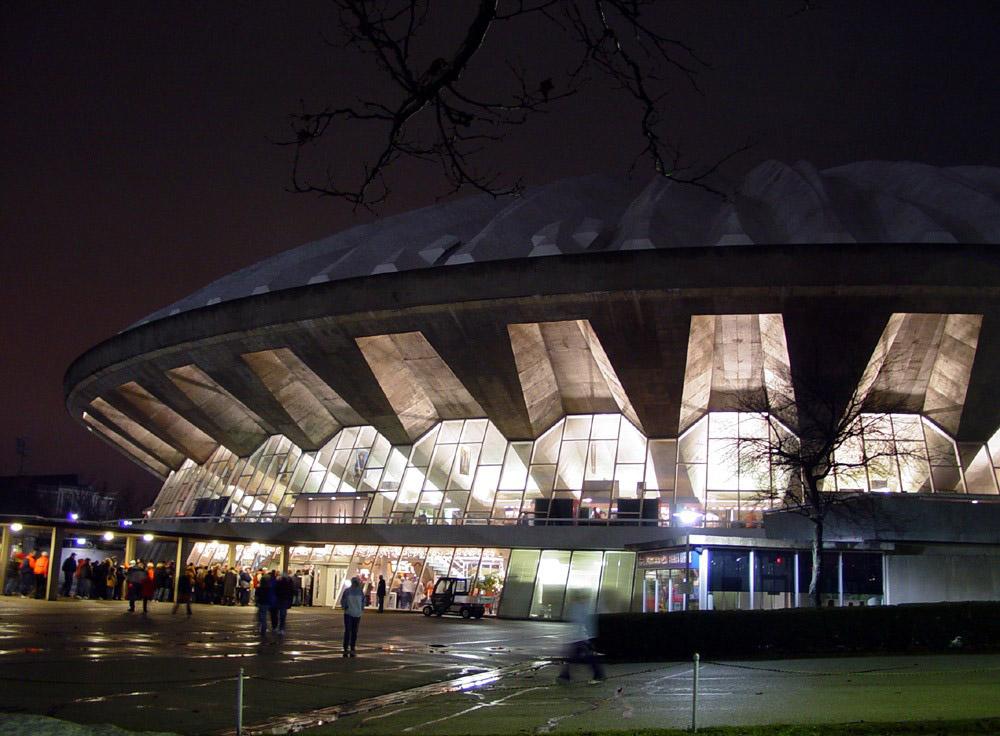
Assembly Hall, University of Illinois at Urbana–Champaign, 1963

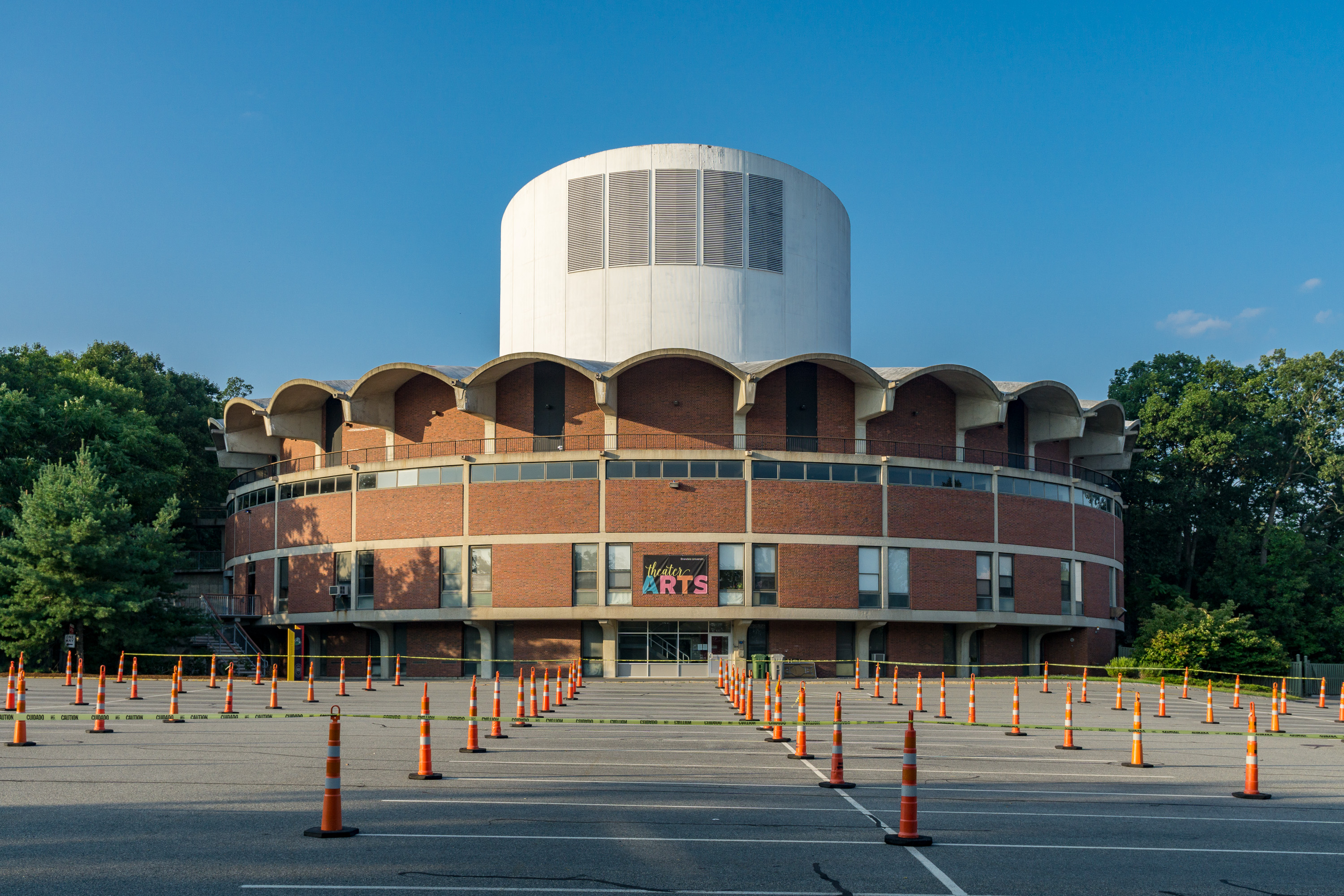
Spingold Theater Center, Brandeis University, 1965

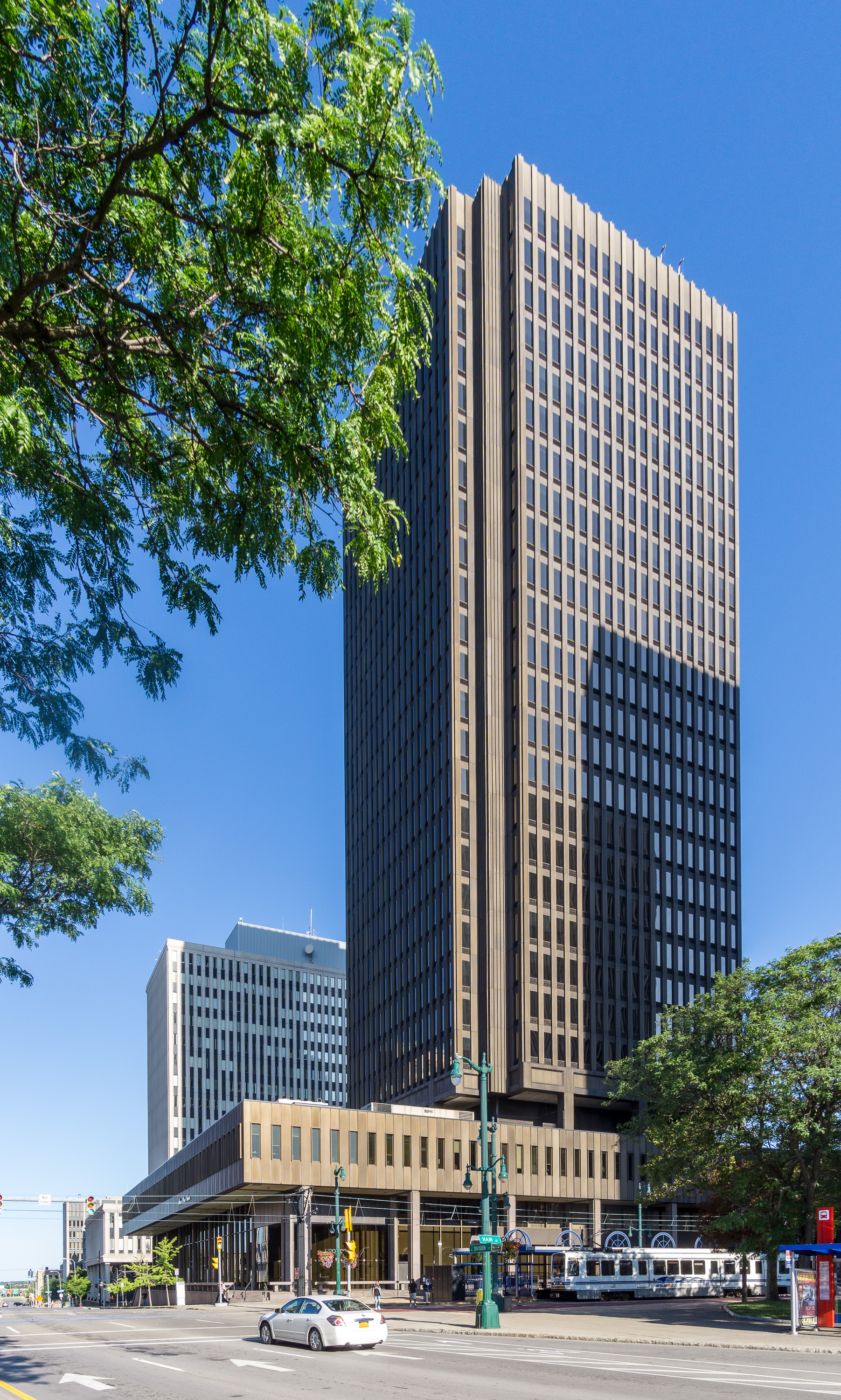
Main Place Tower, Buffalo, New York, 1969
