= Commercial Credit Company Building =

Historic building in Baltimore, Maryland, USA

- U.S. National Register of Historic Places
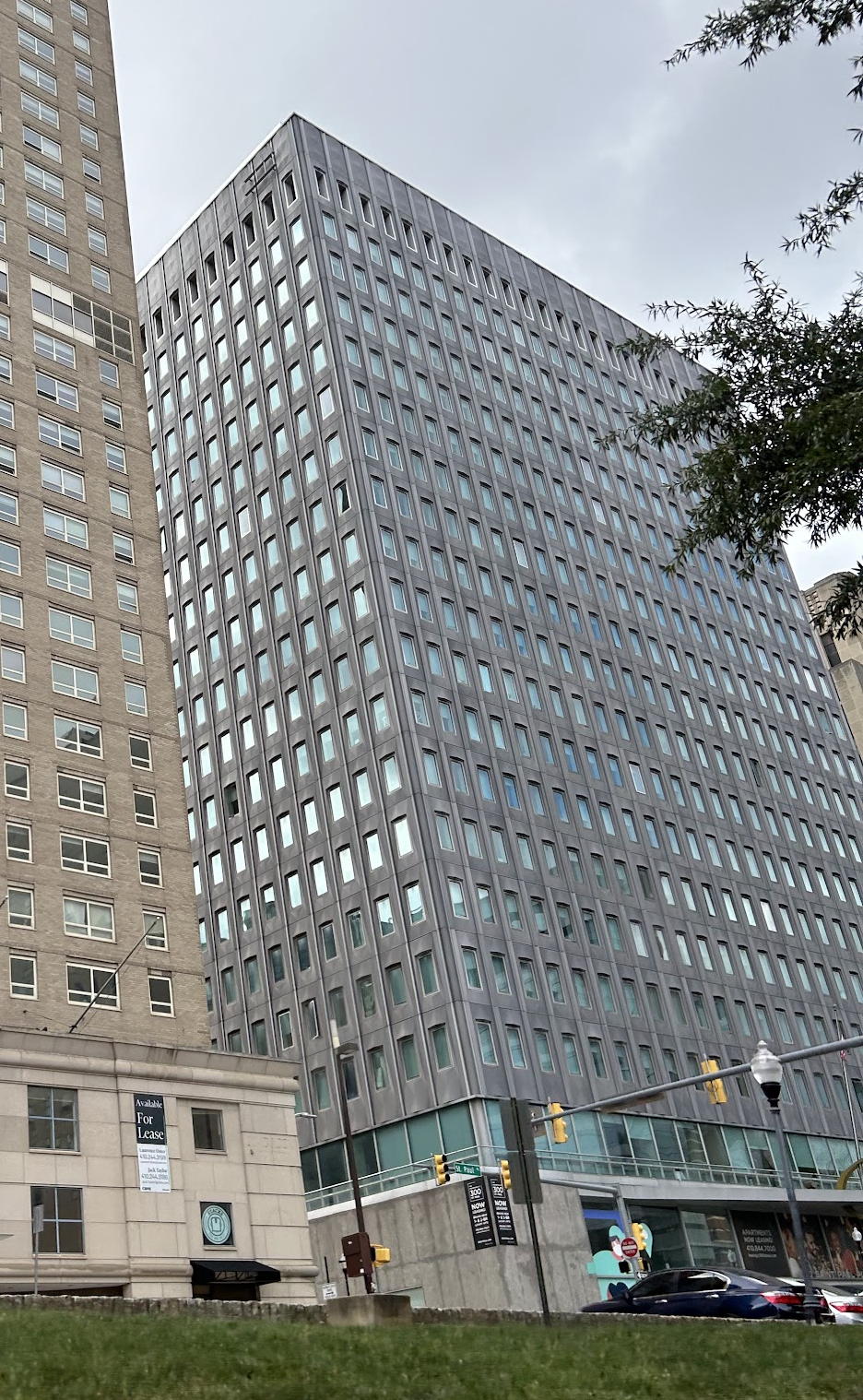
- 300 St. Paul Place in 2024

- Location within Baltimore Location within Maryland Location within the United States
- Location: 300-314 St. Paul Pl. Baltimore, Maryland
- Coordinates: 39°17′34″N 76°36′51″W
- Area: less than one acre
- Built: 1954-1957
- Built by: Edwards and Hjorth
- Architect: Harrison and Abramovitz
- Architectural style: Modern
- NRHP reference No.: 100002331
- Added to NRHP: April 17, 2018

The Commercial Credit Company Building, also known as The Residences at 300 St. Paul, is a historic building located in Baltimore, Maryland, United States. It is significant as the first post-World War II office building constructed in the city, its associations with the Commercial Credit Company who commissioned it, and the New York City architectural firm Harrison and Abramovitz who designed it.

Construction on the Modernist structure began in 1954 and it was completed three years later. Edwards and Hjorth were the general contractors. The property is located on a steep slope. The eastern section of the building is 19-stories, with a five-story section in the middle and a two-story section on its west elevation. The base of the building is composed of a Deer Isle granite with a glazed aluminum curtain wall in the center. The upper floors are slightly recessed from the base and are clad in grey aluminum panels.

Commercial Credit Company continued to own the building until 1989. It has subsequently been converted into apartments. The building was listed on the National Register of Historic Places in 2018.
