= Civic Center Mall =

Shopping mall and office complex in Connecticut, US

Coordinates: 41.7685°N 72.6771°W

The Civic Center Mall, located in downtown Hartford, was a three level, enclosed shopping mall and office complex built in 1975 as part of a large downtown urban redevelopment project. It was previously the commercial portion of a four block square megastructure-type development, The Hartford Civic Center complex, which also contains a multi-purpose coliseum, an exhibition and trade show center, structured parking and a 330-room Sheraton (now Hilton) hotel.

== Stores ==
The mall featured approximately fifty small shops and restaurants and was initially anchored by a new specialty department store, Luettgen's Ltd, created and operated by William Luettgen, who was previously the president of local department store chain, G. Fox & Co. This anchor space was later split.

The mall contained a number of unique and national specialty shops such as a Hartford Whalers Team Store, Al Franklin's Musical World, B. Dalton Bookseller, Ann Taylor and Koenig Art Emporium. A third level contained about 65,000 square feet (6,000 m^{2}) of office space, overlooking both the mall interior and the adjacent streets.

== Architecture ==
Architecturally, the mall reflected the brutalist and insular character of many early 1970s megastructure-type projects. The exterior of the L-shaped mall was constructed of prefabricated concrete panels and was surrounded by overscaled concrete landscape planter beds that cut off any facade to the sidewalk.

== History ==
Built and operated by the Hartford-based insurance company Aetna, and called "the bunker" by its critics, the mall was moderately successful in its early years, and was an economic catalyst that for a time stabilized the decline of the downtown retail district in Hartford. Its construction was also partially credited with kicking off the office building boom that began in the late 1970s and would eventually add nearly five million square feet of new office space in the area over the following decade.

By the late 1980s and early 1990s, the mall faced competition from the nearby newly constructed Westfarms (which opened the same year as Civic Center Mall) and The Shoppes at Buckland Hills malls. Given its limited size, the accelerating decline in the downtown retail district and the severe recession in the regional economy by the early 1990s, many of the mall's tenants left or ceased operations and the mall fell into severe decline, this also coincided with the move of the Whalers to North Carolina to become the Carolina Hurricanes in 1997. By 1998 the project's viability was in doubt, and Aetna was stating that it had lost more than $56 million on the project since its opening.

== Redevelopment ==
In 2004 Northland Investment Corporation, the State of Connecticut, the City of Hartford, and Aetna began working to redevelop the former Civic Center Mall complex. The project, called Hartford 21, replaced the aging retail, office and restaurant mall portion of the Hartford Civic Center Coliseum with a new, contemporary-styled residential, retail and entertainment complex. The portion of original mall at the corner of Trumbull and Asylum Streets, which had originally contained the anchor stores and food court, was demolished and redevelopment starting in 2004 and reaching substantial completion in the summer of 2006.

The project included a new 36-story residential tower with 262 luxury apartments, 45,000 square feet (4,200 m^{2}) of sidewalk-oriented retail space and |90,000 square feet (8,400 m^{2}) of office space, at the corner of Trumbull and Asylum Streets. The portion of the mall fronting Asylum Street, was converted into street-level retail on the ground floor, with the upper levels converted into a parking deck for the residential tower. The original below-grade parking garage occupying the basement levels of the mall remains in use for public and coliseum event parking. The portion fronting Trumbull street, including the atrium for the coliseum, remains largely intact, although the facade has been rebuilt in modern theme, providing access to retail spaces from the street. The food court had occupied the basement level of the demolished portion of the mall.
