= Capital Region Development Authority =

Quasi-public state agency in Connecticut, US

Agency overview
- Formed: 2014
- Preceding agency: Capital City Economic Development Authority (CCEDA)
- Jurisdiction: City of Hartford
- Headquarters: 100 Columbus Blvd., Suite 500, Hartford, CT 06103
- Agency executives: Michael Freimuth, Executive Director; Anthony L. Lazzaro, Deputy Director & General Counsel
- Website: crdact.net

The Capital Region Development Authority (CRDA), previously known as the Capital City Economic Development Authority (CCEDA), is a quasi-public state agency in Connecticut, responsible for promoting residential and economic development in and around the downtown district of the capital city of Hartford. The agency in its current form was organized by CT Public Act 12–147 in 2012, and consists of a 14-member board of governors supported by a professional staff. The CRDA owns and operates the Connecticut Convention Center, and manages the PeoplesBank Arena under a lease with the City of Hartford, and various other facilities. It provides financing and logistical support for residential and commercial development within the city, in particular adaptive reuse of existing buildings.
