= Dark Night =

Dark Night may refer to:

- "Dark Is the Night" (Soviet song) ("Tyomnaya noch"), a song by Nikita Bogoslovsky
- Dark Night (2005 film), a 2005 short film by Leonid Prudovsky
- Dark Night (2016 film), a 2016 American film
- The Dark Night (film), a 1989 Spanish film
- "Dark Night" (song), a song by The Blasters
- "The Dark Night", an episode of the TV series Gossip Girl

== See also ==
- Dark Night of the Soul, a metaphor for a phase of one's spiritual life
- Dark Is the Night (disambiguation)
- Dark Knight (disambiguation)
- Black Knight (disambiguation)
- Darkest Night (disambiguation)
- Darkest Knight
- Blackest Night
