= Darkest Night =

Darkest Night may refer to:

== Music ==
- "Darkest Night", a song on the 1995 album The Biz by The Sea and Cake
- "Darkest Night", a song on the 2001 album Green Room Blues by Deluxtone Rockets
- "Darkest Night", a song on the 2003 album Nazarene Crying Towel by Lost Dogs
- "Darkest Night", a song on the 2005 album Shadows Are Security by As I Lay Dying

== Other uses ==
- Darkest Night (film), a 2012 horror film
- "Darkest Night", an episode of the fan film series Star Trek: Hidden Frontier (Episode 3, Season 5)
- Darkest Night, a 2017 novel from the Warriors: A Vision of Shadows series by Erin Hunter
- Darkest Night, the title of the original webcomic release of The Deep Dark by Lee Knox Ostertag
- Darkest Night (podcast), a horror and science fiction podcast

== See also ==
- Darkest Knight, a 1996 Star Wars novel by Kevin J. Anderson
- Dark Knight (disambiguation)
- Black Knight (disambiguation)
- Dark Night (disambiguation)
- Blackest Night, an American comic book
- Black Night, a song by Deep Purple
