= Dark Knight =

Dark Knight may refer to:

== Batman franchise media ==
=== Batman comics ===
- Dark Knight, a nickname for the DC Comics superhero Batman
- Batman: The Dark Knight, a monthly comic book series written by David Finch from 2011 to 2014
- Batman: The Dark Knight, a 1986 miniseries by Frank Miller collected in the graphic novel The Dark Knight Returns
- Batman: Legends of the Dark Knight, a monthly comic book series from 1989 to 2007

=== Batman films ===
- The Dark Knight trilogy of Christopher Nolan films:
  - Batman Begins, 2005
  - The Dark Knight, 2008
  - The Dark Knight Rises, 2012
- Batman: DarKnight, an undeveloped Batman film proposed in 1998

=== Batman music ===
- The Dark Knight (soundtrack), the soundtrack album to the 2008 film

=== Batman games ===
- Batman: The Dark Knight (video game), a cancelled video game based on the 2008 film

=== Batman attractions ===
- The Dark Knight Coaster, a roller coaster at several Six Flags parks
- Batman: The Dark Knight (roller coaster), a roller coaster at Six Flags New England

== Other uses ==
- Dark Knight, a 1991 novel by Roger Elwood
- The Dark Knight, a 2012 novel by Elizabeth Elliott
- Dark Knight (TV series) or Fantasy Quest, a medieval adventure TV series featuring Todd Rippon
- "Dark Knight" (Forever Knight), a 1992 television episode
- Black knight, a literary stock character
- "The Dark Knight of Gotham", nickname for Matt Harvey, Major League Baseball pitcher for the New York Mets
- TrES-2b, an extrasolar planet nicknamed "Dark Knight", as it reflects less than 1% of the light that hits it
- Citizen Vigilante, a 2026 film originally titled The Dark Knight

== See also ==
- Black Knight (disambiguation)
- Dark Night (disambiguation)
- Darkest Night (disambiguation)
- Darkest Knight
