= Groton Public Schools =

Public school system in Groton, Connecticut

Location
- Groton, CT United States

District information
- Type: Public
- Grades: K-12
- Superintendent: Susan Austin

Students and staff
- Students: 4,046
- Teachers: 336
- Student–teacher ratio: 12:1

Other information
- Website: www.grotonschools.org

Groton Public Schools (GPS, Groton School District) is a school district in New London County, Connecticut based in the city of Groton, Connecticut, United States. The Groton Public School District services approximately 4,000 students from the City of Groton, Town of Groton, Groton Long Point, Noank, and West Mystic areas. The school district includes students of families who are employed at General Dynamics Electric Boat, Pfizer, and US Navy Submarine Base NLON. Due to the military population, a large number of students move in and out of the school district due to military transfers.

Groton students who continue on to college have many options locally, in addition to the traditional choices. The Groton school district maintains close ties with nearby colleges. Nearby colleges include Three Rivers Community College in Norwich CT; Mitchell College in New London, CT; Connecticut College in New London, CT; and University of Connecticut - Avery Point Campus in Groton, CT.

== High schools ==
- Robert E. Fitch High School

== Middle schools ==
- Groton Middle School

== Elementary schools ==
- Catherine Kolnaski Elementary Magnet School
- Charles Barnum Elementary School
- Thames River Magnet Elementary School
- Mystic River Magnet Elementary School
- Northeast Academy Arts Magnet Elementary School

== Former schools ==
These have been schools that have been operated at one time in the past by the school district, but have been removed from service. Many are still in use in Groton for storage of school equipment, polling locations, or office space.

- Robert E. Fitch Middle School (closed Summer 2012, district consolidated to two Middle Schools)
- West Side Middle School (Closed Summer 2020)
- Carl C. Cutler Middle School (Closed Summer 2020)
- Northeast School (closed Summer 1977 now location of Groton Board of Education offices)
- Freeman Hathaway School (closed 1993, demolished in 2007 and current location of Northeast Academy)
- Noank Elementary School (Closed December 2007)
- Eastern Point Elementary School (Opened 1902, Closed Summer 2008 and demolished in Spring 2009, location now home of Marine Science Magnet High School)
- Groton Heights Elementary School (Closed Summer 2007)
- Colonel Ledyard Elementary School (Closed Winter 2007)
- William Seeley Elementary School (Closed Summer 2002)
- Mystic Academy (building renovated and now location of "Academy Point At Mystic" assisted living community.)
- Claude Chester Elementary School (Closed Summer 2021)
- Mary Morrisson Elementary School (Closed Summer 2021)
- S.B. Butler Elementary School (Closed Summer 2021). Sylvester B. Butler was Superintendent of Groton School District until his retirement in 1956.
- Pleasant Valley Elementary School (Closed Summer 2018)

== Other schools in district boundaries ==
These schools fall within the school district's coverage area, but are not part of the school district

- Sacred Heart School (Roman Catholic school privately owned and run by Sacred Heart Parish)
- Ella T Grasso Technical High School (vocational High School part of the Connecticut Technical High School System)
