= Black Night (disambiguation) =

"Black Night" is a 1970 song by Deep Purple.

Black Night may also refer to:

- "Black Night" (Charles Brown song), 1951 song by Charles Brown
- "Black Night" (Stratovarius song), 1989 song by Stratovarius
- "Black Raat" (lit. 'Black Night'), a song by Guru Randhawa from Man of the Moon, 2022

== See also ==
- Blacknight, a pseudonym used exclusively by Cliff Richard to launch a remixed version of his single "Can't Keep this Feeling In" as a pre-release
- Black knight (disambiguation)
