= George Hall (American football) =

American football player (born 1984)

Profile
- Position: Linebacker

Personal information
- Born: August 2, 1984 (age 42); Groton, Connecticut
- Listed height: 6 ft 2 in (1.88 m)
- Listed weight: 250 lb (113 kg)

Career information
- High school: Groton (CT) Fitch Senior
- College: Purdue
- NFL draft: 2007: undrafted

Career history
- Minnesota Vikings (2007)*; Columbus Destroyers (2008)
- * Offseason or practice squad member only

Career NFL statistics
- Tackles: 0

Career AFL statistics as of 3/29/2012
- Tackles: 3
- Stats at ArenaFan.com

George Alfred Hall Jr. (born August 2, 1984) is an American former professional football linebacker who played for the Columbus Destroyers of the Arena Football League. He previously signed with the Minnesota Vikings of the National Football League (NFL), but was released without playing a game.

== Early life ==
College recruiting
Name	Hometown	School	Height	Weight	40^{‡}	Commit date
George Hall; DE	Groton, Connecticut	Fitch Senior High School	6 ft 2 in (1.88 m)	240 lb (110 kg)	4.6	Oct 5, 2001
George Hall; DE	Recruit ratings: Scout: Rivals:					
Overall recruit ranking: Scout: -- (RB) Rivals: 37 (DE), -- (CT)
‡ Refers to 40-yard dash; Note: In many cases, Scout, Rivals, 247Sports, On3, and ESPN may conflict in their listings of height, weight and 40 time.; In these cases, the average was taken. ESPN grades are on a 100-point scale.; Sources: "2007 Team Ranking". Rivals.com.

Hall committed to Purdue University on October 5, 2001. Hall wasn't heavily recruited as he didn't receive any other FBS scholarship offers.

== College years ==
He played college football at Purdue.

== See also ==
- List of Arena Football League and National Football League players
