= Edward Yeomans House =

Historic house in Connecticut, United States

- U.S. National Register of Historic Places
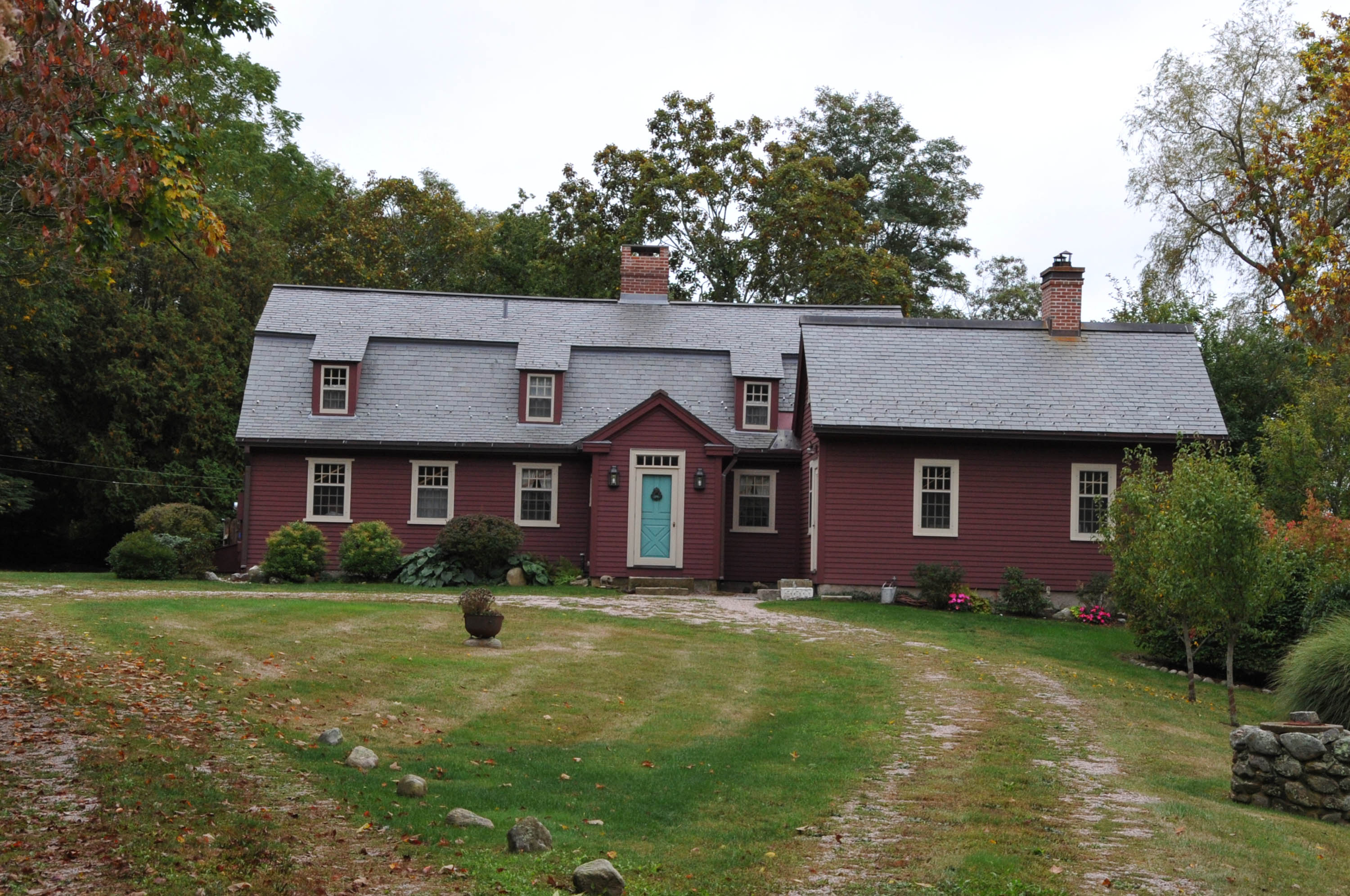

- Location within Connecticut Location within the United States
- Location: Brook Street, Groton, Connecticut
- Coordinates: 41°19′49″N 72°0′12″W
- Area: 5.4 acres (2.2 ha)
- Built: 1713
- Architectural style: Colonial
- NRHP reference No.: 78002874
- Added to NRHP: December 22, 1978

The Edward Yeomans House is a historic house on the waterfront of Palmer Cove on Brook Street in the Noank section of Groton, Connecticut. With its construction dating to 1713, it is believed to be Noank's oldest surviving structure, built by one of its early settlers. The house was listed on the National Register of Historic Places on December 22, 1978.

== Description and history ==
The Edward Yeomans House is located in a rural setting west of the village center of Noank, southwest of a ninety-degree bend in Brook Street on more than 5 acres (2.0 ha) overlooking Palmer Cove. It is a 1 1/2-story wood-frame structure, with a gambrel roof and central chimney. The exterior is finished in a combination of wooden clapboards and shingles, reflective of its evolutionary growth. The interior follows a typical central chimney plan, with parlors on either side of the chimney, and the kitchen behind, with small chambers in the rear corners.

The area that is now Noank was first laid out in 1712, when Groton town officials did so to facilitate further growth in the town. The following year, Edward Yeomans built a five-bay center-chimney structure with gable roof, on land whose ownership was contested by the local Pequot people. Yeomans left the land a few years later, due in part to what he perceived as encroachment by the Pequots on his land. Before 1760, a sixth bay was added, and the roof replaced by the gambrel roof. In the early 19th century, a shed-roof kitchen addition was added, and the main entrance relocated from the south to the north side of the house. The house is believed to be the oldest in Noank.

== See also ==
- National Register of Historic Places listings in New London County, Connecticut
