= Jesse Hahn =

American baseball player (born 1989)

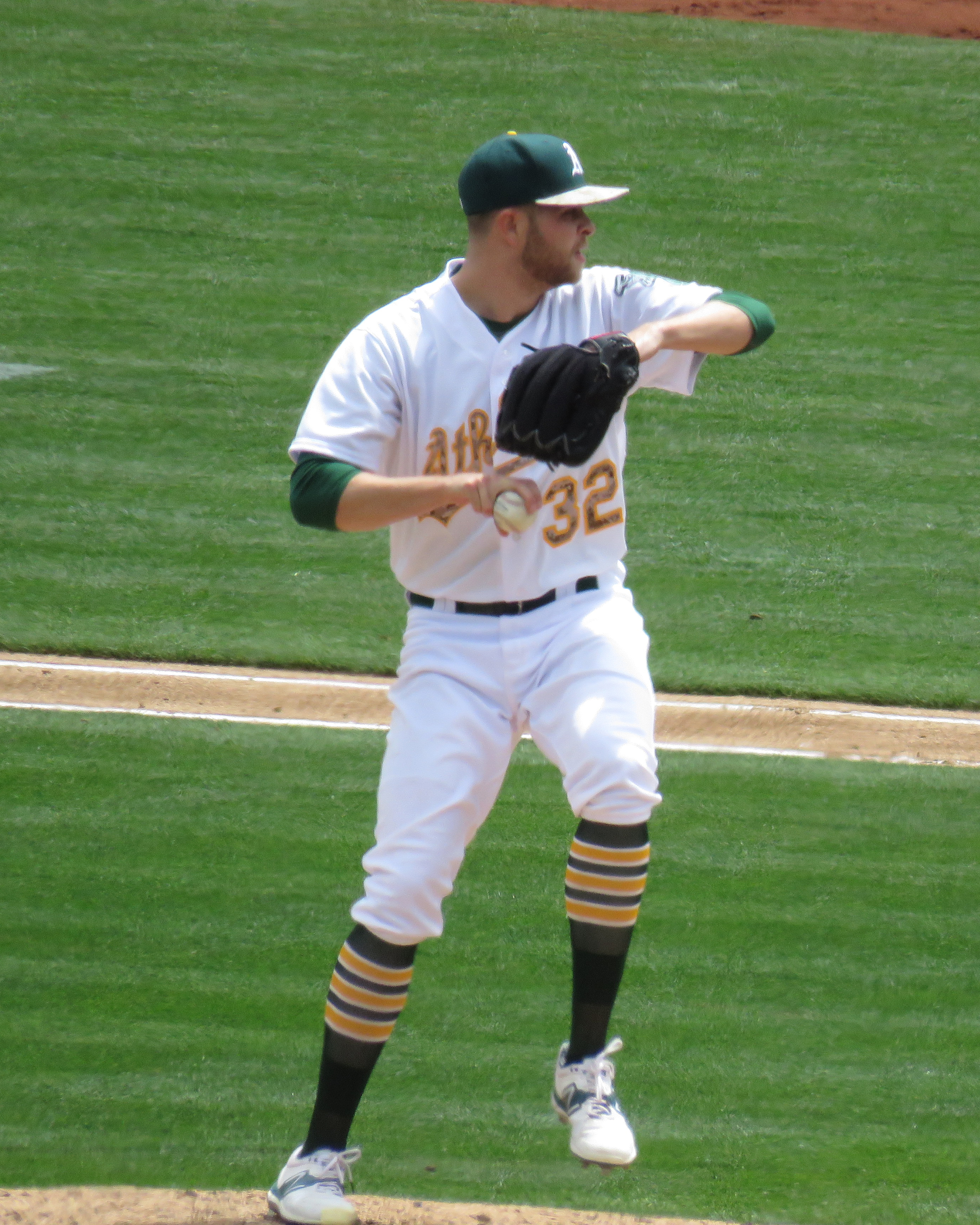
- Hahn with the Oakland Athletics in 2015

High Point Rockers – No. 22
- Pitcher
- Born: July 30, 1989 (age 37); Norwich, Connecticut, U.S.
- Bats: Right Throws: Right

MLB debut
- June 3, 2014, for the San Diego Padres

MLB statistics (through 2025 season)
- Win–loss record: 19–22
- Earned run average: 4.24
- Strikeouts: 244
- Stats at Baseball Reference

Teams
- San Diego Padres (2014); Oakland Athletics (2015–2017); Kansas City Royals (2019–2021); Seattle Mariners (2025)

Jesse Allen Hahn (born July 30, 1989) is an American professional baseball pitcher for the High Point Rockers of the Atlantic League of Professional Baseball. He has previously played in Major League Baseball (MLB) for the San Diego Padres, Oakland Athletics, Kansas City Royals, and Seattle Mariners. The Tampa Bay Rays selected Hahn in the sixth round of the 2010 MLB draft.

== Career ==
=== Amateur career ===
Hahn attended Fitch Senior High School in Groton, Connecticut. He pitched for the school's baseball team as a teammate of Matt Harvey. Hahn then attended Virginia Tech, and played college baseball for the Virginia Tech Hokies. In 2009, he played collegiate summer baseball with the Chatham Anglers of the Cape Cod Baseball League. He injured the elbow of his throwing arm in 2010, and underwent Tommy John surgery.

=== Tampa Bay Rays ===
The Tampa Bay Rays selected Hahn in the sixth round of the 2010 Major League Baseball draft. He signed with the Rays, for a $525,000 signing bonus. He did not make his professional debut until 2012 due to his recovery from Tommy John surgery. He was added to the Rays 40-man roster on November 20, 2013.

=== San Diego Padres ===
On January 22, 2014, the Rays traded Hahn and Alex Torres to the San Diego Padres in exchange for Logan Forsythe, Brad Boxberger, Matt Lollis, Matt Andriese, and Maxx Tissenbaum. Hahn was brought up from the Double-A San Antonio Missions, and made his major league debut with the Padres on June 3, 2014. He was optioned back to San Antonio the next day. He was called back up and ended the season with a 7-4 record with a 3.07 ERA in 12 starts.

=== Oakland Athletics ===
On December 18, 2014, the Padres traded Hahn and R. J. Alvarez to the Oakland Athletics for Derek Norris and Seth Streich. In 2015 he was 6-6 with a 3.35 ERA, and led the major leagues in runners reaching base due to errors, with 14. In his 3 seasons with the A's, Hahn battled numerous injuries and inconsistency, appearing in only 38 starts.

=== Kansas City Royals ===
On January 29, 2018, the Athletics traded Hahn and Heath Fillmyer to the Kansas City Royals for Brandon Moss and Ryan Buchter. After experiencing some discomfort in his UCL during the beginning of spring training, the Royals placed Hahn on the 60 day disabled list to begin the season. He ended up missing the entire 2018 season. The following season, Hahn spent the majority of the season rehabbing and in the minors, appearing in only 6 games for Kansas City. Hahn was non-tendered on December 2, 2019, and became a free agent. Hahn re-signed with the Royals on a one-year contract on December 13, 2019.

With the 2020 Kansas City Royals, Hahn appeared in 18 games, compiling a 1-0 record with a stellar 0.52 ERA and 19 strikeouts in 17.1 innings pitched.

On May 22, 2021, Hahn was placed on the 60-day injured list with a right shoulder impingement. He became a free agent after the 2021 season.

=== Los Angeles Dodgers ===
After not having pitched at any level since 2021 due to injury, Hahn signed a minor league contract with the Los Angeles Dodgers on January 17, 2024. He was assigned to the Triple–A Oklahoma City Baseball Club to start the season, and pitched 41 2/3 innings over 35 games, compiling a 4–1 record and 4.75 ERA with 45 strikeouts. Hahn was released by the Dodgers organization on August 29.

=== Seattle Mariners ===
On September 4, 2024, Hahn signed a minor league contract with the Seattle Mariners. In 8 games for the Triple–A Tacoma Rainiers, he posted a 3.12 ERA with 10 strikeouts across 8 2/3 innings pitched. Hahn elected free agency following the season on November 4.

On November 18, 2024, Hahn re-signed with the Mariners on a new minor league contract. He was released prior to the start of the season on March 23, 2025. Hahn re-signed with the Mariners organization on a new minor league contract on March 27. On April 5, the Mariners called up Hahn to their active roster after optioning Tayler Saucedo to Tacoma. After two scoreless appearances for Seattle, he was designated for assignment on April 9. Hahn cleared waivers and was sent outright to Tacoma on April 12. However, he rejected the assignment and elected free agency the following day. On April 15, Hahn re-signed with the Mariners on a minor league contract. On May 21, the Mariners selected Hahn's contract, adding him back to their active roster. He allowed three runs in one inning against the Houston Astros, and was designated for assignment again on May 23. Hahn cleared waivers and elected free agency on May 26. He again re-signed with Seattle on a minor league contract on June 3. Hahn elected free agency following the season on November 6.

=== Toronto Blue Jays ===
On February 14, 2026, Hahn signed a minor league contract with the Toronto Blue Jays. He made 18 appearances for the Triple-A Buffalo Bisons, compiling a 1-1 record and 6.65 ERA with 23 strikeouts and one save across 21 2/3 innings pitched. Hahn was released by the Blue Jays organization on June 9.

=== High Point Rockers ===
On July 24, 2026, Hahn signed with the High Point Rockers of the Atlantic League of Professional Baseball.

== Personal life ==
Hahn's older sister, Melissa, has cerebral palsy.
