= The Deluxtone Rockets =

American band

- Origin: Muskegon, Michigan, United States
- Genres: Rockabilly; swing; punk rock
- Years active: 1996–2001; 2008–present
- Label: Tooth & Nail

The Deluxtone Rockets is an American band from Muskegon, Michigan. It began as a punk band, but by the time of signing to Tooth & Nail Records it had evolved into a swing revival outfit.

Their first album, which was self-titled, was produced by Gene Eugene and Dennis Danell of Social Distortion. They wrote their own songs, and their musical style and lyrics were often compared to the W's, but John Brown's lead vocals were likened to the Mighty Mighty Bosstones' Dicky Barrett or the Reverend Horton Heat.

For their second album, Green Room Blues, the group dropped the horn section entirely and shifted to a rockabilly sound. The album's title reflects the fact that both Eugene and Danell died in early 2000 during production of the album. Though Danell had not been involved in the production, Eugene had been, and was replaced by Chris Colbert. The album has a darker mood than their debut effort, though its lyrics still reflect the faith of John Brown. The album also contained a cover of the Cure's "Lovesong".

2000 was generally reported as a bad year for the band; they were unable to play shows regularly because in addition to recording difficulties, their drummer left, after wanting to move to a different style musically. They were able to get Rodney from the Calicoes to fill in occasionally, and thus played at Cornerstone and other festivals. Also, one night their van caught fire and was totaled, though they still managed to play that night.

== Discography ==
- 1999 The Deluxtone Rockets
- 1999 Happy Christmas Volume 2 (Compilation, BEC)
- 2001 Green Room Blues
- 2009 New Material Demo

== Band members ==
=== 1999 ===
- John Brown - Lead Vocals, Guitar
- Jimmy Van Boxel - Upright Bass, BGV's
- Jacob Dykema - Tenor Sax, Vocals
- Richard Mittwede - Trombone, BGV's
- Jason Sorn - Drums
- Tim Harvell - Trumpet, BGV's

=== 2001 ===
- John Brown
- Jimmy Van Boxel
- Lonnie Pease - guitar
- Jason Feltman

=== 2008 ===
- John Brown - Lead Vocals, Guitar
- Jason Sorn - Drums
- Harley Obzut - Bass
- Dusty Bottoms - Guitar
