= Jabez Smith House =

Historic house in Connecticut

- U.S. National Register of Historic Places
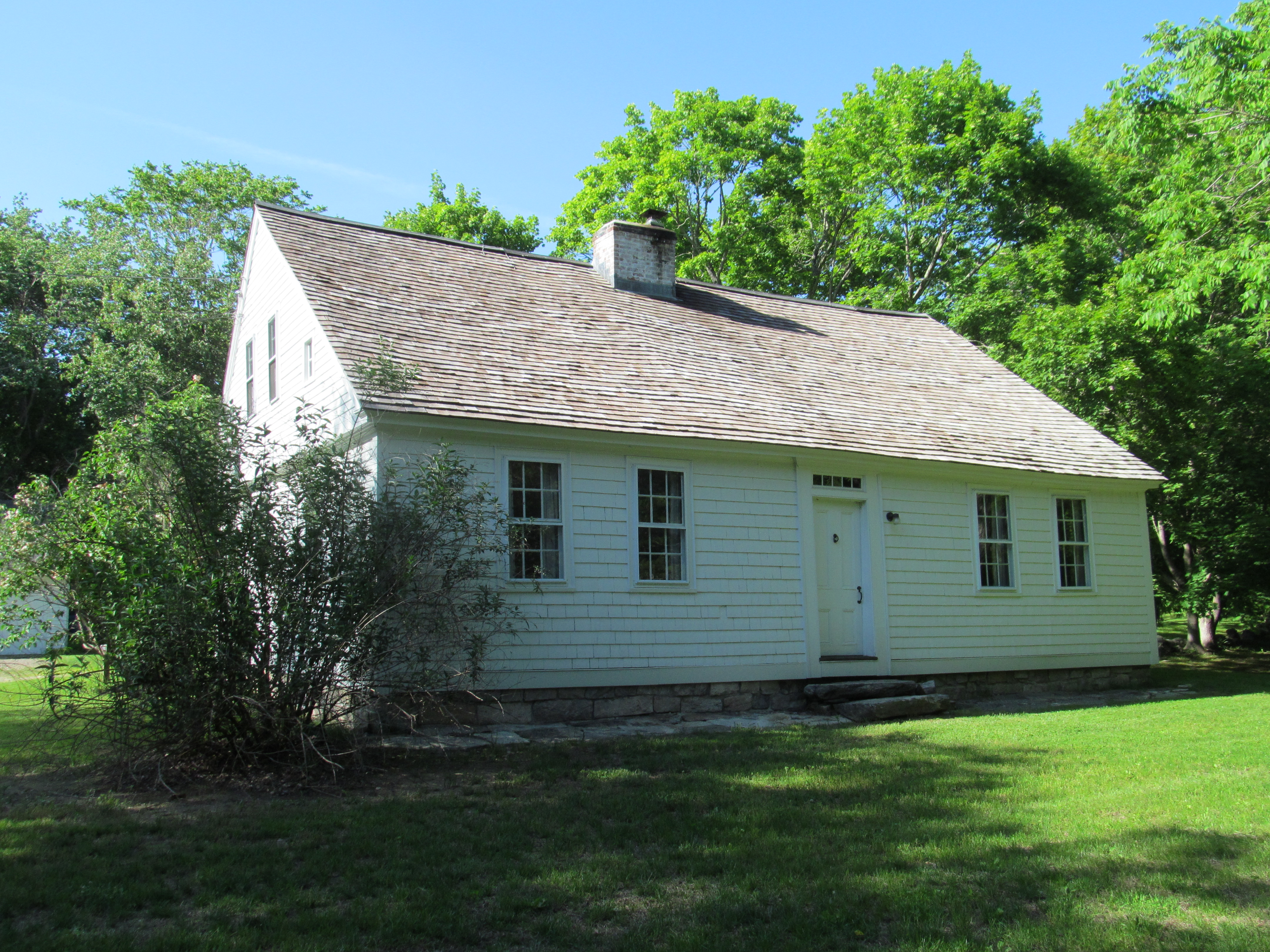
- Jabez Smith House photographed in 2014

- Location within Connecticut Location within the United States
- Location: 259 North Road, Groton, Connecticut
- Coordinates: 41°21′11″N 72°1′46″W
- Area: 2.4 acres (0.97 ha)
- Built: c. 1783
- NRHP reference No.: 81000615
- Added to NRHP: May 15, 1981

The Jabez Smith House is a historic house museum at 259 North Road in Groton, Connecticut, built about 1783. It is the only 18th-century farmhouse to survive in Groton's Poquonock Bridge area, which was once the town's principal agricultural area. It is owned by the town of Groton and open to the public on weekends from April through November. It features 18th and 19th-century antiques. The house was listed on the National Register of Historic Places on May 15, 1981.

== Description and history ==
The Jabez Smith House is located in a rural-suburban area east of downtown Groton, on the east side of North Road near its junction with Newtown Road. The house is a 1 1/2-story Cape style house, with a side gable roof, central chimney, and an exterior finished in a combination of wooden shingles and clapboards. It is five bays wide, with a center entrance topped by a four-light transom window. The interior follows a typical center chimney plan, and is simply finished, with original plaster and woodwork.

The house was built about 1783, presumably by Jabez Smith, the great-grandson of one of Groton's first proprietors, Reverend Nehemiah Smith. The house stands on a foundation built by Jabez's grandfather around 1663. It is the only 18th-century farmhouse to survive in Groton's Poquonock Bridge area, which was once the town's principal agricultural area. Other foundations dot the property, including that of a 19th-century barn, and another of an outhouse, on which a modern reproduction has been built. The house remained in the hands of Smith descendants until 1974, when it was given to the town.

== See also ==
- List of the oldest buildings in Connecticut
- National Register of Historic Places listings in New London County, Connecticut
