= Black Knight =

Literary stock character

A black knight is a literary stock character who masks his identity by not displaying heraldry. Black knights are usually portrayed as villains who use this anonymity for misdeeds. The character appears in Arthurian legend and has been adapted and adopted by various authors, in cinema and popular culture. The character is sometimes associated with death or darkness. They are often contrasted with the knight-errant (white knight).

In business, the term refers to a predatory person or firm making an unwelcome bid to take over another company.

The Black Knight or Black Knights are characters in:

== Comics ==
- The Black Knight (comics), a 1998 Scrooge McDuck story
- Black Knight (Marvel Comics), several Marvel Comics characters
- Black Knight (manga), a 2003 yaoi manga by Kai Tsurugi

== Film ==
- The Black Knight (film), a 1954 film starring Alan Ladd
- Black Knight (Monty Python), a character in the film Monty Python and the Holy Grail
- Black Knight, a projected animated film to be directed by Genndy Tartakovsky
- The Black Knight Ghost in Scooby-Doo 2: Monsters Unleashed

== Literature ==
- Richard the Lionheart's disguise in Ivanhoe, by Sir Walter Scott
- A black knight in The Book of the Duchess, by Geoffrey Chaucer
- A wraith in Die Jungfrau von Orleans (The Maid of Orleans), by Friedrich Schiller
- The Black Knight, two characters in the GrailQuest series of adventure gamebooks
- The Black Knight, a 1920 novel by Mrs. Alfred Sidgwick and Crosbie Garstin
- The Black Knight, a 1926 novel by Ethel M. Dell
- The Black Knight, a 1976 novel by Flora Kidd
- The Black Knights, a 1977 novel by Guy N. Smith
- The Black Knights, a 1983 novel by Charles Whiting

== Television ==
- Black Knight: The Man Who Guards Me, a 2017 South Korean TV series
- Black Knight (South Korean TV series), a 2023 South Korean TV series
- The villain in the premiere episode of Scooby-Doo, Where Are You!, entitled "What a Night for a Knight"
- The villain of in an episode of The Scooby-Doo Show, entitled "Scared a Lot in Camelot"
- Two heroes in the Japanese tokusatsu series Seijuu Sentai Gingaman

== Video games ==
- A major villain in Sonic and the Black Knight, a video game for the Wii
- Black Knight, a major antagonist in the video game Shovel Knight
- The Black Knight, one of the primary antagonists of Fire Emblem: Path of Radiance and Fire Emblem: Radiant Dawn
- A playable character in Shrek Super Slam
- A villain in Sly Cooper: Thieves in Time
- The Roaring Knight, the main antagonist in the video game Deltarune

== Other ==
- The title character of The Black Knight (Elgar), a symphony/cantata written by Edward Elgar in 1889–1893
- The antagonist in a pinball franchise, Black Knight, Black Knight 2000 and Black Knight: Sword of Rage

== See also ==
- Black Night (disambiguation)
- Dark Knight (disambiguation)
- White Knight (disambiguation)
