= Fitch High School =

Location
- 101 Groton Long Point Road; Groton, Connecticut 06340; United States; 41°20′24″N 72°00′47″W

Information
- Type: Public high school
- Motto: Achieve More, Believe More, Care More
- Established: 1928 (98 years ago)
- School district: Groton Public Schools
- CEEB code: 070435
- Principal: Matthew Z. Brown
- Teaching staff: 93.20 (FTE)
- Grades: 9-12
- Enrollment: 1,019 (2023-2024)
- Student to teacher ratio: 10.93
- Colors: Red and black
- Athletics conference: Eastern Connecticut Conference
- Mascot: Falcon
- Newspaper: The Scarlet Tanager
- Website: fhs.grotonschools.org

Robert E. Fitch High School is a public high school located in Groton, Connecticut.

== History ==
The original Fitch High School (now the former location of Fitch Middle School) was built in 1928 next to the Town Hall on Poquonock Road and was funded in part by the will of a local merchant, Charles Fitch, with the stipulation that it be named after his son - Robert E. Fitch. In the early 1950s, the district enrollment was larger than the school could handle, so the school district decided to split to a junior high and senior high system. In 1954, the school district built a new school, the current Robert E. Fitch Senior High School, in its current location at the top of Fort Hill Road. It was then renamed Robert E. Fitch Junior High School.

== Notable alumni and faculty ==
- Brian Anderson, Thrasher magazine's "Skater of the Year" 1999
- Amby Burfoot, runner
- Dave Campo, National Football League (NFL) head coach
- Jesse Hahn, Major League Baseball (MLB) player
- George Hall, Arena Football League linebacker
- Matt Harvey, 7th overall pick in 2010 MLB draft to New York Mets
- John J. Kelley, runner and cross country coach at the school
- Fran Mainella, National Park Service Director, 2001–2006
- Paul Menhart, former Major League Baseball pitcher
- Karl Procaccini, associate justice on the Minnesota Supreme Court.
- Kevin Wildes, broadcaster First Things First (talk show)
- Samantha Urbani, singer songwriter
- Dan Gaiewski, Connecticut State Representative
