= The Deluxtone Rockets (album) =

Studio album by The Deluxtone Rockets
- Released: April 27, 1999
- Genres: Swing; surf; rockabilly; jump blues
- Length: 39:36
- Label: Tooth & Nail Records
- Producer: Luis Garcia

The Deluxtone Rockets chronology
The Deluxtone Rockets (1999)	Green Room Blues (2000)

Professional ratings
Review scores
Source	Rating
The Phantom Tollbooth	not rated
Space Rock City	not rated
Popmatters.com	not rated
CCM Magazine	not rated
7ball	not rated

The Deluxtone Rockets is the debut album from Michigan band The Deluxtone Rockets. Musically the album has been described as swing music filtered through punk, sometimes achieving a middle ground between surf and 1950s rockabilly. Lyrically the album covers "familiar territory" – similar to that of Horton Heat but with a moralistic slant.

== Track listing ==
1. "Tijuana Jumping Bean" – 3:26
2. "Green-Eyed Cat" – 3:22
3. "Long Road Home" – 3:31
4. "Be Bop A Go Go" – 2:30
5. "You Get Burned" – 4:05
6. "Rev It Up" – 3:37
7. "Hi-Fi Daddy" – 4:10
8. "Johnny In The Mirror" – 4:15
9. "God's Cadillac" – 2:28
10. "Rumble With The Devil" – 3:58
11. "Kitten" – 4:15
