= Marine Science Magnet High School =

Marine Science Magnet High School of Southeastern Connecticut

Location
- 130 Shennecossett Road; Groton, Connecticut 06340; United States; 41°20′15″N 72°04′18″W

Information
- Type: Public high school
- Established: 2011 (15 years ago)
- School district: LEARN
- CEEB code: 070252
- Principal: Tara Amatrudo
- Grades: 9-12
- Enrollment: 272
- Colors: Red, white, and blue
- Mascot: Sharks
- Newspaper: Atlantis/Fish Tails
- Website: www.msmhs.com

Marine Science Magnet High School of Southeastern Connecticut is a magnet high school in Groton, Connecticut, in the United States. It opened on September 1, 2011.

In the academic year 2012–2013 there were 178 students enrolled in grades 9–11, of which 94 were male and 84 female. Approximately 93% were ethnically white, and 7% Hispanic.

In 2023 the school earned the National Blue Ribbon Award and was ranked #1 in Connecticut by U.S. News & World Report.
