= Groton, Connecticut =

Town in New London County, Connecticut

- Town
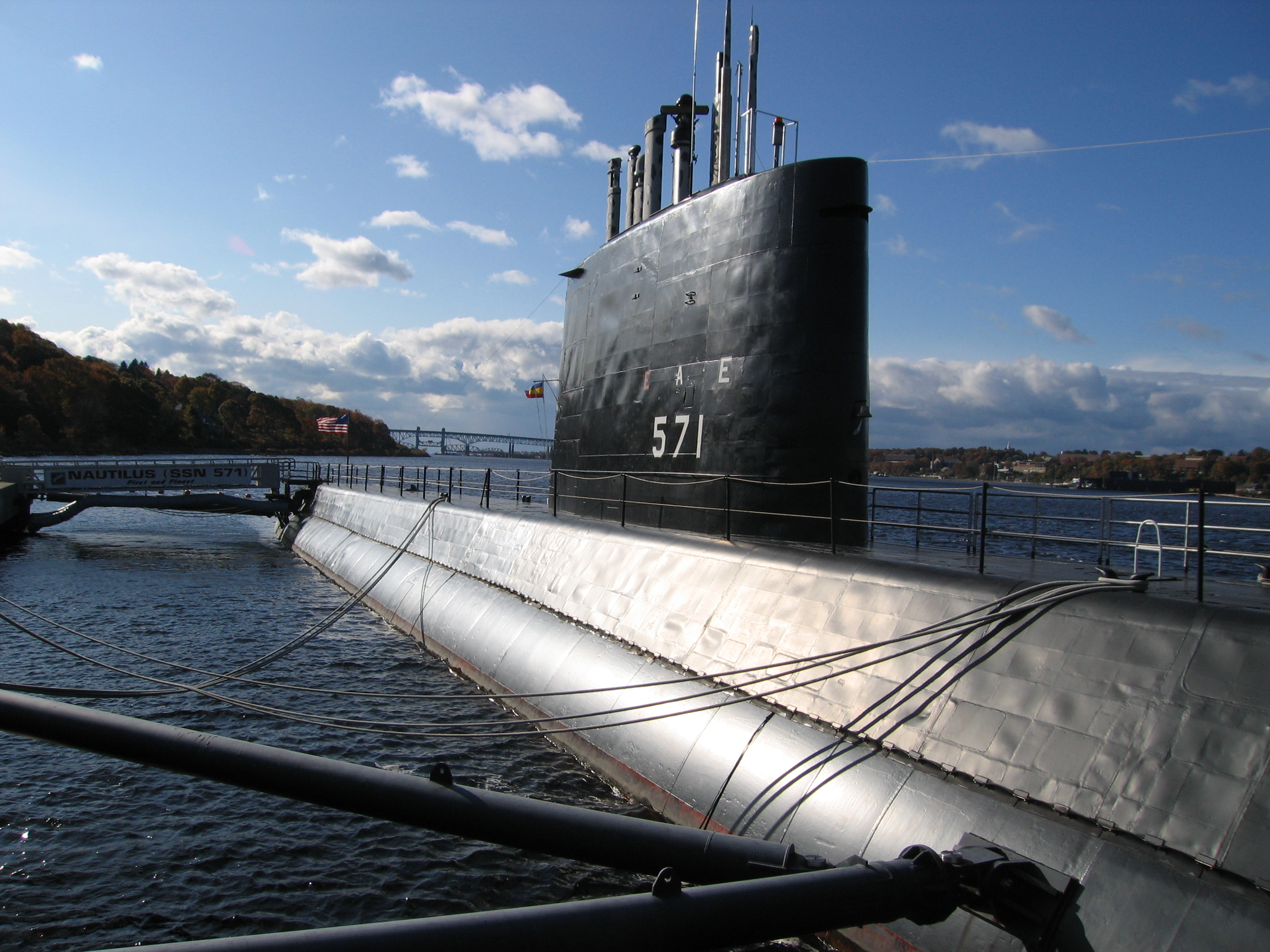
- USS Nautilus (SSN-571) moored in Groton at the Submarine Force Museum

- Flag Seal Logo
- Nickname: The Submarine Capital of the World
- Interactive map of Groton, Connecticut
- Coordinates: 41°20′54″N 72°4′39″W
- Country: United States
- U.S. state: Connecticut
- County: New London
- Region: Southeastern CT
- Incorporated: 1705

Government
  - Type: Council-manager
  - Mayor: Juliette Parker (D)
  - Town council: Joe Baril (D); Portia Bordelon (D); Kevin Fitzgerald (D); David Goode (D); Bruce Jones (D); David McBride (D); Roscoe Merritt (D); Adam Puccino Sr. (D)
  - Town Manager: John Burt
  - Town meeting moderator: Jean-Claude Ambroise (D)

Area
  - Total: 45.3 sq mi (117.3 km^{2})
  - Land: 31.0 sq mi (80.4 km^{2})
  - Water: 14.2 sq mi (36.9 km^{2})

Population (2020)
  - Total: 38,411
  - Density: 1,240/sq mi (478/km^{2})
- Time zone: UTC−5 (Eastern)
  - Summer (DST): UTC−4 (Eastern)
- ZIP Code: 06340
- Area codes: 860/959
- FIPS code: 09-34250
- GNIS feature ID: 0213437
- Website: www.groton-ct.gov

Groton (/ˈɡrɒtən/ GRAH-tən) is a town in New London County, Connecticut, located on the Thames River. It is the home of General Dynamics Electric Boat, which is the major contractor for submarine work for the United States Navy. The Naval Submarine Base New London is located in Groton, and the pharmaceutical company Pfizer is also a major employer. Avery Point in Groton is home to a regional campus of the University of Connecticut. The town is part of the Southeastern Connecticut Planning Region. The population was 38,411 at the 2020 census.

== History ==
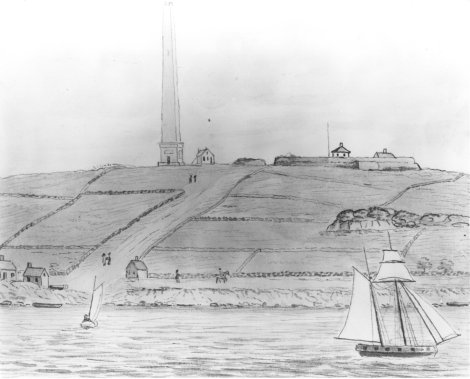
Groton Monument and Fort Griswold, a sketch by John Warner Barber for his Historical Collections of Connecticut (1836)

Groton was established in 1705 when it separated from New London. The town was named after Groton, Suffolk in England. A hundred years before it was established, the Niantic people settled in the area between the Thames River and Pawcatuck River, but they eventually settled in Westerly, Rhode Island. The newcomers to the land were the Pequots, an Algonquian people who moved into the Connecticut River Valley.

The summer of 1614 was the first time that the Pequots encountered white settlers. They started trading furs for the settlers' goods, such as steel knives, needles, and boots. In 1633, the Dutch bought land from them and opened a fur trading post. Meanwhile, the English bought land for settlement from the local tribes.

The land was poor for farming, but access to the region's waterways left room for commerce and trade, and Groton became a town of ocean-going settlers. Most of the community began to build ships, and soon traders made their way to Massachusetts Bay Colony and Plymouth Colony to trade for food, tools, weapons, and clothing. John Leeds was the earliest shipbuilder, coming as a sea captain from Kent, England. He built a 20-ton brigantine, a two-masted sailing ship with square-rigged sails on the foremast and fore-and-aft sails on the mainmast. Thomas Starr built a 67-ton square-sterned vessel, and Thomas Latham launched a 100-ton brig on the Groton bank with mast standing and fully rigged. The sturdy ships built in Groton engaged in highly profitable trade with the islands of the Caribbean.

=== American Revolution ===
The Battle of Groton Heights was fought on September 6, 1781, between American troops led by Colonel William Ledyard and British forces led by Benedict Arnold. At sunrise, a force of 1,700 British regulars landed at the mouth of the Thames River in New London and Groton.

Arnold led an 800-man detachment through New London, destroying stockpiles of goods and naval stores. His men set fire to a ship containing gunpowder which created an uncontrollable fire that destroyed most of New London. Meanwhile, a British force of 800 men moved toward Fort Griswold in Groton, which was garrisoned by 164 American troops. The British attacked and eventually entered the fort, overpowering the small American garrison inside. The British suffered 52 killed and 145 wounded, while American casualties amounted to 85 killed and 60 wounded. Colonel Ledyard surrendered his sword to Loyalist officer Major Stephen Bromfield, who immediately killed him with it. Jonathan Rathbun described the surrender this way:

The wretch who murdered him exclaimed, as he came near, "Who commands this fort?" Ledyard handsomely replied, "I did, but you do now," at the same moment handing him his sword, which the unfeeling villain buried in his breast! Oh, the hellish spite and madness of a man that will murder a reasonable and noble-hearted officer, in the act of submitting and surrendering!

— Jonathan A. Rathbun, "Rufus Avery's Narrative", The Battle of Groton Heights, A collection of narratives, official reports, records, etc. (1882), Charles Allyn

A memorial for the battle was erected in 1830 for the 85 American soldiers who were killed at the fort. The 135-foot-tall (41 m) monument has become the town's symbol and is now featured on the Groton town seal.

=== Early 19th century ===
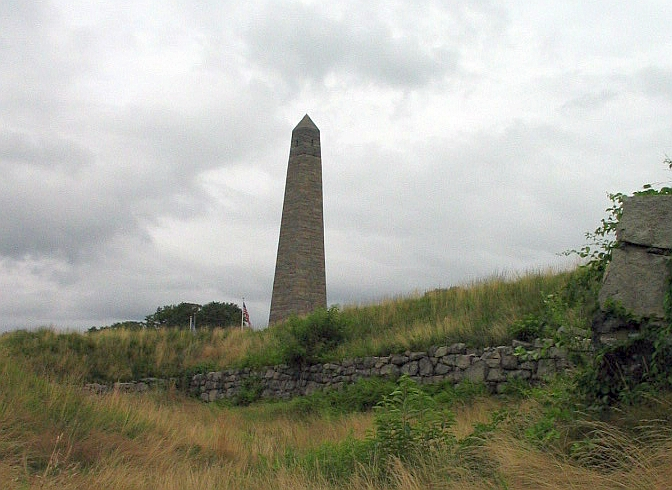
This monument, erected in 1830, commemorates the American troops massacred by the British following the surrender of Fort Griswold in the Battle of Groton Heights during the American Revolution.

Shortly after the Revolutionary War, Groton started to re-establish its commercial activities. Shipbuilders began to build again; Victory was launched in 1784, Success was launched in 1785, and five sloops were built in 1787, along with the 164-ton Nancy. Shipbuilders along the Mystic River were the busiest. These ships went on trips to Florida, and the resulting profits made Mystic the most thriving part of the town.

Between 1784 and 1800, 32 vessels were built in Groton. 28 more were built from 1800 to 1807, when business came to a sudden stop with the Embargo Act. In June 1812, the United States declared war on Great Britain. Most of the United States' small navy was landlocked in the Thames River. This frightened the people in Groton for fear that there would be a repeat of the Groton Heights massacre of 1781, and many residents fled inland for safety. Those that did not flee demanded protection and militia. These residents built a fort on a hill of rock that held one cannon and maintained constant guard. The fort was named Fort Rachel, after a woman that lived nearby. The British never attacked but created a blockade that ruined Groton's trade.

Some men from Mystic lured a British barge to Groton Long Point on August 12, 1814, the day after the British attacked Stonington, gaining themselves $2,600 in prize money; a minor event later known as "The Battle of Groton Long Point." The men in Mystic captured a sloop, the cargo of which they later sold for $6,000. Seventeen Mystic men also tried out a new weapon called the spar torpedo to rid themselves of the British blockade. They brought the torpedo from New York; it was 30 feet (9 m) long, 7 inches (18 cm) in diameter, and had a 12-foot (4 m) crossbar at one end. The men failed to sink HMS Ramillies. On their first attempt, the torpedo went into the water; on the second attempt, the explosive caught on Ramillies' cable and exploded. All the men made it safely to the shore while being fired at by the British ship and the American sentries at Eastern Point.

Groton received word that the war was over on February 21, 1815. The land-locked frigates left the Thames in April, leaving Groton to resume its marine pursuits.

After the War of 1812, whaling became a very important part of Groton's economy, but most of the expeditions were still for seal skins. Before 1820, sealers went to Antarctica, where their ships would drop them off. They would kill the seals and then prepare the skins for some weeks, until their ship returned for them. By 1830, whaling had become Mystic's main business. By 1846, Groton became one of the world's prime whaling ports. Whaling was difficult and dangerous, but boys would go out to sea to make their fortune, nonetheless, in the hope that some of them would eventually come to command a vessel.

In 1865, Ebenezer Morgan made one of the most profitable voyages. He sold his cargo for $150,000. Three years later, he raised the first American flag on Alaskan territory, and there he collected 45,000 seal skins. When he retired, it was said that his estate totaled up to $1 million.

William H. Allen, another son of Groton, spent 25 years commanding a whale ship. Old sailors said that "whales rose to the surface and waited to be harpooned." When he retired, he spent 12 years working as a selectman.

=== Late 19th century ===
In 1849, the discovery of gold in California created a demand for speed that resulted in the creation of the clipper ship, a fast sailing ship with multiple masts and a square rig. The most important vessel built at the Mystic River Shipyard was the clipper ship Andrew Jackson. In 1859, it sailed from New York City to San Francisco in a record time of 89 days and 4 hours. Both clippers and sailing packets were built in the shipyards of the Mystic River at that time. The Mystic shipyards started building ships with a greater cargo capacity after the Civil War.

Gideon Welles, Secretary of the Navy during the Civil War, wanted three experimental ironclad steamers to be built in private shipyards and used against the Confederacy's wooden fleet. A company in Groton was chosen to build a bomb-proof steamer designed by C.S. Bushnell of New Haven. 100 men were hired, and a big shed was built so that construction could continue rain or shine. The ship was ready for launching in 130 days. There were many skeptics who believed that the ship would sink or corrode once it hit the salt water, and there were very few who thought that it might float. Thousands came to watch Galena's launch on Valentine's Day 1862. Reporters commented that she floated like a duck. When it came time for Galena to enter battle, she was pierced 13 times. Thirteen of the crew members were killed and 11 were wounded from flying metal fragments. During the Civil War, 56 steamships were built for government service in shipyards on both sides of the Mystic River.

After the war, there were dozens of excess war steamships and, after 1870, shipbuilding moved up to Noank within the Groton town limits. One of the largest shipyards was Palmer Shipyard, established in Noank in 1827. A marine railway built in Groton in 1860 allowed them to pull vessels out of the water for repairs, which brought in a lot of business and money. The shipyard was running up to 1913 when one of the Palmer brothers died, but during World War I the shipyard was used again. Iron ships began to be demanded, and their construction attracted workers to Groton. Housing was beginning to run short, so Groton Realty had to hurry to build hotels and cottages. The ships which brought the workers in turn also brought more business to the Realty.

The Naval Submarine Base New London was founded in Groton in 1872 as the New London Navy Yard. Submarines were first based there in 1915, and in 1916 it was officially renamed a submarine base.

Groton used to include what is now the town of Ledyard, which separated from Groton in 1836. The original center of Groton is still known as Center Groton at the present-day intersection of Route 184 and Route 117, now in the north-central part of town, due to the departure of Ledyard to the north. Groton Center was the location of the town's first school, church, tavern, and stagecoach shop.

=== 20th century ===
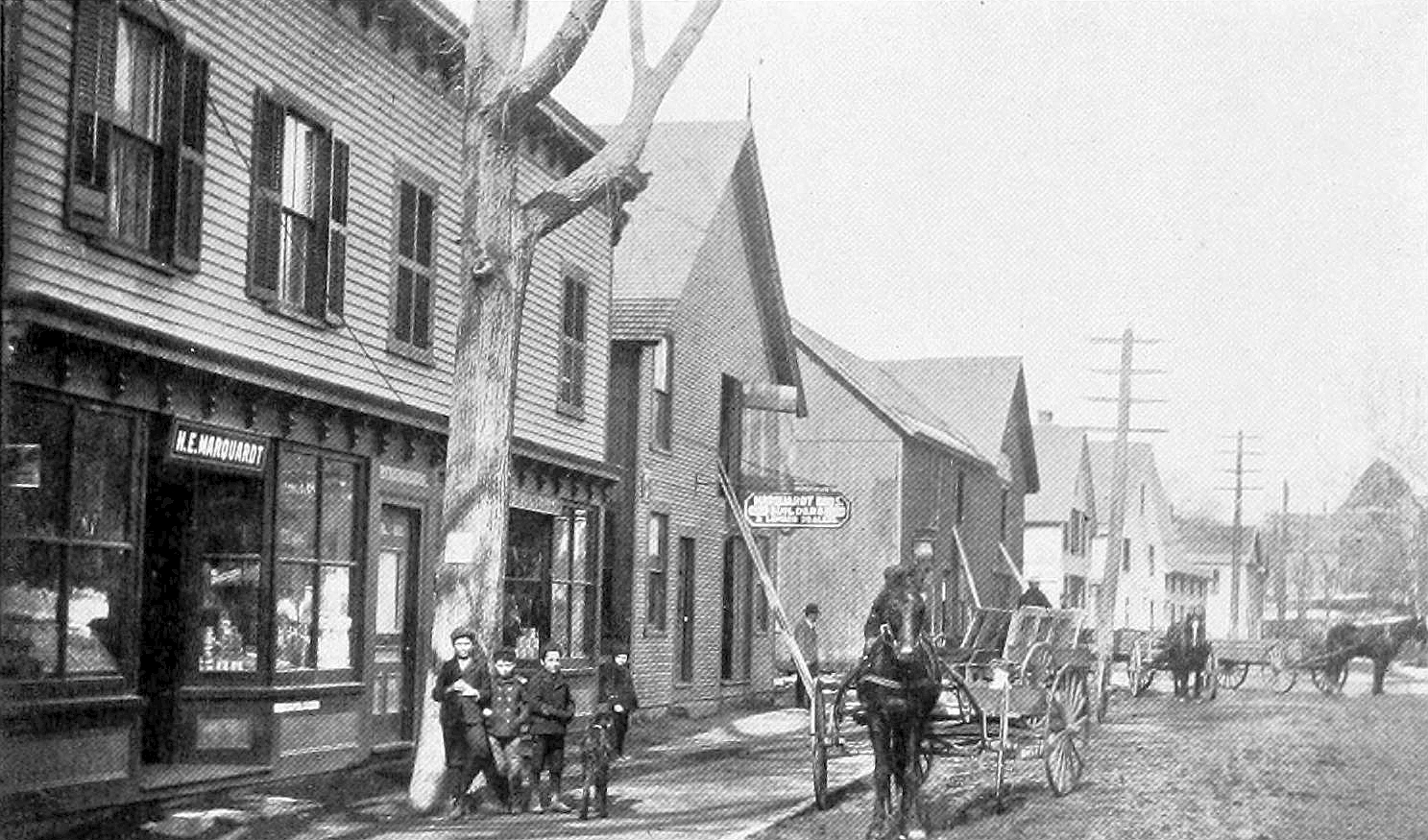
Thames Street (c. 1901)

In the 20th century, the shipbuilding industry moved from the Mystic River to the Thames River. Electric Boat is the town's largest employer. However, until 1931, submarines designed by Electric Boat were subcontracted to other shipyards, primarily Fore River Shipbuilding in Quincy, Massachusetts. Electric Boat commenced industrial operations in Groton with the establishment of the New London Ship and Engine Company (NELSECO) as a subsidiary in 1911. NELSECO was the primary engine manufacturer for Electric Boat-designed submarines from 1911 to 1925. In 1931, USS Cuttlefish was laid down as the first submarine built in Groton. During World War II, Electric Boat completed submarines every two weeks.

In 1954, Electric Boat launched USS Nautilus, the world's first nuclear-powered submarine. Presently, Nautilus is decommissioned and open for visitors, permanently berthed at the U.S. Navy Submarine Force Library and Museum. Groton is sometimes referred to as the "Submarine Capital of the World," due to the long-standing history of submarines in the town, and the fact that Groton has one of the largest submarine bases in the world. The National World War II Submarine Memorial East is located in Groton, including parts of USS Flasher.

The Groton and Stonington Street Railway was a trolley line that was created in 1904 to serve the Groton area. The trolley was dismantled and replaced by buses in 1928.

== Geography ==
According to the United States Census Bureau, the town has a total area of 45.3 square miles (117.3 km^{2}), of which 31.0 square miles (80.4 km^{2}) is land and 14.2 square miles (36.9 km^{2}), or 31.47%, is water.

=== Principal communities ===
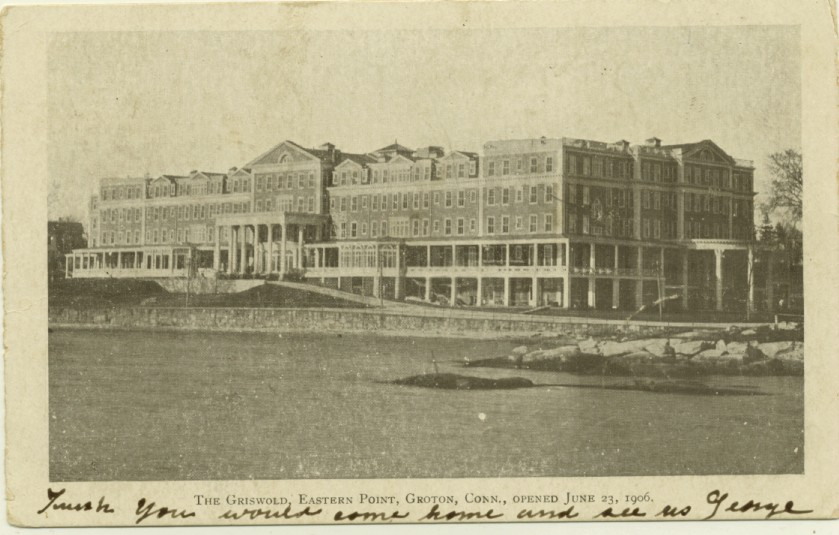
The Griswold at Eastern Point, 1906

- Burnett's Corner—historic district located along Packer Road south of Route 184
- Center Groton
- City of Groton—located along the Thames River
  - Groton Heights or Groton Bank—historic district in the northern part of the city area
- Groton Long Point
- Long Hill
- Mystic (06355)—a village within both the town of Stonington and the Town of Groton
- Noank
- Old Mystic
- Poquonnock Bridge
  - Fort Hill
- Submarine Base area (Census designation: "Conning Towers-Nautilus Park")

Other minor communities and geographic features are Bluff Point, Eastern Point, Esker Point, Jupiter Point, Mumford Cove, and West Pleasant Valley.

=== Climate ===
Groton has a humid continental climate (Dfa) that closely borders a humid subtropical climate (Dfa).

Climate data for New London (Groton) 1991–2020 normals, extremes 1957–2021
Month	Jan	Feb	Mar	Apr	May	Jun	Jul	Aug	Sep	Oct	Nov	Dec	Year
Record high °F (°C)	69 (21)	67 (19)	78 (26)	88 (31)	91 (33)	95 (35)	101 (38)	99 (37)	93 (34)	87 (31)	79 (26)	69 (21)	101 (38)
Mean maximum °F (°C)	56.6 (13.7)	55.8 (13.2)	65.5 (18.6)	73.6 (23.1)	81.9 (27.7)	88.0 (31.1)	91.6 (33.1)	88.7 (31.5)	84.7 (29.3)	76.5 (24.7)	67.4 (19.7)	60.0 (15.6)	92.6 (33.7)
Mean daily maximum °F (°C)	38.8 (3.8)	40.8 (4.9)	47.3 (8.5)	56.9 (13.8)	66.4 (19.1)	75.2 (24.0)	80.8 (27.1)	79.8 (26.6)	73.6 (23.1)	63.3 (17.4)	53.2 (11.8)	44.1 (6.7)	60.0 (15.6)
Daily mean °F (°C)	31.3 (−0.4)	32.9 (0.5)	39.5 (4.2)	48.9 (9.4)	58.1 (14.5)	67.3 (19.6)	73.4 (23.0)	72.5 (22.5)	65.8 (18.8)	55.2 (12.9)	45.5 (7.5)	36.8 (2.7)	52.3 (11.3)
Mean daily minimum °F (°C)	23.8 (−4.6)	24.9 (−3.9)	31.6 (−0.2)	40.9 (4.9)	49.9 (9.9)	59.3 (15.2)	65.9 (18.8)	65.1 (18.4)	58.0 (14.4)	47.1 (8.4)	37.9 (3.3)	29.5 (−1.4)	44.5 (6.9)
Mean minimum °F (°C)	4.1 (−15.5)	6.9 (−13.9)	14.7 (−9.6)	29.0 (−1.7)	38.1 (3.4)	46.8 (8.2)	56.0 (13.3)	54.2 (12.3)	43.6 (6.4)	32.2 (0.1)	26.6 (−3.0)	14.2 (−9.9)	1.5 (−16.9)
Record low °F (°C)	−14 (−26)	−12 (−24)	0 (−18)	14 (−10)	30 (−1)	38 (3)	47 (8)	41 (5)	29 (−2)	22 (−6)	8 (−13)	−10 (−23)	−14 (−26)
Average precipitation inches (mm)	3.91 (99)	3.42 (87)	4.92 (125)	4.40 (112)	3.67 (93)	3.93 (100)	3.42 (87)	4.19 (106)	4.29 (109)	4.42 (112)	3.75 (95)	4.59 (117)	48.91 (1,242)
Average snowfall inches (cm)	5.8 (15)	8.3 (21)	3.9 (9.9)	0.8 (2.0)	0.0 (0.0)	0.0 (0.0)	0.0 (0.0)	0.0 (0.0)	0.0 (0.0)	0.0 (0.0)	0.5 (1.3)	5.2 (13)	24.5 (62)
Average precipitation days (≥ 0.01 in)	11.4	9.7	11.5	11.6	11.9	9.5	9.7	9.3	10.2	10.4	10.0	12.4	127.6
Average snowy days (≥ 0.1 in)	3.1	2.7	1.7	0.3	0.0	0.0	0.0	0.0	0.0	0.0	0.2	1.9	9.9
Source: NOAA

== Demographics ==
Historical population
Census	Pop.	Note	%±
1800	4,302		—
1810	4,451		3.5%
1820	4,664		4.8%
1830	4,805		3.0%
1840	2,953		−38.5%
1850	3,833		29.8%
1860	4,450		16.1%
1870	5,124		15.1%
1880	5,128		0.1%
1890	5,539		8.0%
1900	5,962		7.6%
1910	6,495		8.9%
1920	9,227		42.1%
1930	10,722		16.2%
1940	10,910		1.8%
1950	21,896		100.7%
1960	29,937		36.7%
1970	38,244		27.7%
1980	41,062		7.4%
1990	45,144		9.9%
2000	39,907		−11.6%
2010	40,115		0.5%
2020	38,411		−4.2%
Population 1756–2000; 2010 population

As of the census of 2000, there were 39,907 people, 15,473 households, and 9,980 families residing in the town. The population density was 1,275.2 inhabitants per square mile (492.4/km^{2}). There were 16,817 housing units at an average density of 537.4 per square mile (207.5/km^{2}). The racial makeup of the town was 83.61% White, 6.95% Black or African American, 0.83% Native American, 3.33% Asian, 0.17% Pacific Islander, 1.66% from other races, and 3.45% from two or more races. Hispanic or Latino of any race were 5.01% of the population.

There were 15,473 households, out of which 33.4% had children under the age of 18 living with them, 50.5% were married couples living together, 10.5% had a female householder with no husband present, and 35.5% were non-families. 29.2% of all households were made up of individuals, and 9.5% had someone living alone who was 65 years of age or older. The average household size was 2.41 and the average family size was 2.99.

In the town, the age distribution of the population shows 24.8% under the age of 18, 11.8% from 18 to 24, 33.0% from 25 to 44, 18.3% from 45 to 64, and 12.1% who were 65 years of age or older. The median age was 32 years. For every 100 females, there were 104.7 males. For every 100 females age 18 and over, there were 105.5 males.

The median income for a household in the town was $46,154, and the median income for a family was $51,402. Males had a median income of $36,204 versus $30,255 for females. The per capita income for the town was $23,995. About 4.9% of families and 6.1% of the population were below the poverty line, including 8.0% of those under age 18 and 6.1% of those age 65 or over.

Voter registration and party enrollment as of October 31, 2023
Party	Active voters	Inactive voters	Total voters	Percentage
Democratic	7,378	653	8,031	33.38%
Republican	4,224	420	4,644	19.30%
Unaffiliated	9,890	1,083	10,973	45.61%
Minor parties	355	55	410	0.02%
Total	21,847	2,211	24,058	100%

== Economy ==
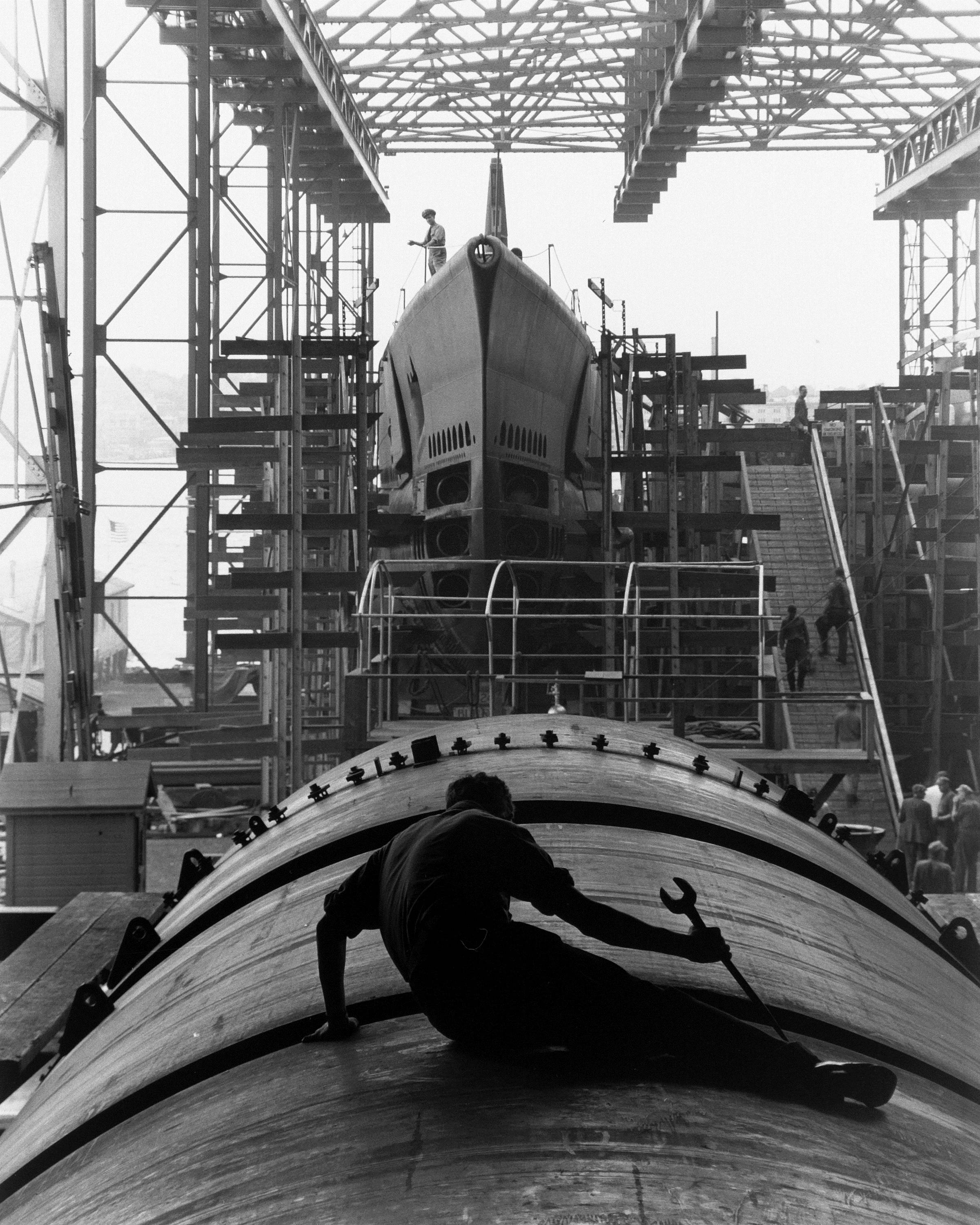
Fleet submarines under construction in World War II; photo by Charles Fenno Jacobs

There are two major companies in Groton: General Dynamics Electric Boat and Pfizer. The Electric Boat plant on the eastern shore of the Thames River employs 10,500 people in the community. Pfizer is one of the world's largest pharmaceutical companies, and the company maintains a 137-acre (0.55 km^{2}) research and development facility in Groton.

=== Top employers ===
According to the Town's 2022 Comprehensive Annual Financial Report, the top employers are:

#	Employer	# of Employees
1	Naval Submarine Base New London	10,750
2	General Dynamics Electric Boat	9,169
3	Pfizer	4,853
4	Town of Groton	967
5	Theater Aviation (2) Sustainment	460
6	City of Groton	219
7	Fairview Retirement Community	178
8	PCC Structurals	190
9	Chelsea Groton Bank	132
10	Mystic Marriott	126

== Arts and culture ==
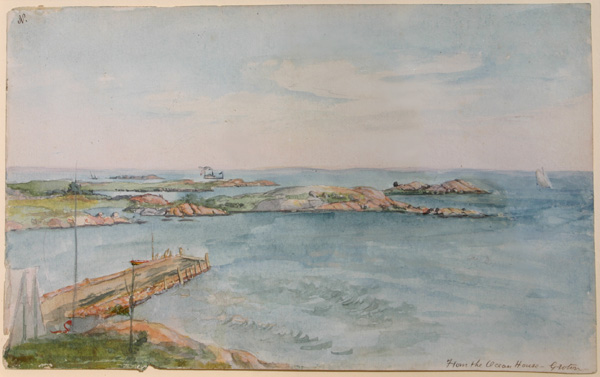
From the Ocean House, Groton (c. 1860) by Charles DeWolf Brownell

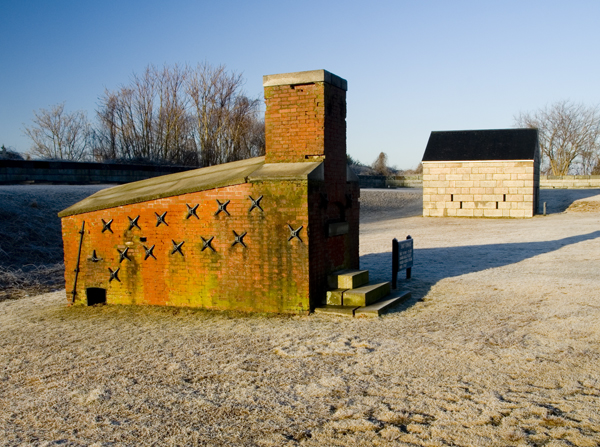
shot furnace at Fort Griswold

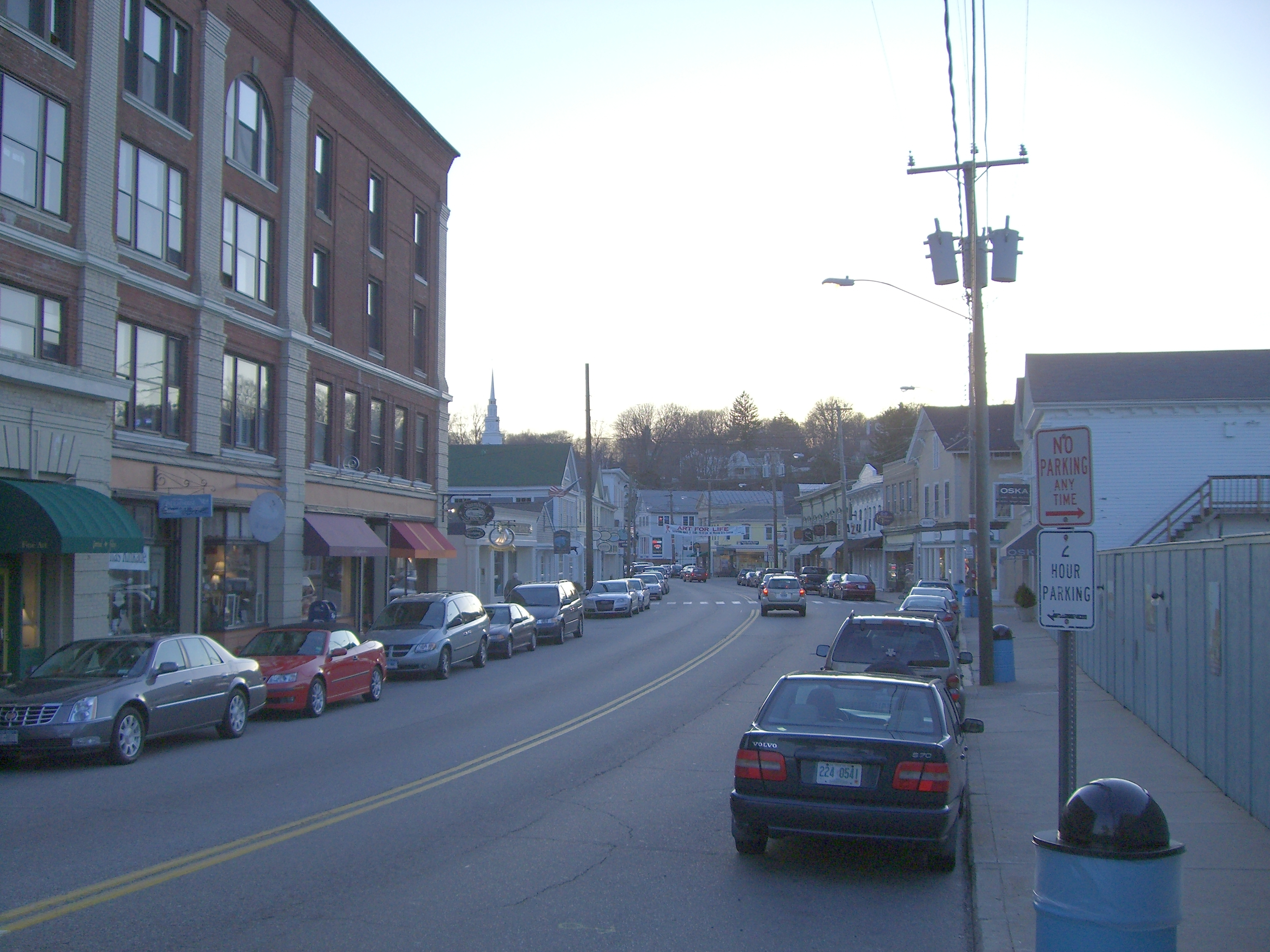
The Groton part of downtown Mystic

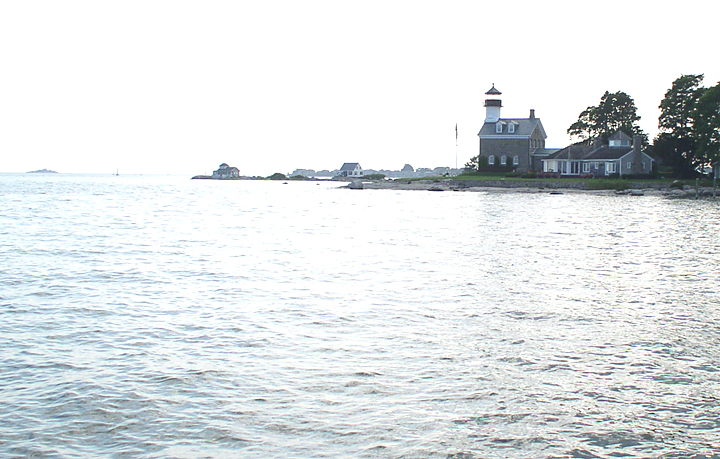
Morgan Point Light is located in Noank in southeastern Groton

=== Points of interest ===
- Branford House and Alexey von Schlippe Gallery of Art
- Fort Griswold
- Groton Monument, one of the oldest obelisks in the United States
- Gungywamp archaeological site
- New London Ledge Light
- Pequot Fort
- Jabez Smith House
- U.S. Navy Submarine Force Library and Museum, including USS Nautilus
- Edward Yeomans House
- Ebenezer Avery House

== Government ==
The Town of Groton has a Town Council consisting of 9 members, along with a Representative Town Meeting. The Town has a Town Council/Town Manager form of Government. The current mayor is Juliette Parker. The current Town Manager is John Burt.

== Education ==
=== Public schools ===
Public education is administered by Groton Public Schools.

==== Independent high schools ====
- Marine Science Magnet High School
- E.T. Grasso/Southeastern Technical High School, a technical school which serves Groton and surrounding communities

=== Higher education ===
- Avery Point campus of the University of Connecticut

== Infrastructure ==
=== Transportation ===
Local bus service is provided by Southeast Area Transit

Air travel is provided by Groton-New London Airport, a state-owned public-use airport in the southeast section of Groton. Since 2004, Groton-New London has not had scheduled passenger service, but has intermittently offered charter services with small local airlines.

== Notable people ==
- Robert G. Albion (1896–1983), influential maritime historian who died in Groton
- Brian Anderson (born 1976), professional skateboarder
- James Avery (1620–1700), captain of the New London militia company during King Philip's War
- Waightstill Avery (1741–1821), North Carolina politician, soldier in the American Revolutionary War, participant in a duel with Andrew Jackson
- James Cook Ayer (1818–1878), patent medicine businessman and industrialist
- Anna Warner Bailey (1758–1851), popular revolutionary hero
- Ambrose Burfoot (born 1946), marathoner who grew up in Groton
- Latham A. Burrows, former state senator
- Lorenzo Burrows, former US congressman
- Dave Campo, NFL coach and a graduate of Fitch Senior High School
- Nathan Daboll (1780–1863), politician, judge, textbook author, and almanac publisher
- Silas Deane (1737–1789), delegate to the Continental Congress and the United States' first foreign diplomat; born in Groton
- Jesse Hahn (born 1989), Oakland Athletics Pitcher, and a graduate of Fitch Senior High School
- George Hall, Arena Football League player, 2008, graduate of Fitch Senior High School
- Matt Harvey (born 1989), New York Mets Pitcher, graduate of Fitch Senior High School
- John J. Kelley (1930–2011), winner of the 1957 Boston Marathon, member of two U.S. Olympic marathon teams
- Husband E. Kimmel (1882–1968), U.S. Navy admiral and commander of the Pacific Fleet at the time of attack on Pearl Harbor, died in Groton
- John Ledyard (1751–1789), international explorer born in Groton
- William Ledyard (1738–1781), commander of Fort Griswold and killed in the attack on it
- Fran Mainella, National Park Service Director, 2001–2006, graduate of Fitch Senior High School
- Paul Menhart, former Toronto Blue Jays pitcher, graduate of Fitch Senior High School
- Lou Palazzi (1921–2007), NFL player and umpire born in Groton
- Thomas Rogers (1792–1856), builder of innovative locomotives, born in Groton
- Samuel Seabury (1729–1796), first American Episcopal bishop, born in Groton
- Elijah F. Smith, 8th mayor of Rochester, New York
- Tookoolito (1838–1876), famous Inuk guide to Arctic explorers, lived in Groton and is buried there in the Starr Burying Ground
- Cassin Young (1894–1942), U.S. Navy officer awarded the Medal of Honor
- James Y. Smith, 29th governor of Rhode Island
