= Matt Harvey =

American baseball player (born 1989)

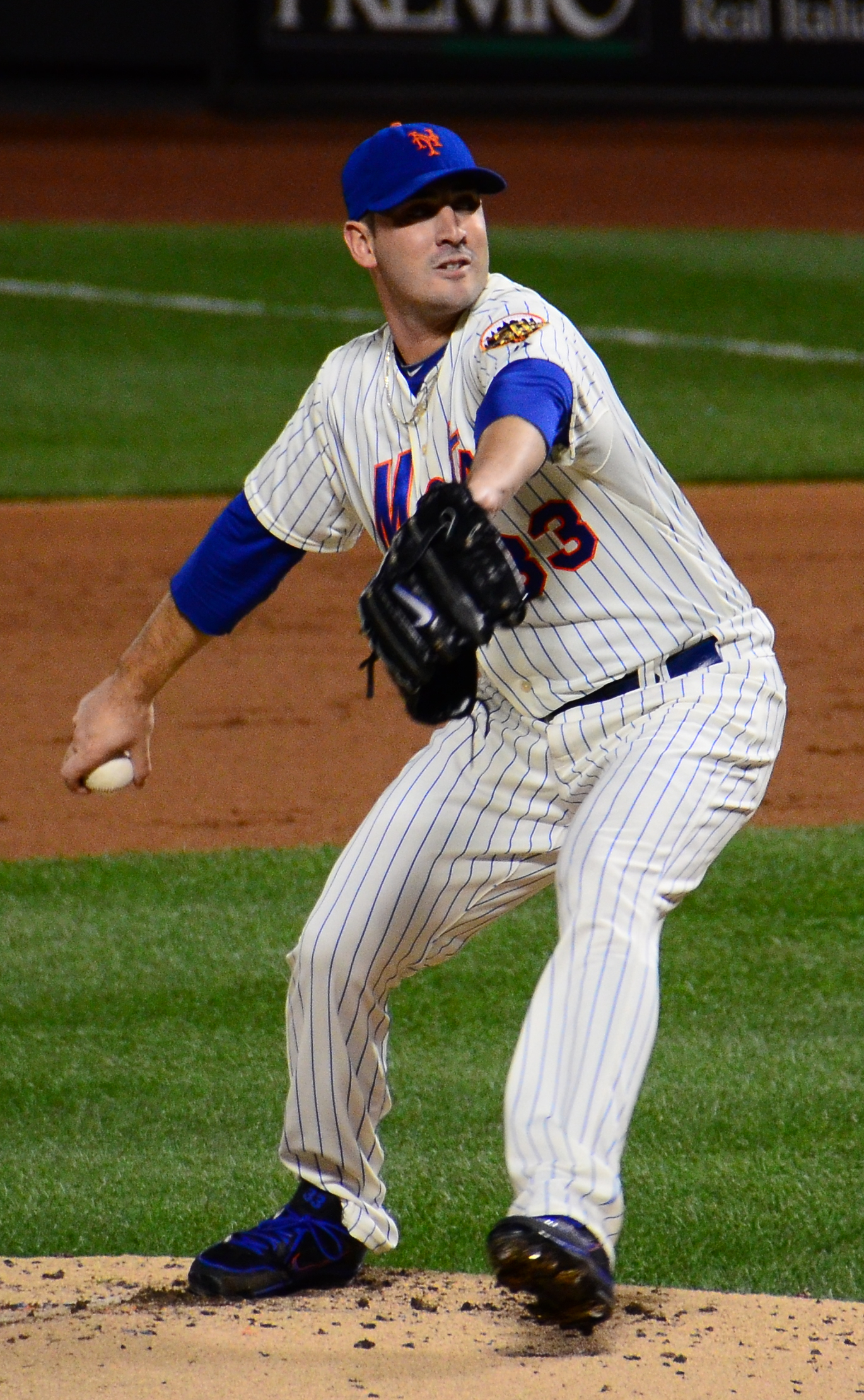
- Harvey with the New York Mets in 2013
- Pitcher
- Born: March 27, 1989 (age 37); New London, Connecticut, U.S.
- Batted: Right Threw: Right

MLB debut
- July 26, 2012, for the New York Mets

Last MLB appearance
- September 8, 2021, for the Baltimore Orioles

MLB statistics
- Win–loss record: 50–66
- Earned run average: 4.42
- Strikeouts: 867
- Stats at Baseball Reference

Teams
- New York Mets (2012–2013, 2015–2018); Cincinnati Reds (2018); Los Angeles Angels (2019); Kansas City Royals (2020); Baltimore Orioles (2021)

Career highlights and awards
- All-Star (2013); NL Comeback Player of the Year (2015)
Medals
Men's baseball
Representing United States
World Junior Baseball Championship
Silver medal – second place	2006 Sancti Spíritus	Team

Matthew Edward Harvey (born March 27, 1989), nicknamed "the Dark Knight", is an American former professional baseball pitcher who played nine seasons in Major League Baseball (MLB) for the New York Mets, Cincinnati Reds, Los Angeles Angels, Kansas City Royals, and Baltimore Orioles.

Harvey played baseball and basketball at Fitch Senior High School in Groton, Connecticut, and continued his baseball career at the University of North Carolina at Chapel Hill. The Mets selected Harvey in the 2010 MLB draft as the seventh overall pick. In his major league debut on July 26, 2012, against the Arizona Diamondbacks, Harvey set a new club record with 11 strikeouts while earning his first career victory.

Harvey had a breakout season in 2013, being selected to play in the MLB All-Star Game. Harvey then missed the entire 2014 season due to Tommy John surgery but returned in 2015 as his team won the National League pennant to advance to the World Series. His career, once promising during his first two seasons, was derailed by ineffectiveness after additional injuries, including thoracic outlet syndrome and a stress fracture in the scapula. After a disappointing start to the 2018 season, Harvey was traded to the Reds. He signed with the Angels in 2019, but was released midway through the season after posting a 3–5 record with a 7.09 earned run average. He signed with the Orioles for the 2021 season. He has played for the Italy national baseball team.

== Early life ==
Harvey was born in New London, Connecticut. He is the only son and youngest of three children of Ed and Jackie Harvey, both teachers. He is of Irish and Italian descent. Harvey was raised in Mystic, Connecticut, with his two older sisters, Jessica and Jocelyn. His father was a standout athlete at Groton, Connecticut's Fitch Senior High School and attended the University of Connecticut where he played both baseball (as a centerfielder) and football, even appearing in the 1972 College World Series. After UConn, he eventually returned to Groton to coach his former high school baseball team.

Harvey grew up as a New York Yankees fan, especially admiring Paul O'Neill and Derek Jeter, whom he has described as a childhood idol of his. At the beginning of every elementary school year, when asked to write about his life goals, Harvey would write that he wanted to play professional baseball.

At Fitch Senior High School, Harvey played both baseball (where he was coached by his dad) and basketball. He was teammates with future Major League pitcher Jesse Hahn on both teams. As a high school freshman, he was able on a few occasions to throw as fast as 90 miles per hour (140 km/h). Harvey would often pitch complete games in every outing, as he recalled later, “a typical game for me... I would walk 5 or 6 but strike out 16 each game, and only allow a few hits.” Harvey also played summer baseball for numerous travel teams across the country, including the South Florida Bandits, the Midland Redskins, and the East Coast Grays. As a high school senior, he was selected as a Rawlings First Team All-American and named to their Northeast All-Region First Team. He was grouped with Madison Bumgarner and Rick Porcello as one of the best pitchers in the 2007 MLB draft and a likely first round pick. Baseball America ranked him the best high school prospect in 2007. However, he fell to the Los Angeles Angels in the third round with the 118th overall pick, likely due to his lack of command. As the Angels offered only a $1 million signing bonus, Harvey took the advice of his advisors, Bill Caudill and Scott Boras, and opted to sign with the UNC Tar Heels instead.

== College career ==
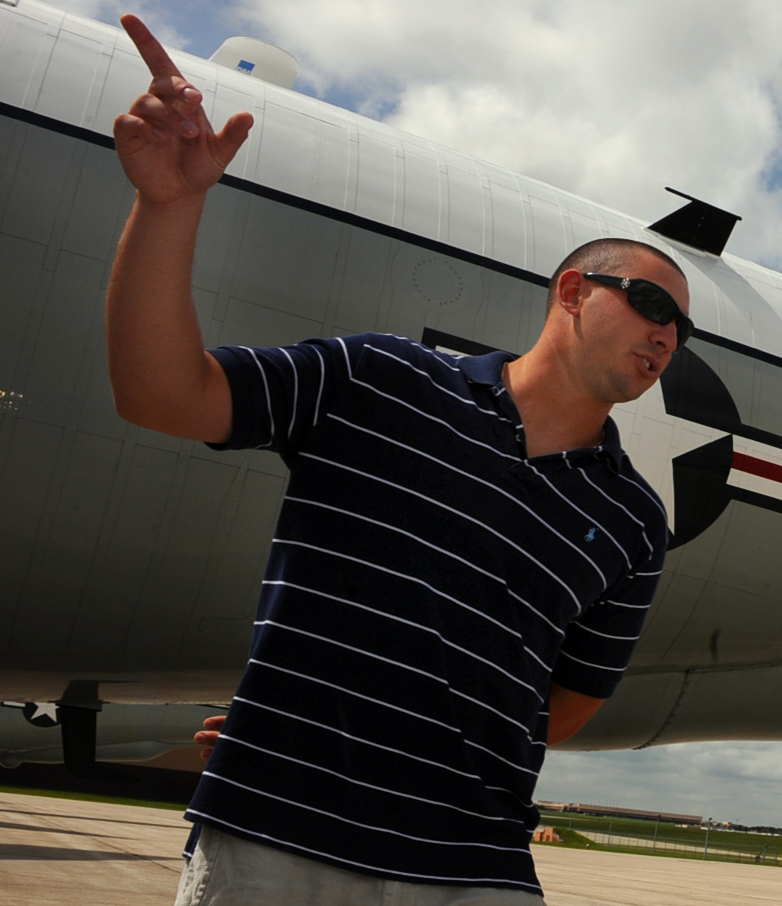
Harvey touring Offutt Air Force Base with the North Carolina Tar Heels in 2009

Harvey attended the University of North Carolina at Chapel Hill, where he majored in sports administration. During his collegiate career, Harvey went 22–7 with 3.73 earned run average (ERA) in 238 2/3 innings pitched. He ranks ninth all-time in UNC history in strikeouts (263) and 10th in wins (22).

Harvey spent the summers of 2008 and 2009 pitching for the Chatham Anglers of the Cape Cod Baseball League. Harvey was a key component of the Anglers’ 2008 bullpen, completing the season with a 0.83 ERA, the lowest on the team, pitching 21 2/3 innings and striking out 29 of 92 batters faced. Harvey returned to Chatham in 2009 after a difficult sophomore year on the mound. As Harvey explains, he had lost some of the mechanics and flexibility that had made him such a great pitcher throughout high school and the beginning of his college career. Although his 2009 summer was not as impressive as the previous one, his time on Cape Cod helped him return to the basics and set him on the road to becoming the seventh overall draft pick in the 2010 first year player draft. According to his pitching coach at UNC, Scott Forbes, Harvey returned from the 2009 Cape Cod League season with "a more professional approach."

== Professional career ==
Harvey was selected as the seventh overall pick by the New York Mets in the 2010 Major League Baseball First-Year Player Draft. Harvey was listed at 6' 4" and 210 lbs, batting and throwing right-handed.

=== Minor leagues ===
In 2011, Harvey's first professional season in the Mets minor-league system, he split time between the single-A St. Lucie Mets and the Double-A Binghamton Mets. With St. Lucie in the Florida State League (FSL), he went 8–2 with a 2.37 ERA and recorded 92 strikeouts in 76 innings. His performance garnered him two FSL Pitcher of the Week awards and he was selected as a FSL Mid-Season All-Star. Although selected to appear in the FSL All-Star game, Harvey did not pitch because he was promoted to Double-A Binghamton.

In the Eastern League with Binghamton, he went 5–3 with a 4.53 ERA and 64 strikeouts in 59.2 innings. Harvey also pitched in the 2011 All-Star Futures Game, recording a save for the winning U.S. team over the World team.

Harvey was ranked as the Mets organization's second best prospect in 2012 and the 34th overall best prospect by MLB.com. He was invited to spring training by the Mets that year but did not make the team. Instead, he was promoted to the club's Triple-A affiliate, the Buffalo Bisons of the International League (IL).

In the first half of his 2012 season at Triple-A, Harvey went 7–4 with a 3.39 ERA in 18 starts. That performance earned him International League Mid-Season All-Star honors. His strong pitching, plus injuries to major leaguers Mike Pelfrey and Dillon Gee, put him in contention for the fifth spot in the Mets rotation. Despite spending more time pitching at Triple-A than other top draft picks, 105 innings, recording a 3.34 ERA and striking out over a batter per inning through mid-July, the Mets front office (headed by general manager Sandy Alderson) did not want to promote Harvey until his consistency and control improved.

=== New York Mets ===
==== 2012 ====
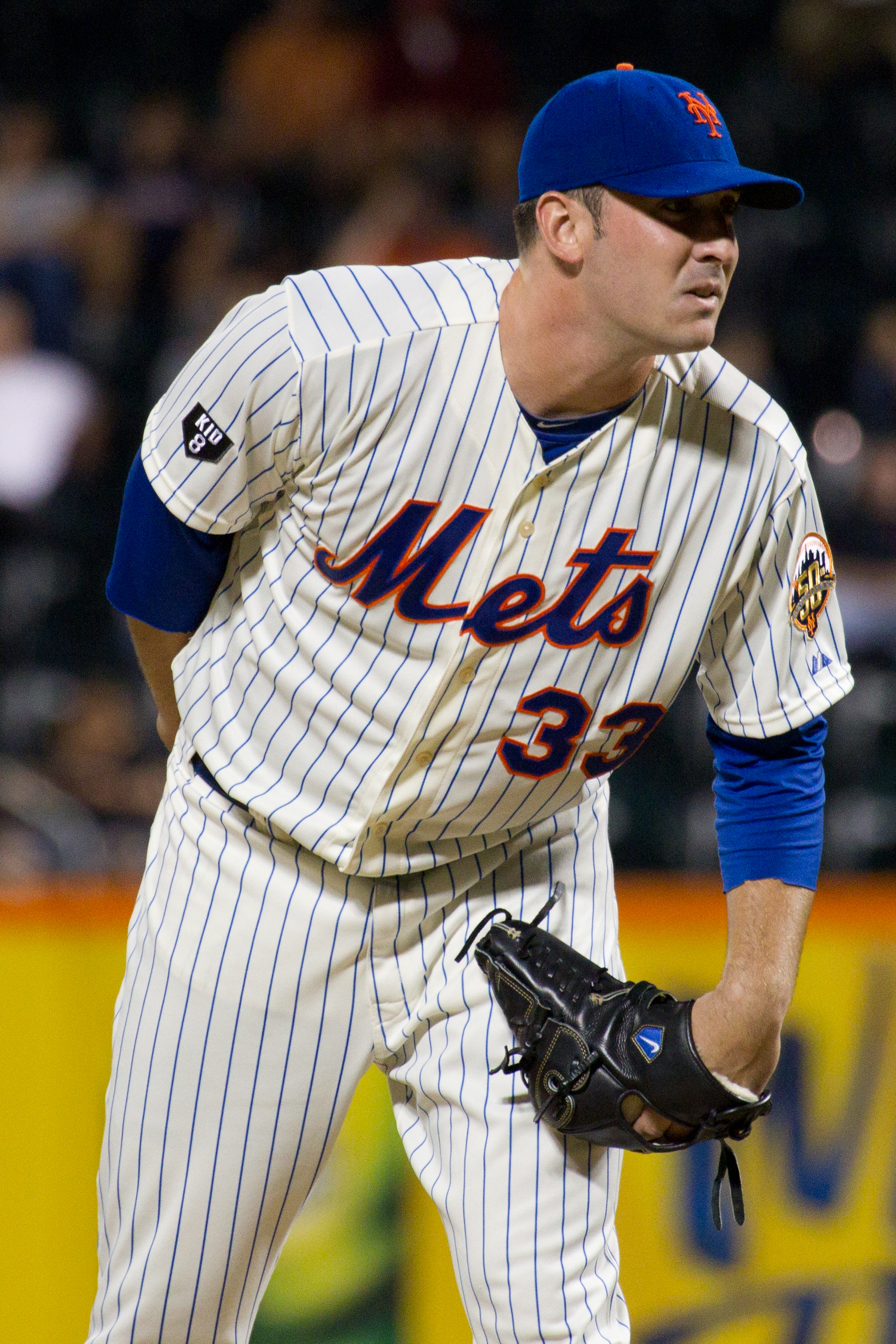
Harvey on the mound at Citi Field in 2012

After an injury to staff ace Johan Santana and replacements to the Mets' major-league rotation failed to turn in quality starts, general manager Sandy Alderson and Mets manager Terry Collins backtracked and decided to promote Harvey to the majors, ending his stay with the Bisons with a 7–5 record and 3.68 ERA. Harvey stayed in the rotation for the remainder of the season as the fifth starter.

In Harvey's debut, a July 26 start against the Arizona Diamondbacks at Chase Field in Phoenix, Arizona, he pitched 5 1/3 innings, giving up three hits and three walks while recording 11 strikeouts. Harvey recorded his first major-league strikeout against the first batter he faced, Gerardo Parra of the Diamondbacks. He then had his first major league hit, a two-out double off of Wade Miley in the top of the following inning. Harvey set a Mets franchise record for strikeouts in a pitching debut (11) and became the first player in modern baseball history (since 1900) to strike out 10 or more batters and get two hits in his major-league debut. After the game, Mets manager Terry Collins said:

"I haven't seen 98 out of a starting pitcher in quite some time. He's lived up to exactly what everybody's talked about."

In his second major-league start, Harvey pitched six innings against the San Francisco Giants, gave up two earned runs, three walks and struck out seven in his first loss. His 18 total strikeouts were a Mets record for a rookie over his first two games of his career. After three straight losses, Harvey was able to earn his second win against the Cincinnati Reds on August 16. In his next two starts, Harvey got a no-decision and a win against the Rockies and Phillies, respectively. Both were quality starts and he struck out 15 combined in the games. Over his first 15 plate appearances in seven starts, he posted impressive batting numbers, with a .462 average, two doubles and three runs batted in (RBIs).

Harvey then went on to lose his next two starts and record a no-decision in his last outing of the season on September 19. Despite more opportunities to pitch, Mets management ended his season due to an innings-pitched limit. He finished his inaugural season with a 3–5 record, a 2.73 ERA over 10 starts in which he pitched 59 1/3 innings and recorded 70 strikeouts. He surrendered 42 hits and 26 walks.

==== 2013 ====
Harvey continued to garner accolades for his arm strength and control in 2013. New York sports radio host Mike Francesa has compared Harvey to standouts like Justin Verlander, Andy Pettitte and Curt Schilling. After watching Harvey's first two starts of the 2013 season, during which he struck out 19 in 14 innings, former Mets manager Bobby Valentine said Harvey had the potential to be "the best Met pitcher to ever wear the uniform." His April performance garnered him Pitcher of the Month honors after he posted a 1.56 ERA with 46 strikeouts in 40.1 innings. Opposing batters hit .153 against him. Dwight Gooden gave him the nickname The Real Deal after he saw him pitch live.

On April 13, Harvey had a no-hit bid through 6 2/3 innings against the Minnesota Twins until Justin Morneau hit a solo home run in the bottom of the seventh inning. On May 7, while pitching with a severe nosebleed Harvey retired the first 20 Chicago White Sox batters he faced until Alex Ríos broke up the perfect game with an infield single. Harvey left the game after nine innings, having surrendered only the one hit, as the Mets won in 10 innings. He was subsequently featured on the cover of the May 20, 2013, issue of Sports Illustrated magazine, dubbed "The Dark Knight of Gotham." On June 18, Harvey took another no-hitter into the seventh inning, but was stymied by an infield single off the bat of the Atlanta Braves' Jason Heyward. Harvey notched a career-high 13 strikeouts in the game, giving up three hits over seven innings.

As the mid-season All-Star break approached, team management talked about limiting Harvey's innings to ensure his pitching health. Harvey had thrown 117 innings in 17 starts at the time, which put him on a season-long pace for 240–250 innings. Mets manager Terry Collins said Harvey would not be allowed to pitch more than 215–220 innings.

Harvey was the starting pitcher for the 2013 MLB All-Star Game, which took place at the Mets' home ballpark, Citi Field in which he pitched the first two innings. On August 7, Harvey pitched his first career complete game shutout, giving up four hits and striking out six in a 5–0 win over the Colorado Rockies. On August 26, Harvey was diagnosed with a partial tear of the ulnar collateral ligament in his right elbow and was placed on the disabled list. He had logged 178 1/3 innings at that point.

On September 17, Harvey said he would try rehab before opting for surgery. But the Mets announced on October 4 that Harvey would have Tommy John surgery to repair his right elbow. Because of the procedure, Harvey was expected to miss the entire 2014 season. Harvey finished the season 9–5 with a 2.27 ERA in 26 starts with 191 strikeouts in 178 1/3 innings. It was later announced that Harvey had finished tied for 4th in the Cy Young Award, losing to Los Angeles Dodgers pitcher Clayton Kershaw.

==== 2014 ====
On October 22, 2013, Harvey underwent successful Tommy John surgery to replace the partially torn ulnar collateral ligament in his right elbow. Dr. James Andrews performed the operation in Gulf Breeze, Florida. Exactly 4 months after his Tommy John surgery, Harvey was throwing a baseball for the first time since his injury occurred. He threw 20 times at a distance of 60 feet at the Mets spring training site Port St. Lucie, Florida, with the Mets goal being that he would be ready for the start of the 2015 season.

In March, Harvey dismissed the idea that he would not pitch until the start of the 2015 season by posting on Twitter that "2014 Harvey Day will happen". He also told reporters around the same time that he was looking to return around September 2014. But in June of that same year the Mets officially declared that Harvey would not be pitching until the beginning of the 2015 season. Harvey had been rehabbing at such an accelerated pace that they thought it would be better to take a more cautious approach. After talking with Mets doctors, general manager Sandy Alderson decided that slowing Harvey's path would be best. Another factor was that the Mets at the time were out of playoff contention, and him pitching in meaningless games was not worth the risk of being injured again.

In 2014, Harvey was elected the team's MLB Players Association representative.

Without Harvey for the 2014 season, the Mets finished with a record of 79–83 (second in the NL East), with the pitching staff boasting a combined ERA of 3.49, good for 6th in the National League.

==== 2015 ====
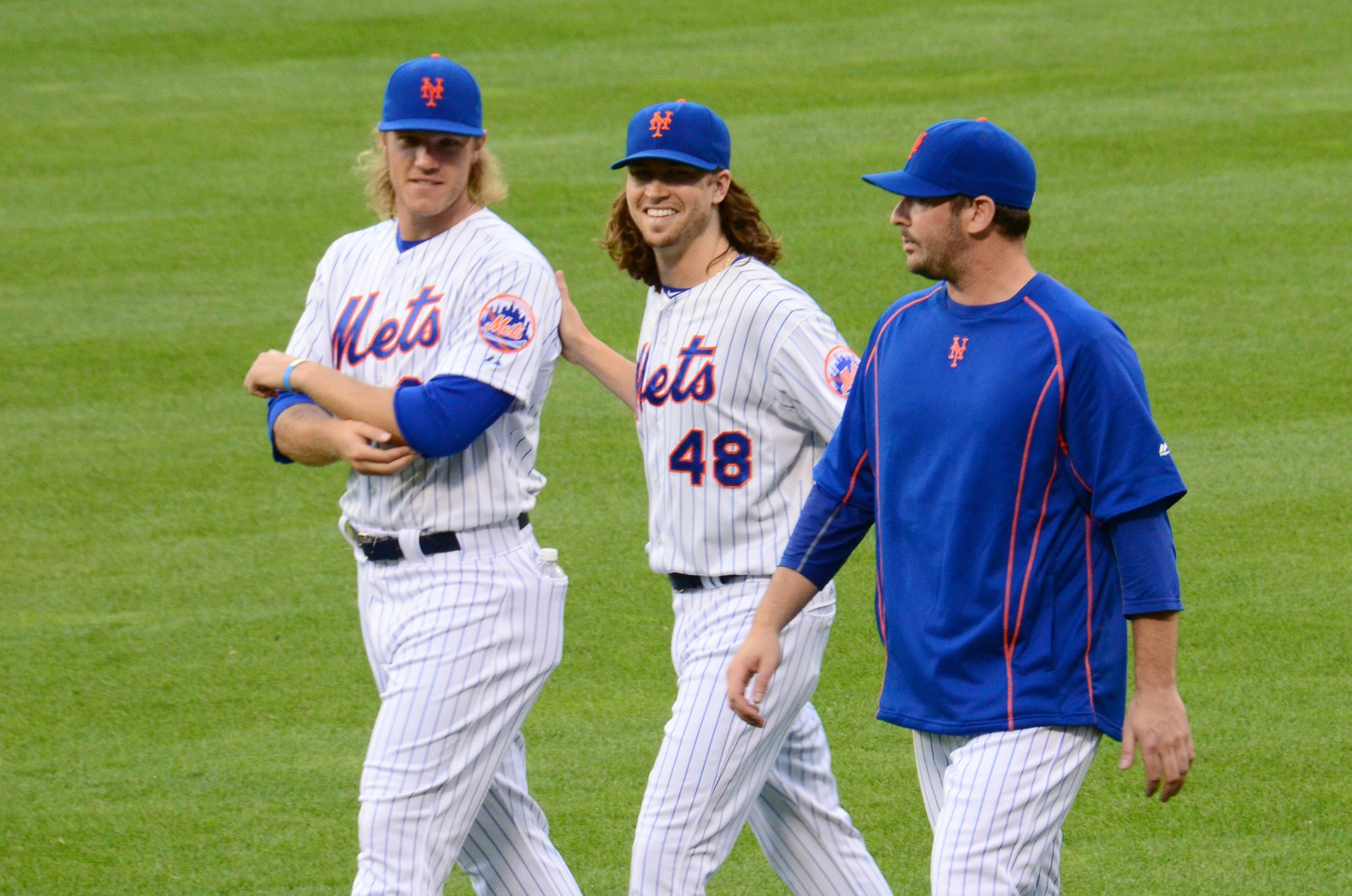
Harvey (right) with fellow Mets starting pitchers Noah Syndergaard (left) and Jacob deGrom (center)

On April 9, Harvey returned from surgery, and allowed no runs in six innings while striking out nine against the Washington Nationals. After the game, Nationals outfielder Bryce Harper said: "He's going to be a Cy Young one day and everybody knows that. He's one of the toughest at-bats I've ever had." On May 4, Hall of Fame pitcher and former Mets ace Pedro Martínez said that he believed that Harvey could have a better career than his own. He added, "I think he has more talent than I do."

On May 18, Harvey pitched 8 innings, giving up no runs against the St. Louis Cardinals while striking out 9. On May 23, Harvey had the worst start of his career, surrendering 7 runs to the Pittsburgh Pirates in four innings. Due to this poor outing, Harvey's ERA jumped from 1.98 to 2.91. On July 11, Harvey hit his first career home run against the Arizona Diamondbacks' Patrick Corbin. Harvey also pitched 7 innings, striking out 9, and got his 8th win on the season.

In September, Harvey's agent, Scott Boras, publicly expressed concern with the Mets' stated plans to allow Harvey to pitch around 190 innings in the regular season, and also pitch "a reasonable amount" in the postseason. Boras suggested that better medical advice, allegedly given by Dr. James Andrews, was to cap the innings at 180, and no postseason activity. Harvey initially appeared to agree with Boras, in contrast with his cultivated image of toughness and desire to compete and win at all costs, including having previously objected to efforts by the Mets to both proceed cautiously in his recovery with respect to the timetable for his return (in 2014 Harvey expressed a desire to come back from the injury early, while the Mets followed a conventional recovery timetable), and curtail his innings in 2015 by employing a six-man rotation. After backlash against Harvey's initial comments from Mets fans and the media, Harvey wrote in The Players' Tribune that the innings limit only applied to the regular season and that he would pitch in the playoffs.

On October 12, 2015, Harvey pitched against the Los Angeles Dodgers in Game 3 of the NLDS. Though he struggled a bit, he was still able to earn the win, becoming the first pitcher to win a postseason game at Citi Field. He gave up 3 runs (2 earned), 7 hits and 2 walks; he also struck out 7 in the Mets' 13–7 victory.

Harvey pitched well in Game 1 of the National League Championship Series against the Chicago Cubs, pitching 7 2/3 innings while allowing two runs and four hits on nine strikeouts. He started Game 1 of the 2015 World Series against the Kansas City Royals, giving up 3 earned runs through 6 innings in a no-decision. Kansas City won the game, 5–4 in 14 innings, to take the series lead.

In Game 5 of the World Series against the Royals, Harvey entered the mound with a 2–0 lead in the top of the ninth inning to try and finish the game despite having thrown 102 pitches. Manager Terry Collins had planned to take Harvey out for Jeurys Familia if he could get through seven innings with the lead. When he pitched a perfect eighth, Collins talked to Harvey about taking him out now, but Harvey convinced him otherwise, stating "I want this game in the worst way." He then allowed a leadoff walk to Lorenzo Cain before Eric Hosmer hit a double that scored a run and led to Collins putting in Familia. The game-tying run eventually scored later in the inning, resulting in a no-decision for Harvey in a game the Mets would eventually go on to lose in twelve innings that saw the Royals clinch the championship.

==== 2016 ====
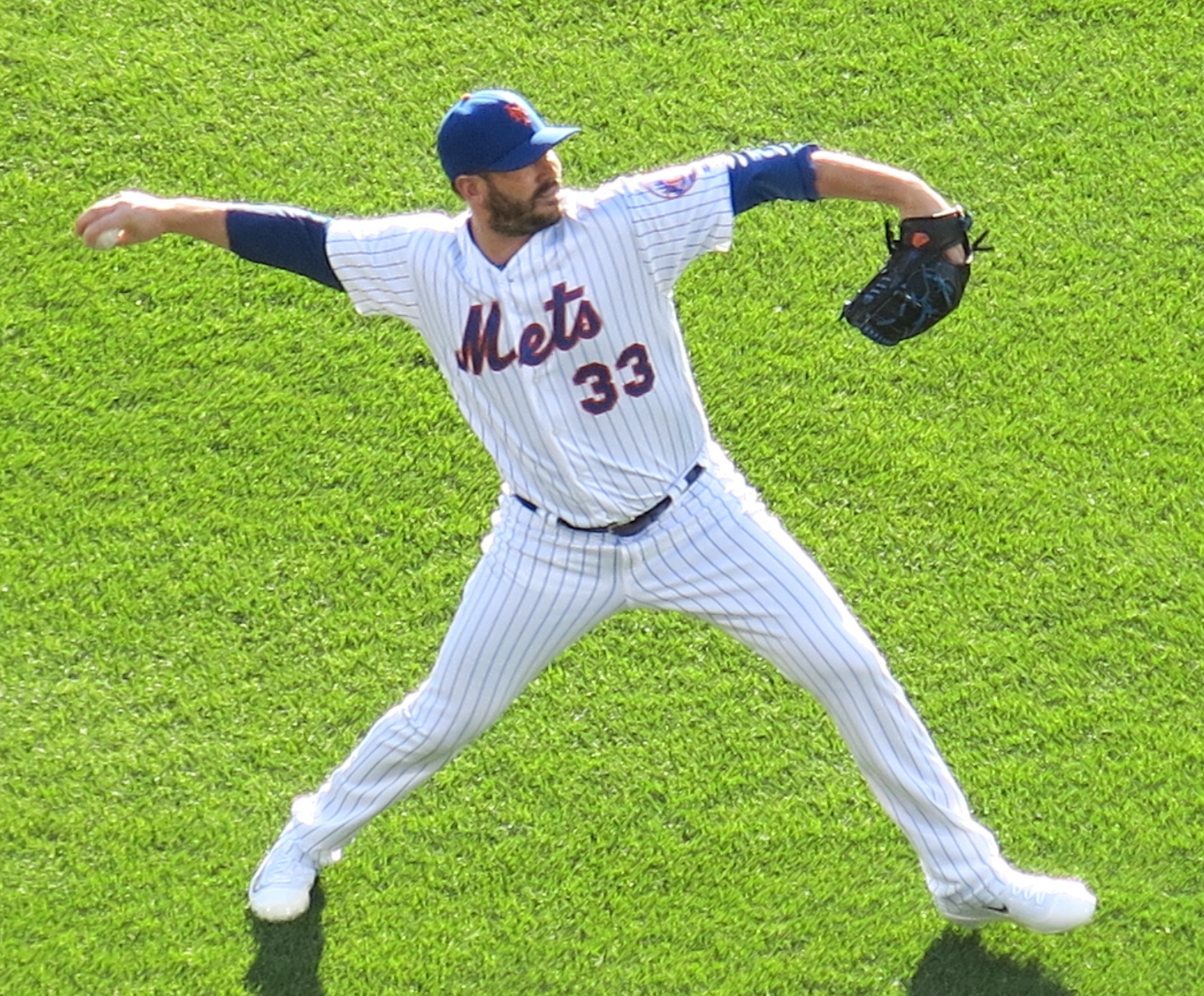
Harvey with the Mets in 2016

Harvey lost his first three starts of the 2016 season. During his first start on Opening Day against the reigning World Series champions, the Kansas City Royals, he allowed 4 runs (3 earned) and did not seem his typical self - striking out few batters and surrendering a large number of hits. After observing Harvey pitch, it seemed that his typical velocity and command had disappeared. Throughout the early part of the season, Harvey seemed to be struggling and inconsistent. Nevertheless, Harvey had a few quality starts, including one where he went 7 complete innings while striking out 7 against the Chicago White Sox and one against the San Diego Padres where he struck out a season-high 10 and surrendered only 2 runs through 6 innings. However, he was not pitching as successfully as he was his previous season. Mets pitching coach Dan Warthen said early in the season that Harvey had been struggling with a mechanical problem with his slider during his first three starts.

Throughout the 2016 season, it was believed Harvey was struggling mechanically. However, on July 8, in was announced that he opted to have season-ending surgery to resolve a condition called thoracic outlet syndrome. Harvey commented on his season-ending surgery, "I'm disappointed in the way I pitched, and hope this cures me, and we get back on track." Harvey ended the 2016 season with a 4–10 record and a 4.86 ERA in 17 starts.

==== 2017 ====
Coming back from surgery to correct his thoracic outlet syndrome, Harvey began the season 2–0 with a 2.84 ERA in his first four starts. His struggles from 2016 then began to carry over to 2017, as he pitched poorly in the months of May and June. On May 7, 2017, Harvey was suspended for three games for violating team rules. It was later revealed that Harvey did not show up to Citi Field the day before and was suspected to have been out late at night partying. Mets officials were sent over to Harvey's apartment to check on his welfare. On June 15, 2017, Harvey was placed on the 15-day disabled list with a stress fracture in his scapula that required surgery as he was ruled out for 6–8 weeks. Prior to the injury, he was 4–3 with a 5.25 ERA in 13 starts. Harvey was activated from the DL on September 2 to face the Houston Astros, giving up seven runs in two innings. He ended the season with a 5–7 record and 6.70 ERA.

==== 2018 ====
Harvey continued to struggle in 2018, sporting an 0–2 record and a 6.00 ERA after four starts. On April 21, Harvey was removed from the Mets rotation and placed in a bullpen role. In his first bullpen appearance of the season, Harvey allowed two hits and an earned run over two innings pitched. He was visibly frustrated after the game, refusing to talk to news media.

On May 4, 2018, the Mets announced that Harvey would be designated for assignment the next day after he refused a demotion to the minor leagues. In eight appearances on the season, Harvey was 0–2 and amassed a 7.00 ERA through four starts and four relief appearances, with 20 strikeouts in 27 innings.

=== Cincinnati Reds ===
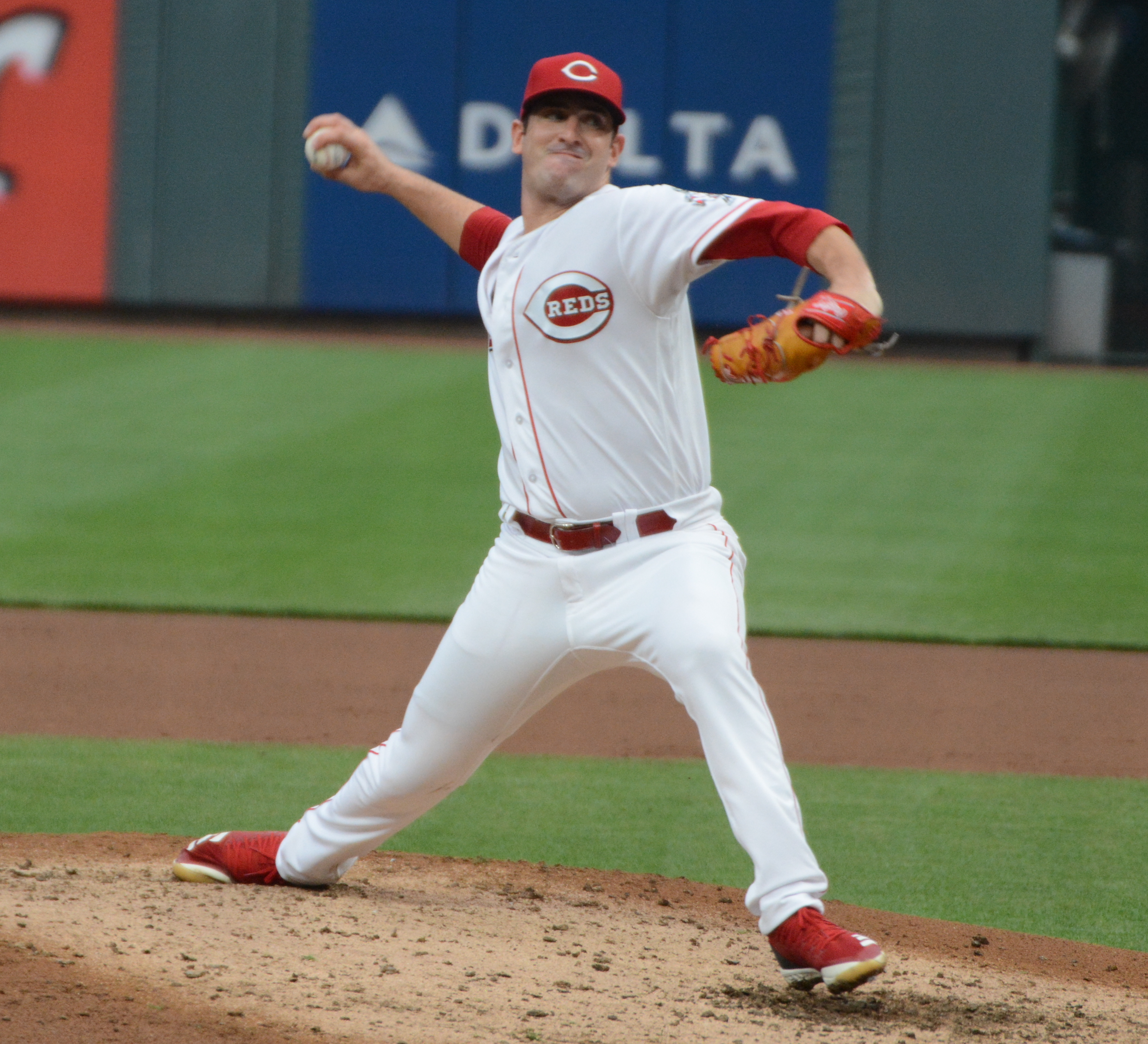
Harvey with the Reds in 2018

On May 8, 2018, the Mets traded Harvey to the Cincinnati Reds in exchange for catcher Devin Mesoraco and cash considerations. The Reds put Harvey into their starting rotation. On May 11, 2018, Harvey made his first start for the Reds, in which he pitched four scoreless innings against the Los Angeles Dodgers. For the Reds in 2018, he was 7–7 with a 4.50 ERA in 24 starts, and 111 strikeouts in 128 innings.

=== Los Angeles Angels ===
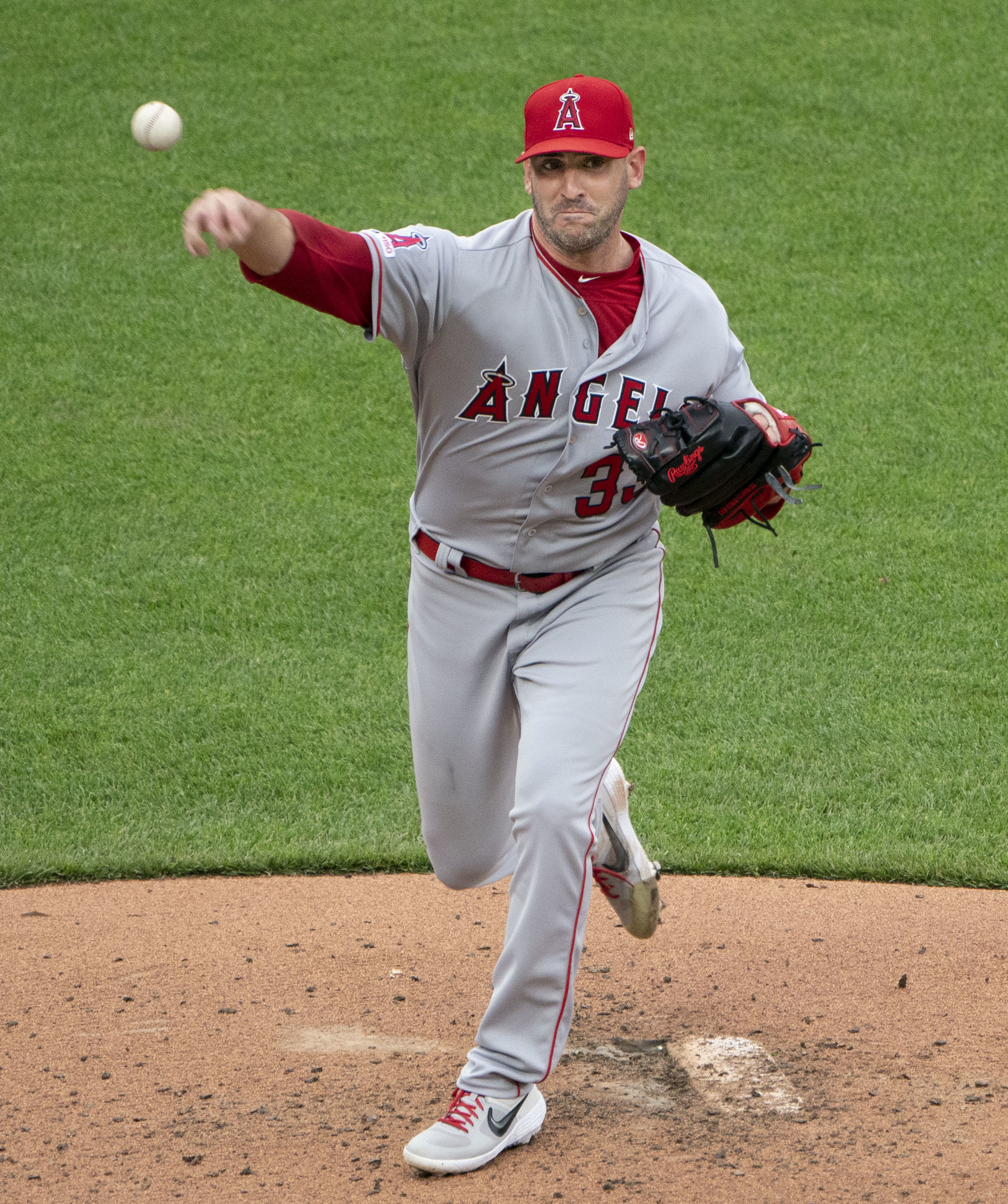
Harvey with the Angels in 2019

On December 21, 2018, Harvey signed a one-year, $11 million guaranteed contract with the Los Angeles Angels. The deal also includes the possibility of another $3 million in incentives. He posted an ERA of 7.50 in 48 innings before being placed on the disabled list with an upper back strain. He was activated on July 13. On July 19, Harvey was designated for assignment and was released on July 21. His final tally with the Angels was a 3–5 record with a 7.09 ERA.

=== Oakland Athletics ===
On August 14, 2019, Harvey signed a minor league contract with the Oakland Athletics. In 5 games (3 starts) for the Triple–A Las Vegas Aviators, he compiled a 3.18 ERA with 21 strikeouts across 17 innings pitched. Harvey elected free agency following the season on November 4.

=== Kansas City Royals ===
On July 28, 2020, Harvey signed a minor league contract with the Kansas City Royals. On August 19, he was promoted to the majors, and same day, he made his Royals debut. With the 2020 Kansas City Royals, Harvey appeared in 7 games, compiling a 0–3 record with 11.57 ERA and 10 strikeouts in 11.2 innings pitched.

=== Baltimore Orioles ===
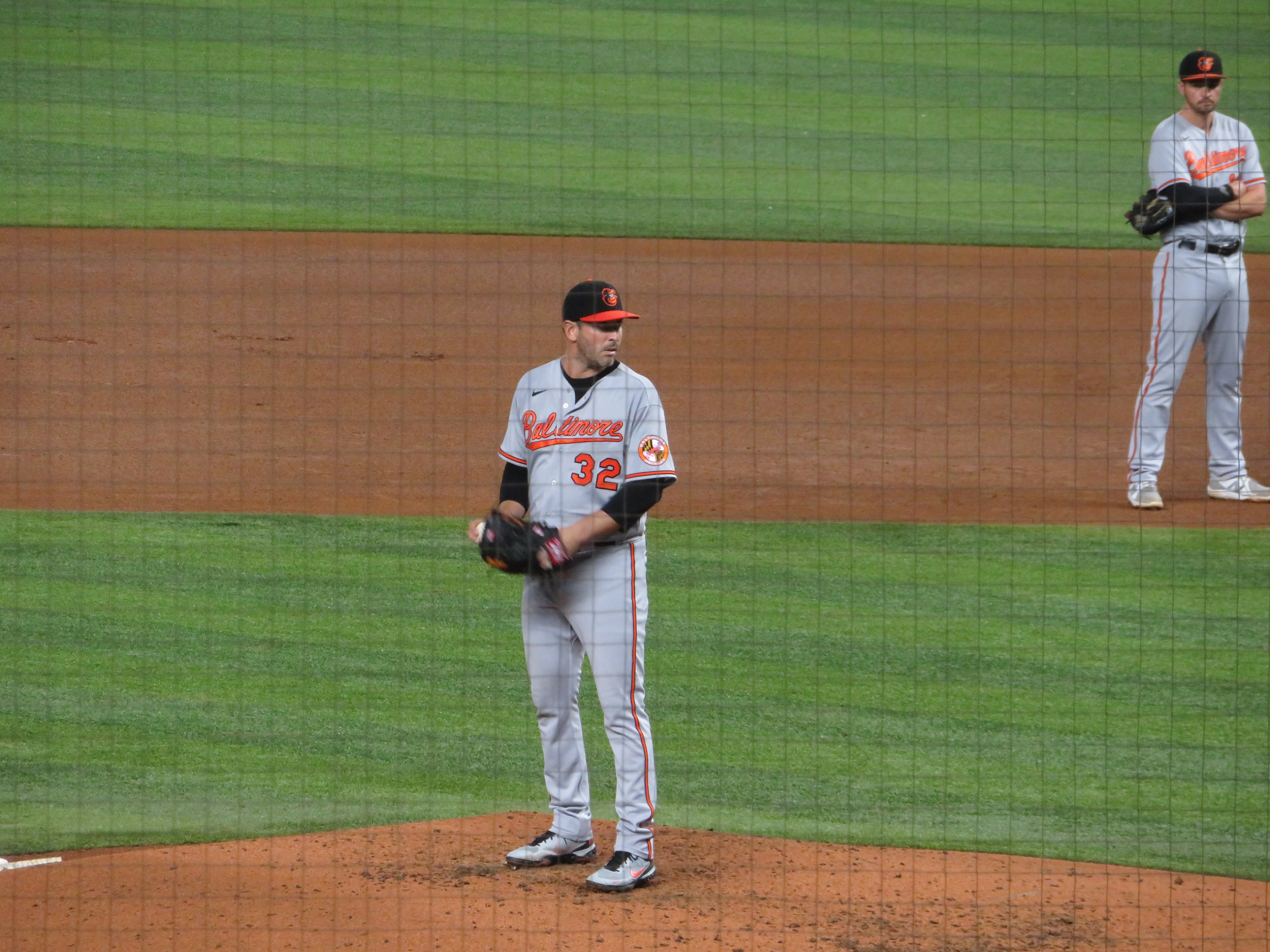
Harvey with the Orioles in 2021

On February 13, 2021, Harvey signed a minor league contract with the Baltimore Orioles. On March 25, the Orioles selected Harvey to the 40-man roster.

On May 12, Harvey started against the New York Mets for the first time at Citi Field. It was Harvey's first start at Citi Field since May 3, 2018. Harvey pitched 4 1/3 innings giving up 7 runs, 8 hits, 1 walk while striking out 4 in a 7-1 loss giving Harvey his third loss of the year. As Harvey was returning to the dugout after being pulled in the fifth inning, he was given a standing ovation by Mets fans. Harvey remarked about the ovation, "I was holding back tears, I’m not going to lie about that. It was pretty hard holding them back. It reminded me of really a lot of the good memories, and coming off the field with an ovation like that, it brought a lot back, and it was very special to me. It’s something I’ll never forget."

On June 9 at Camden Yards, Harvey started against the Mets for the second time. Harvey pitched three innings giving up 7 runs, 8 hits, 1 walk while striking out 2 in a 14-1 loss giving Harvey his seventh loss of the year. Harvey remarked after the game, "I play for the Orioles. I’m not here for Mets fans or anything like that. I appreciate the Orioles fans that were here. I have to be better in front of my home crowd, and I guess I just have to work harder."

On September 12, Harvey was placed on the 60-day injured list due to a right knee ailment, ending his 2021 season with a 6–14 record and 6.27 ERA with 95 strikeouts in 28 starts. The Orioles chose not to retain him after the season, making him a free agent.

On April 8, 2022, Harvey re-signed with the Orioles organization on a minor league contract. On May 17, he was issued a 60-game suspension for participating in distribution of a prohibited drug of abuse. The suspension was linked to his testimony related to the death of former teammate Tyler Skaggs. He made 13 starts split between the High-A Aberdeen IronBirds, Double-A Bowie Baysox, and Triple-A Norfolk Tides, registering an 8-1 record and 3.71 ERA with 63 strikeouts in 70 1/3 innings pitched. He elected free agency following the season on November 10.

On May 5, 2023, Harvey announced his retirement from professional baseball via Instagram.

== International career ==
Harvey pitched for the United States national under-18 team in 2006. He had a 4.70 ERA in two games.

Harvey played for the Italy at the 2023 World Baseball Classic. He was 1–0 in two starts with a 1.29 ERA, leading the team with 7 innings pitched. He announced his retirement as an active player two months later on May 5.

== Awards and honors ==
=== Minor leagues ===
- MiLB.com Organization All-Star (2011)
- All-Star Futures Game Selection (2011)
- Florida State League Mid-Season All-Star (2011)
- 2x FSL Pitcher of the Week (April 18 and May 31, 2011)
- International League Mid-Season All-Star (2012)

=== Major league ===
- National League Player of the Week (April 8–14, 2013)
- National League Pitcher of the Month (April 2013)
- All-Star selection (2013)
- National League Comeback Player of the Year (2015)

== Personal life ==
Harvey is a New York Rangers fan and frequently attends their games at Madison Square Garden.

During his time with the New York Mets, Harvey was known to live a flashy lifestyle, drive an expensive Maserati sports car, had been described as a "lothario" due to his record of dating fashion models, and was frequently mentioned in celebrity gossip columns in New York media. In May 2013, Matt Harvey began dating model Anne Vyalitsyna after meeting her at a New York Rangers game. They broke up in February 2014. In March 2017, Harvey was spotted kissing Brazilian supermodel Adriana Lima at the River Yacht Club in Miami, Florida. Harvey failed to show up at Citi Field for a Mets game and received a three-day suspension from the team. He also appeared nude in The Body Issue of ESPN The Magazine in 2013.

Harvey appeared on the cover of the May 20, 2013, issue of Sports Illustrated magazine, dubbed "The Dark Knight of Gotham", a play on Batman's home city, its association with New York City, and the recent Dark Knight film trilogy. Harvey, a Batman fan since childhood, along with teammates, fans, the Mets and other media sources, immediately embraced the comparison. Harvey had "Dark Knight" carved into the knobs of his bats to begin the 2015 season before replacing it with a personalized hybrid Harvey-Batman logo, versions of which had previously appeared on his locker and on T-shirts. Early in the 2013 season, fans, media and teammates also began referring to any day on which Harvey was scheduled to start as "Harvey Day". Harvey said that his best friend on the Mets was fellow starting pitcher Jacob deGrom.

=== Drug usage testimony ===
In the federal trial regarding the death of Tyler Skaggs, his teammate on the Angels, Harvey testified on February 15, 2022, that he had provided Skaggs with Percocet pills. Harvey admitted that he regularly used cocaine while playing in New York and Los Angeles and that he took Percocet while in the dugout and clubhouse during his Angels tenure. Harvey said he received the pills from Eric Kay, the Angels' director of communications. Kay faces drug distribution and drug conspiracy charges. In May 2022, MLB suspended Harvey for 60 games for distributing oxycodone.
