= Dark Is the Night =

Dark Is the Night may refer to:

- Dark Is the Night (1945 film), Soviet film
- Dark Is the Night (2017 film)
- "Dark Is the Night" (Soviet song), a song originally performed by Mark Bernes in the 1943 war film Two Soldiers
- "Dark Is the Night for All", a 1993 song by A-ha
