= Green Room Blues =

Studio album by The Deluxtone Rockets
- Released: March 27, 2001
- Genre: Rockabilly; rock and roll; country
- Label: Tooth & Nail Records
- Producer: Gene Eugene; Chris Colbert

The Deluxtone Rockets chronology
The Deluxtone Rockets (1999)	Green Room Blues (2001)

Professional ratings
Review scores
Source	Rating
Christianity Today	(not rated)
Cross Rhythms	(not rated) link
freakmusic.com	(not rated)
CCM Magazine	(not rated)
HM Magazine	(not rated)

Green Room Blues is the second and final album from Michigan band The Deluxtone Rockets. Musically the album changes the bands' direction from swing to rockabilly and winds up sounding, according to CCM magazine, something like "Johnny Cash head butting with Buddy Holly" HM went further, stating that the transformation was "like comparing Britney Spears to Pedro the Lion."

The album has a sordid production history, as two of the producers died during production, Dennis Danell and Gene Eugene. The effort was eventually completed by Chris Colbert. The album is named after Gene Eugene's recording studio, The Green Room, in Huntington Beach, California. "Love Song" is a cover of the song by The Cure.

== Track listing ==
1. "Broken Heart"
2. "Love Song"
3. "Darkest Night"
4. "2,000 Miles"
5. "Downslide"
6. "Costa Mesa"
7. "Redemption"
8. "Doing Time"
9. "Open Road"
10. "Wolftown Blues"
11. "Judgement Day"
