= Black Knight (disambiguation) =

The Black Knight is a literary stock character.

Black Knight or Knights may also refer to:

== Film ==
- Black Knight (film), a 2001 film starring Martin Lawrence
- Black Knight (Monty Python), character in the movie Monty Python and the Holy Grail

== Games ==
- Black knight, a knight in chess
- MechWarrior 4: Black Knight, an expansion pack of the video game MechWarrior 4: Vengeance
- Black Knight (pinball), 1980 Williams pinball machine
- Black Knight 2000, 1989 Williams pinball machine, sequel to Black Knight

== Music ==
- Black Knights (rap group), affiliated with The Wu-Tang Clan
- The Black Knights (band), a Mersey Beat band

== Military ==
- 57th Fighter-Interceptor Squadron, a USAF fighter squadron known as "The Black Knights of Keflavik"
- VFA-154, a US Navy fighter squadron nicknamed "The Black Knights"
- VMFA-314, a US Marine Corps fighter squadron nicknamed "The Black Knights"
- VMM-264, a US Marine Corps tiltrotor squadron nicknamed "The Black Knights"
- RSAF Black Knights, a precision aerobatics team of the Republic of Singapore Air Force
- "The Black Knights", the display team of No. 54 Squadron RAF in the 1950s
- 5th Cavalry Regiment, a United States Army unit referred to as "The Black Knights"

== Nickname ==
- Zawisza the Black (1379–1428), Polish knight and diplomat
- James Stewart, the Black Knight of Lorn (c. 1383–after 1451), Scottish nobleman
- Ralph de Ashton (fl. 1421–1486), an officer of state under Edward IV of England
- Hans von Trotha (c. 1450–1503), German knight and marshal excommunicated by Pope Innocent VIII; after his death, local folklore as a nefarious "Black Knight" and restless spirit
- Turner Ashby (1828-1862), an Confederate officer serving Virginian cavalry
- Eduard Ritter von Schleich (1888–1947), Bavarian World War I flying ace and World War II Luftwaffe general
- Gary Player (born 1935), South African golfer
- Victor Newman, a character in the CBS soap opera The Young and the Restless, called the Black Knight

== Sports ==
- Black Knight (horse) (1979–2002), Australian Thoroughbred racehorse
- Army Black Knights, the nickname of the sporting teams of the United States Military Academy
- The mascot and sports teams of Baltimore City College, Baltimore, Maryland, United States
- The mascot and sports teams of Charlottesville High School, Charlottesville, Virginia, US
- Las Vegas Black Knights, a rejected name for the Vegas Golden Knights

== Science and technology ==
- Black Knight (rocket), part of the British rocketry program in the 1950s
- Black Knight (vehicle), an unmanned ground vehicle designed by BAE Systems
- TrES-2b, an exoplanet colloquially known as "Black Knight" due to its darkness
- Camacinia othello, a species of dragonfly

== Other uses ==
- Black Knight, a magazine for Aboriginal Australians produced in Brisbane by Bill Rosser in 1975
- Black Knight, Inc., an American technology company
- Knight of Glin or Black Knight, an Irish hereditary knighthood
- Vincent Black Knight, a British motorcycle made between 1954 and 1955 by Vincent Motorcycles
- The Black Knights, a fictional resistance movement in the anime series Code Geass

== See also ==
- Black Knight satellite conspiracy theory, a conspiracy theory about an alien satellite
