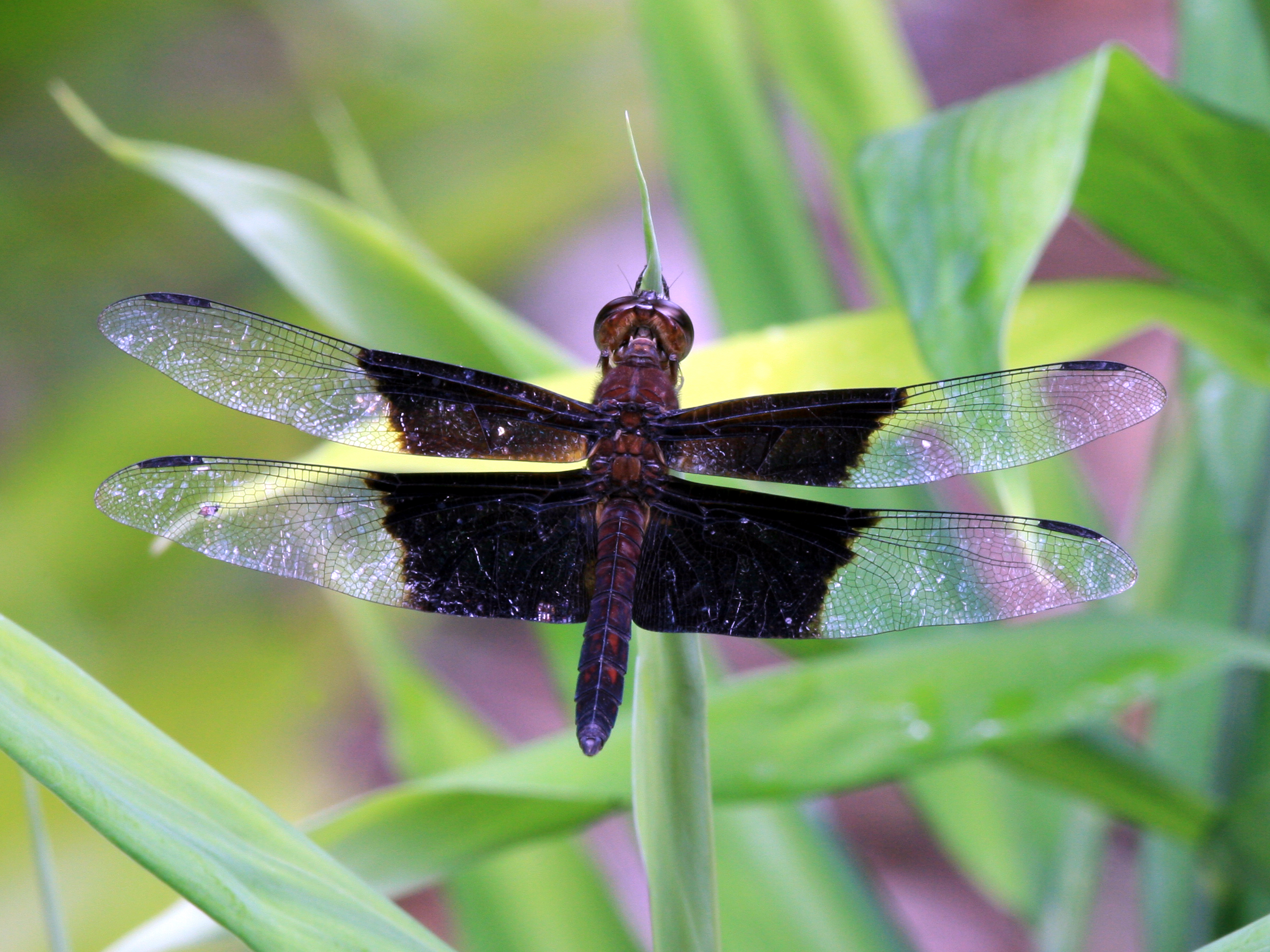
- Male in Cairns, Australia
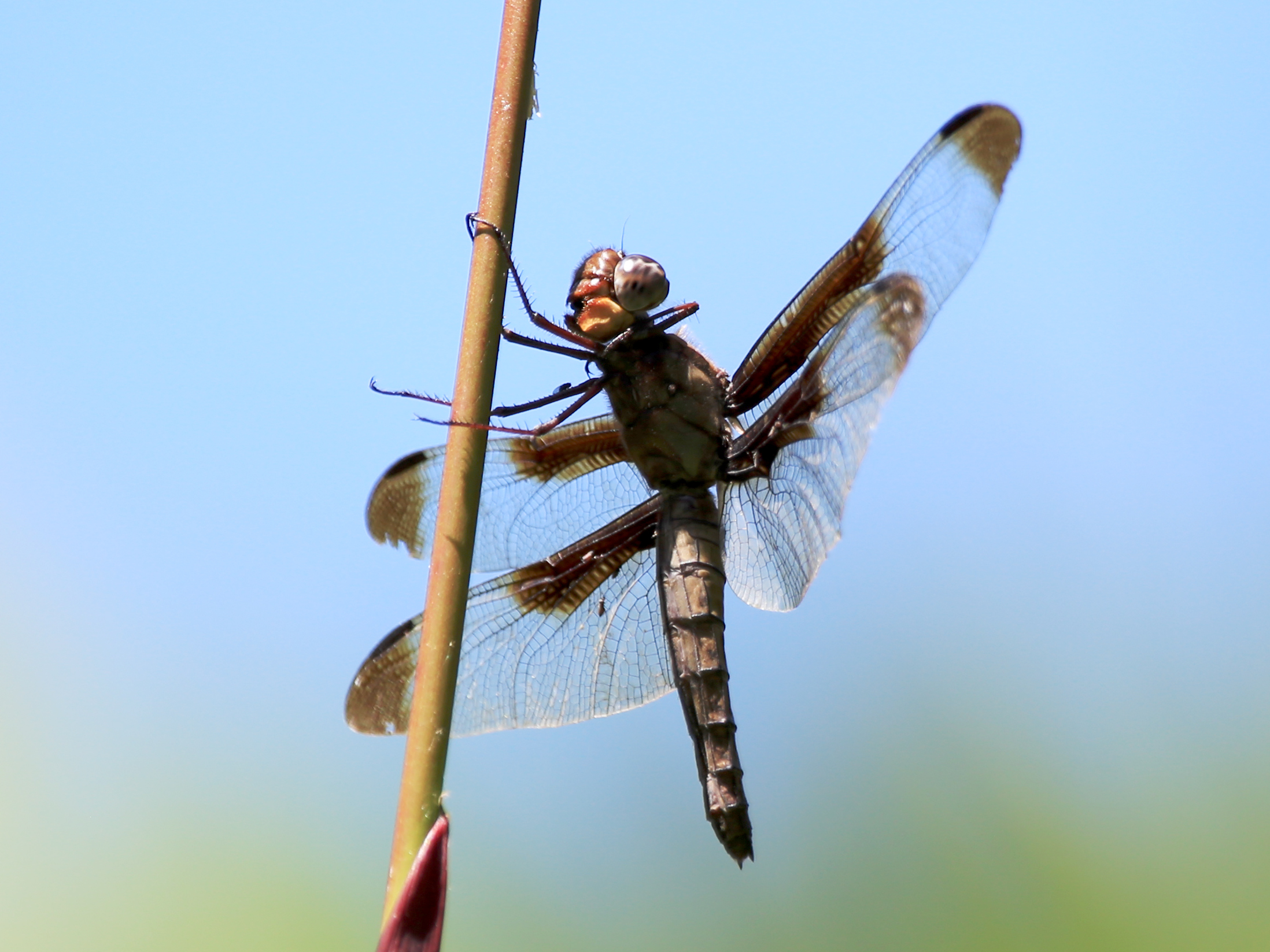
- Female in Cairns, Australia

Conservation status
- Least Concern (IUCN 3.1)

Scientific classification
- Kingdom: Animalia
- Phylum: Arthropoda
- Clade: Pancrustacea
- Class: Insecta
- Order: Odonata
- Infraorder: Anisoptera
- Family: Libellulidae
- Genus: Camacinia
- Species: C. othello

Binomial name
- Camacinia othello Tillyard, 1908

= Camacinia othello =

Species of dragonfly

Camacinia othello is a species of dragonfly in the family Libellulidae known commonly as the black knight. It is native to Indonesia, Papua New Guinea, the Solomon Islands, and the Northern Territory and Queensland in Australia.

It is a large dragonfly with a wingspan of 115 millimeters and an overall length of around 65 millimeters The adult male has dark markings on the forewing and hindwing covering around one third to one half of each wing. The markings on the female differ substantially, with a light brown stripe along the leading edge of each wing to just beyond the node, and light brown marks on each wingtip.

Little is known about its habitat preferences and other characteristics. There are twenty-seven records listed in the Atlas of Living Australia as of January, 2017. It is not considered to be threatened.

== Etymology ==
The genus name Camacinia is possibly derived from the Greek καμάκινος (kamakinos, "made of reed", "cane", or similar), referring to the shape of the abdomen.

The species name othello is likely named for the Shakespearean character Othello, referring to the distinctive dark wing markings.

== Gallery ==
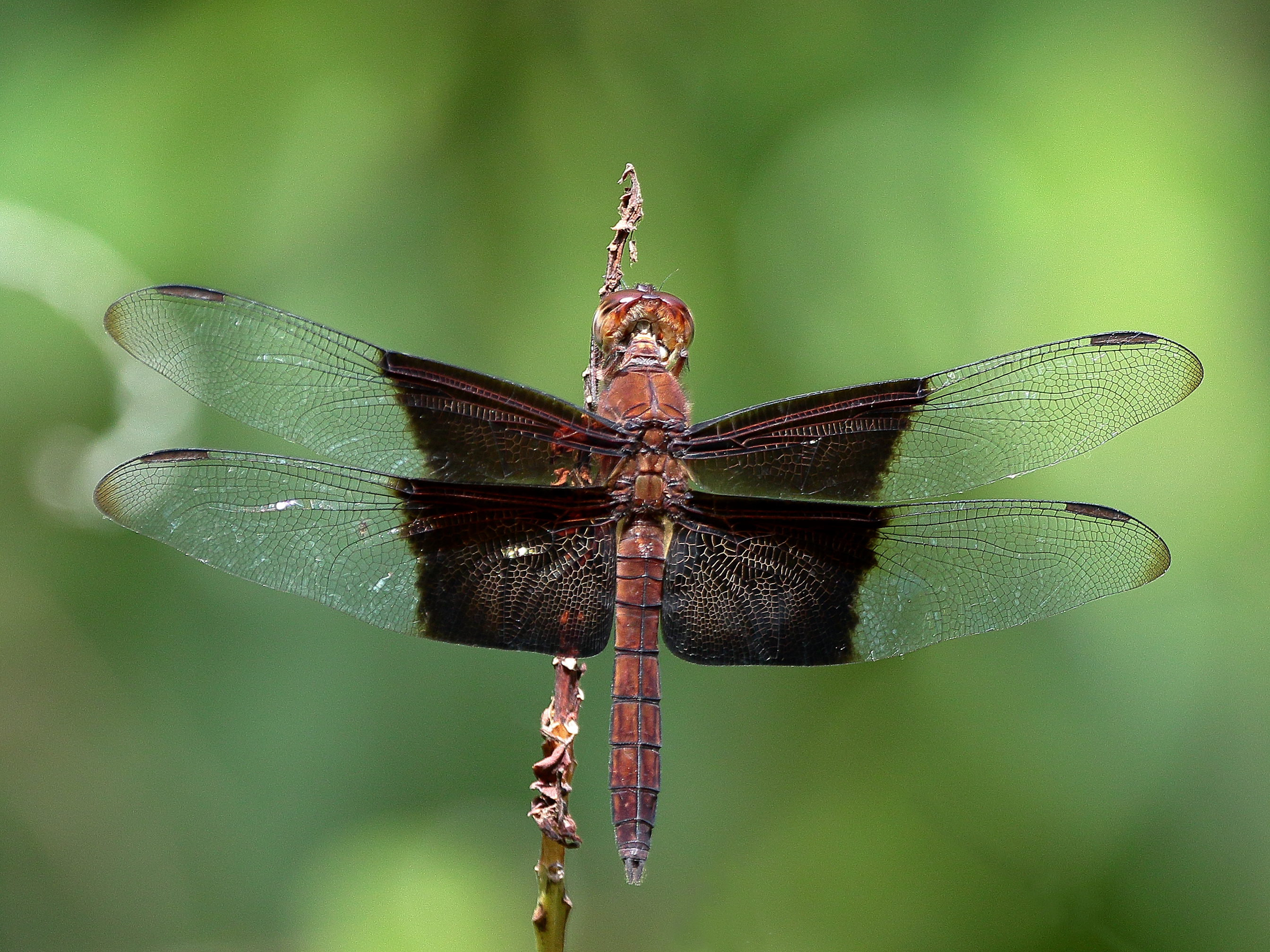
Male, dorsal view, Cairns

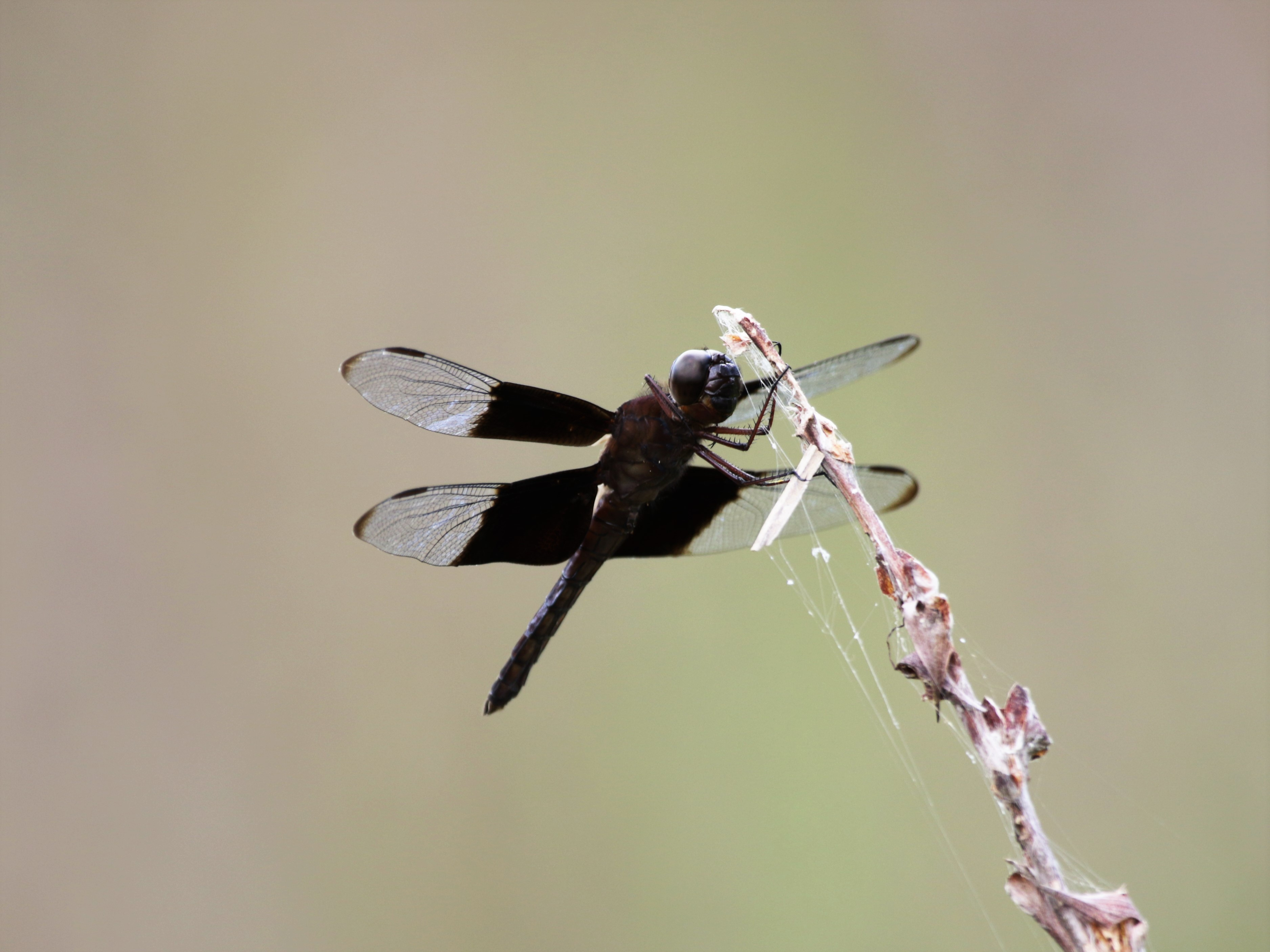
Male underside

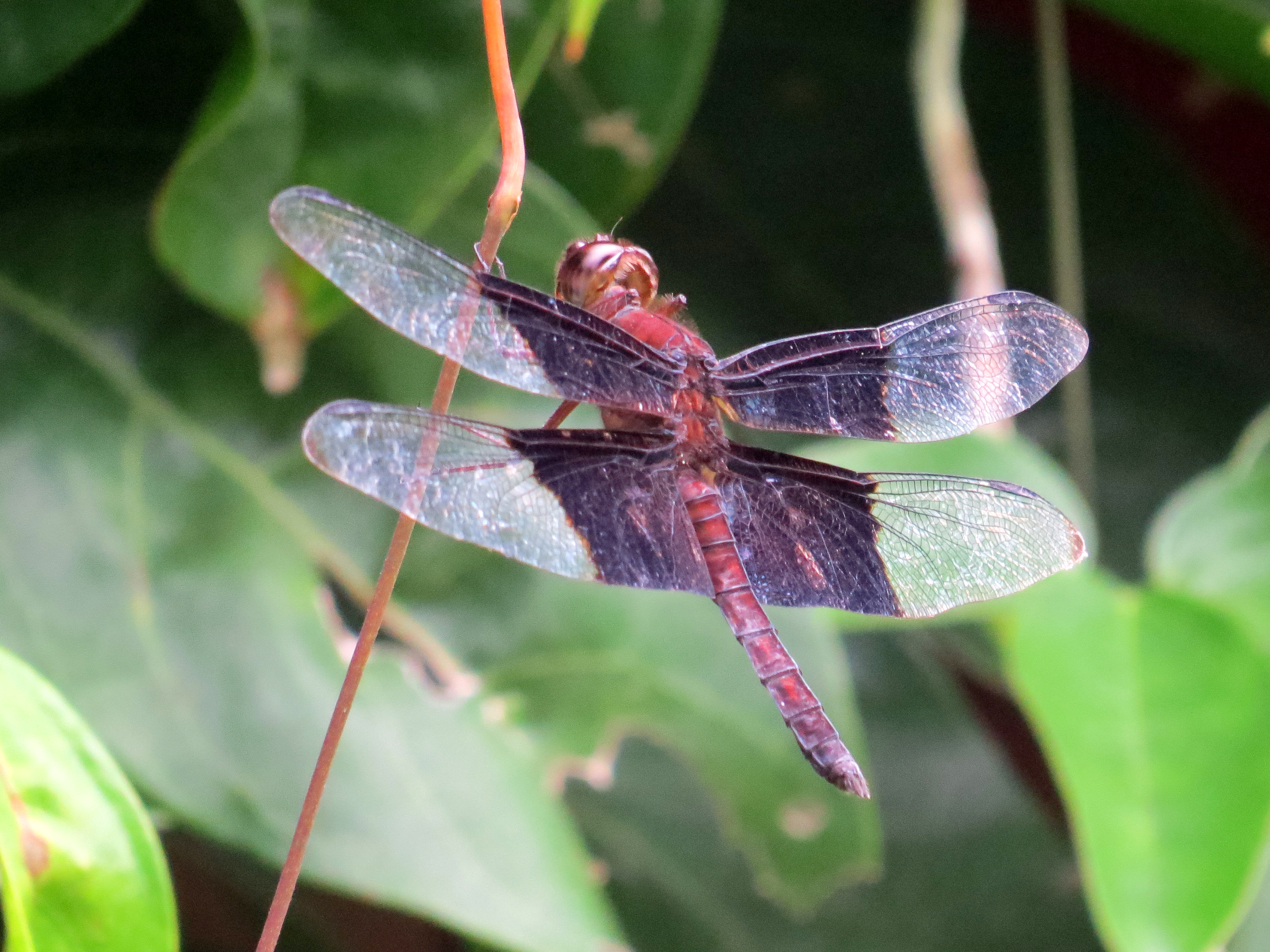
Male showing brownish body

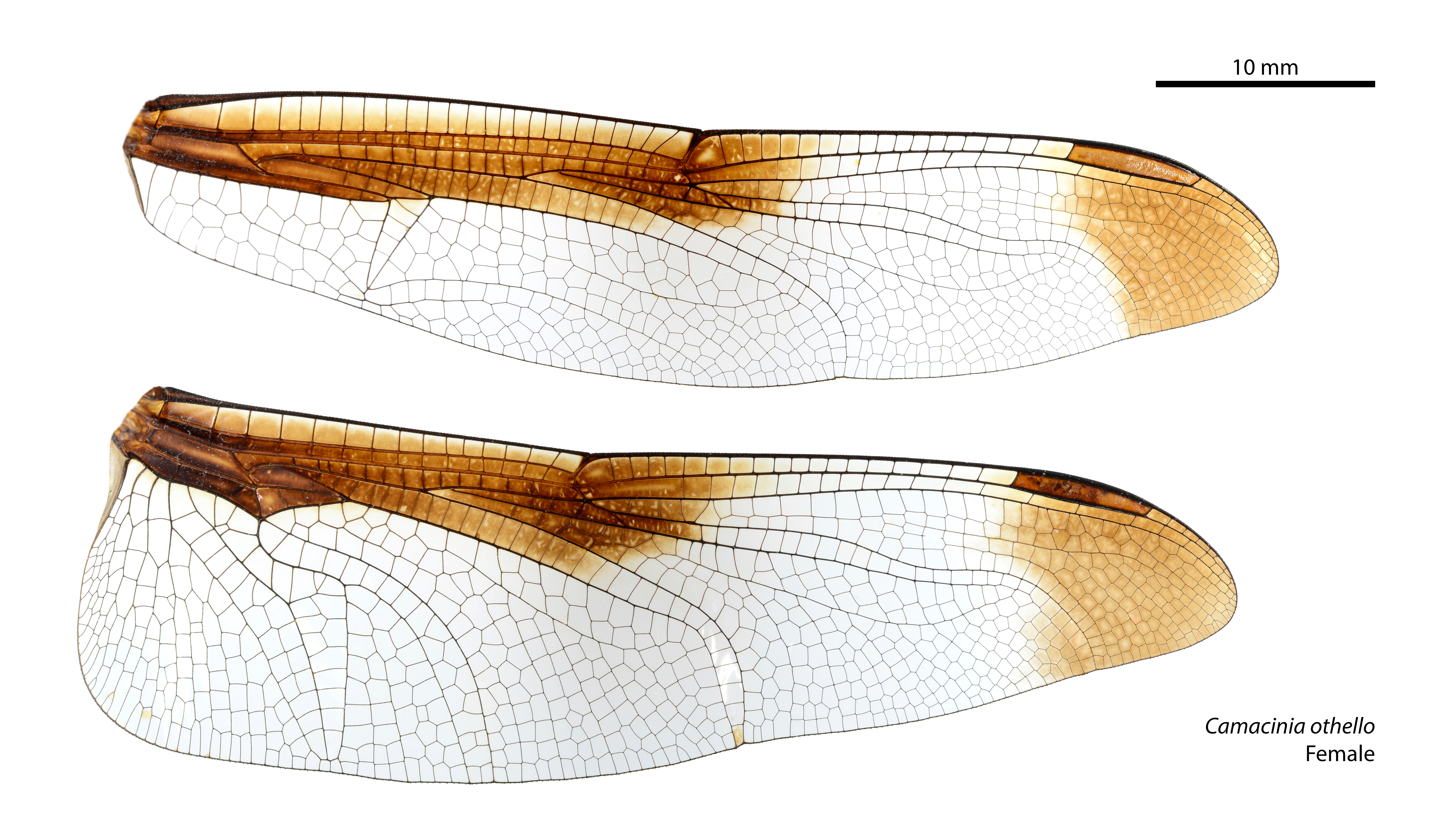
Female wings

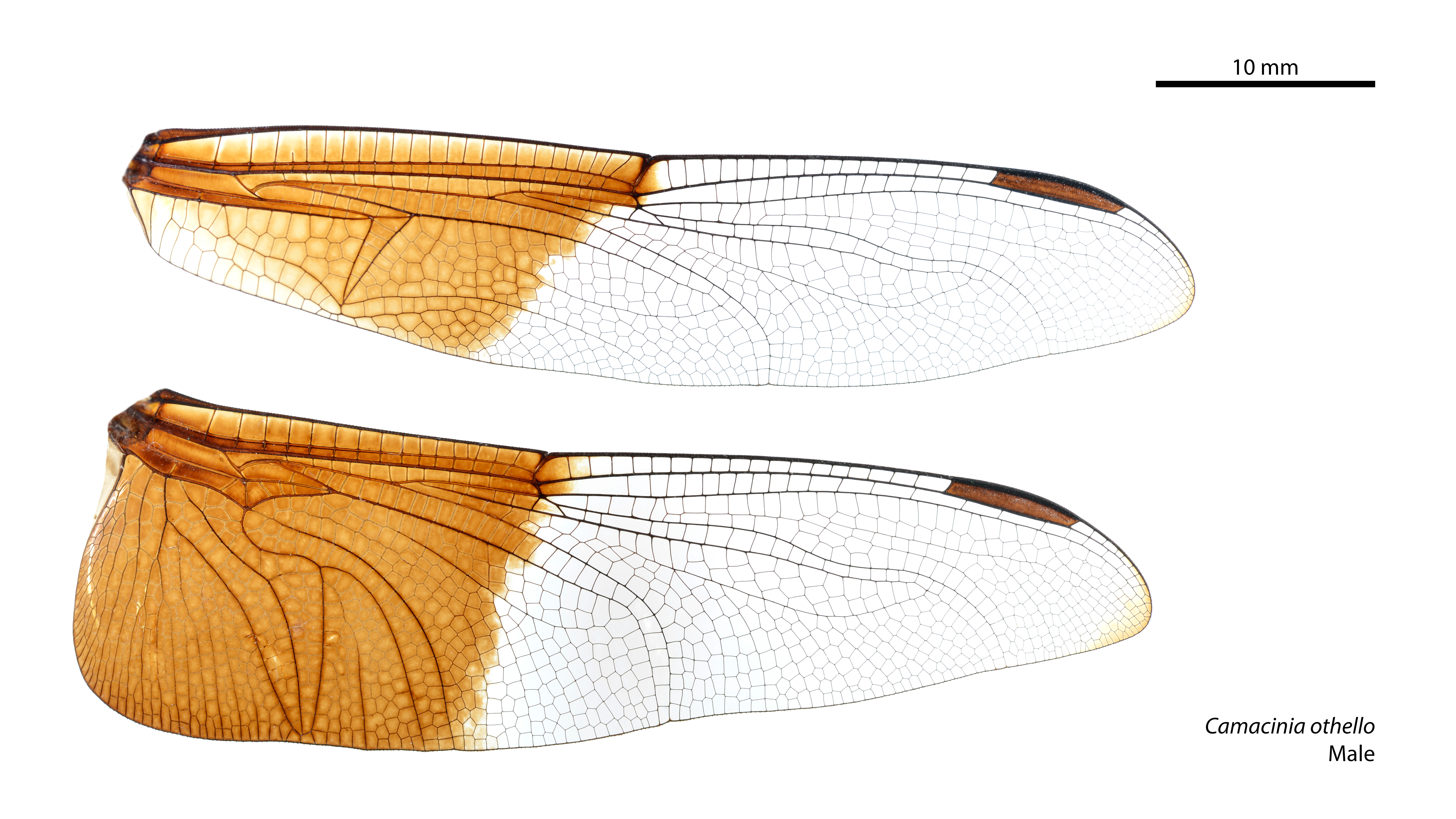
Male wings
