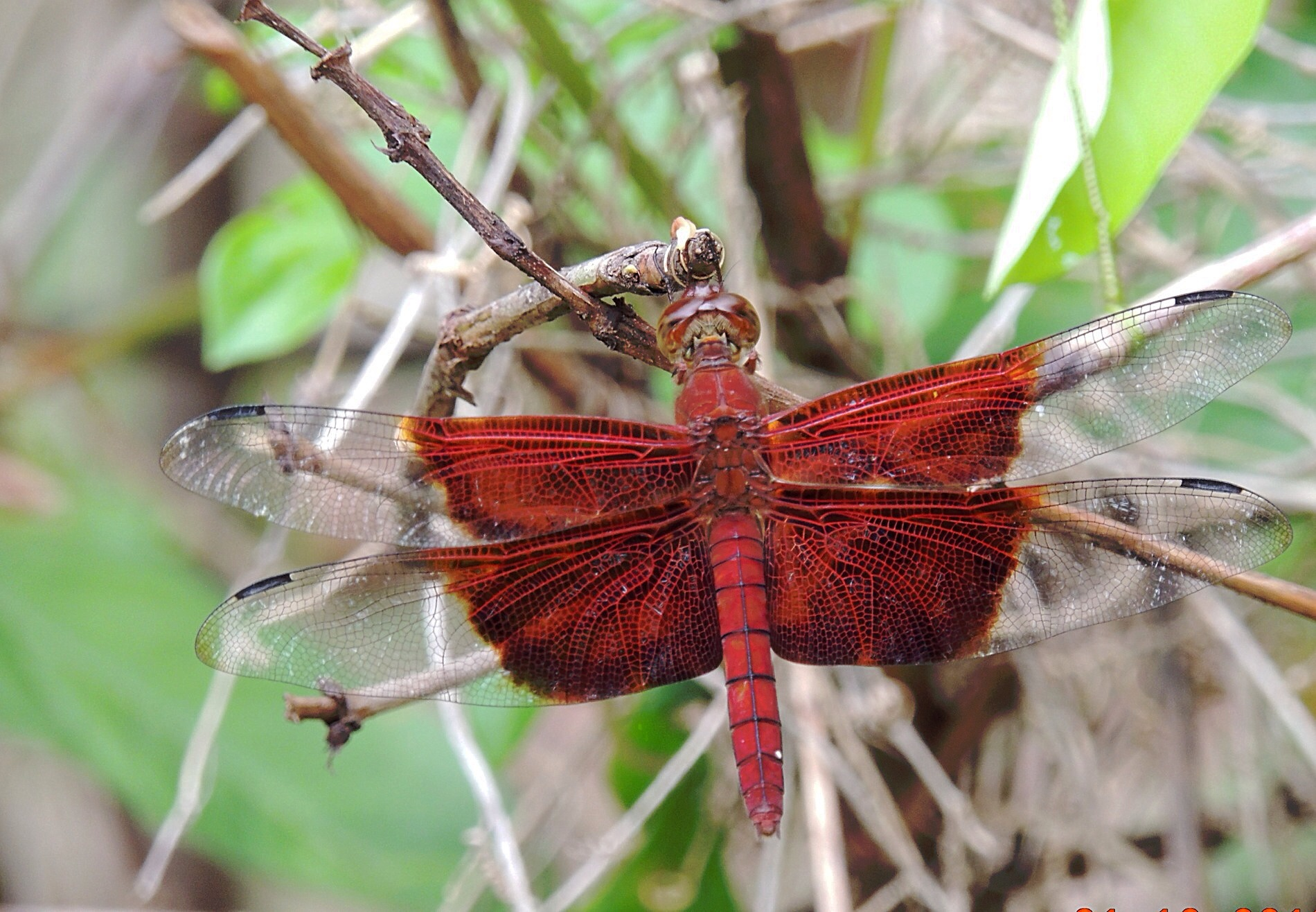
- Camacinia gigantea

Scientific classification
- Kingdom: Animalia
- Phylum: Arthropoda
- Clade: Pancrustacea
- Class: Insecta
- Order: Odonata
- Infraorder: Anisoptera
- Family: Libellulidae
- Subfamily: Trameinae
- Tribe: Trameini
- Genus: Camacinia; Kirby, 1889

= Camacinia =

Genus of dragonflies

Camacinia is a small genus of dragonflies in the family Libellulidae. Species of Camacinia are found from South-east Asia to the Solomon Islands, Australia and New Guinea. There are three species.

== Etymology ==
The genus name Camacinia is possibly derived from the Greek καμάκινος (kamakinos, "made of reed", "cane", or similar), referring to the shape of the abdomen.

== Species ==
Species of Camacinia include:

Male	Female	Scientific name	Common name	Distribution
		Camacinia gigantea Brauer, 1867	Giant Forest Skimmer	India, Bangladesh, Bhutan
		Camacinia harterti Karsch, 1890		Sikkim, India and northern Vietnam
		Camacinia othello Tillyard, 1908	black knight	Indonesia, Papua New Guinea, the Solomon Islands, and the Northern Territory and Queensland in Australia.
