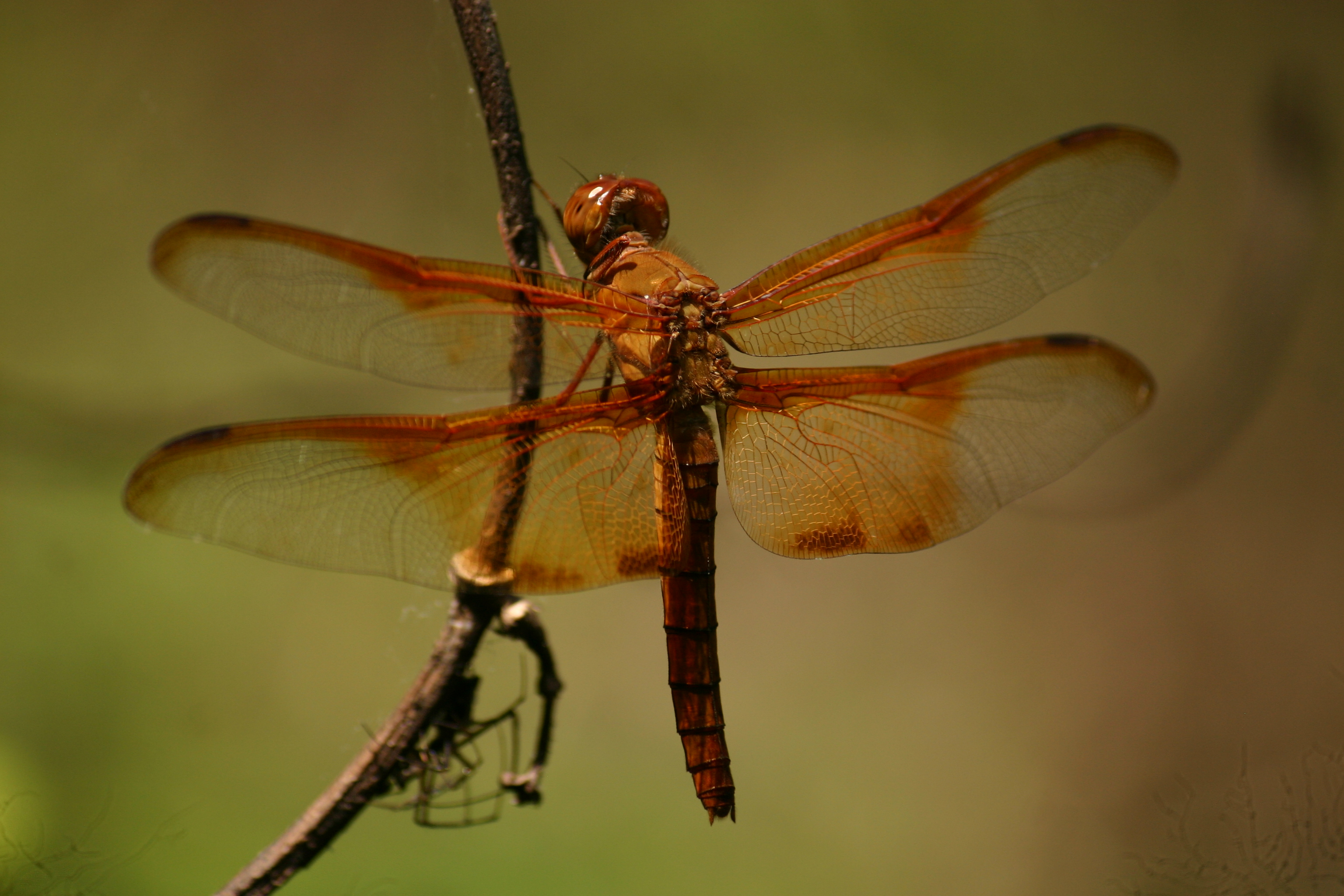
- Female
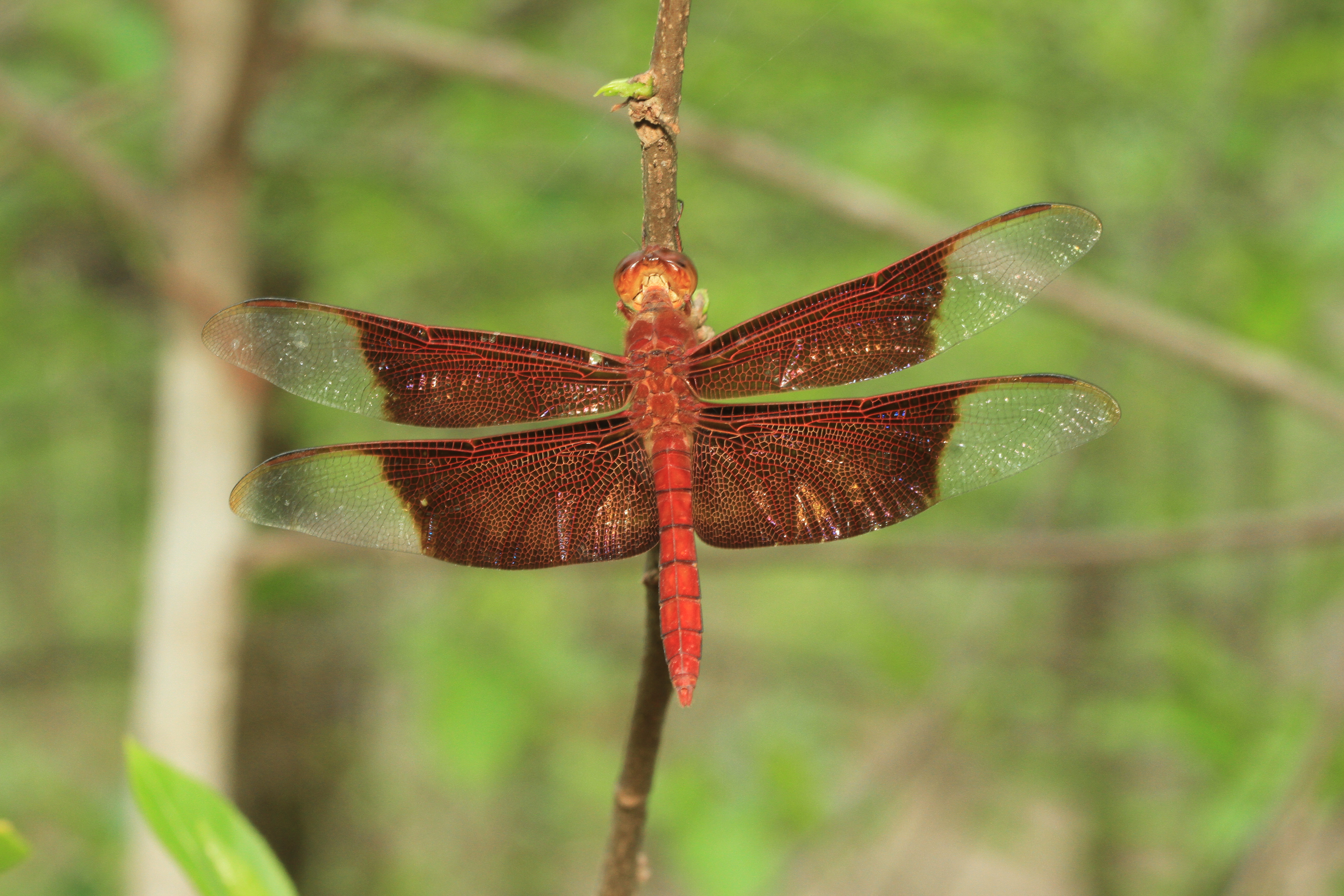
- Male

Scientific classification
- Kingdom: Animalia
- Phylum: Arthropoda
- Class: Insecta
- Order: Odonata
- Infraorder: Anisoptera
- Family: Libellulidae
- Genus: Camacinia
- Species: C. gigantea

Binomial name
- Camacinia gigantea (Brauer, 1867)

Synonyms
- Neurothemis gigantea Brauer, 1867

= Camacinia gigantea =

Sultan

Species of dragonfly

Camacinia gigantea, the sultan, is a species of libellulid dragonfly.

The sultan is found in forests of mainland and maritime Southeast Asia. It has been recorded from Indonesia, Malaysia, Singapore, Thailand, Cambodia, Myanmar, Vietnam, Bangladesh and the Philippines. In India, it is known from the eastern states of West Bengal, Assam and Nagaland, the central states of Orissa and Madhya Pradesh, and from the Andaman and Nicobar Islands territory.
